= Feilong (disambiguation) =

The Feilong (simplified Chinese: 飞龙; traditional Chinese: 飛龍; pinyin: fēilóng; Wade–Giles: fei lung; lit. 'flying dragon') is a legendary flying creature in Chinese mythology.

Feilong may also refer to:

- Fei Lung, a British-built gunboat in the Guangdong Fleet
- Feilong (FL) missiles, a family of Chinese anti-ship missiles, such as FL-7
- Feilong (loitering munition), a family of Chinese loitering munitions
- Fei-Long, a video game character in the Street Fighter series
