= Feilong =

Chinese legendary creature

Feilong (simplified Chinese: 飞龙; traditional Chinese: 飛龍; pinyin: fēilóng; Wade–Giles: fei lung; lit. 'flying dragon') is a legendary creature that flies among clouds in Chinese mythology. Feilong is a proper name, and is often used as a title for other ideas and objects.

== Word ==
The Chinese dragon name feilong combines fei (飞; 飛; 'fly', 'flying', 'hover', 'flutter') and long (龙; 龍; 'dragon'). This loanword 飛龍 became the Japanese: 飛竜; rōmaji: hiryū; Korean: 비룡; romaja: biryong; Vietnamese: philong. The inverted Longfei (龍飛) was an era name (396–399 CE) during the Later Liang Dynasty.

The (121 CE) Shuowen Jiezi, the first Chinese character dictionary, uses feilong to define da (龖) (written with 2 龍 dragons) "flying dragon; appearance of a dragon in flight".

== Early references ==
Chinese classic texts frequently mention feilong 飛龍 "flying dragons". The examples below are roughly arranged in chronological order, although some heterogeneous texts are of uncertain dates.

=== Yijing ===
The (5th–3rd centuries BCE) Yijing "Book of Changes" first uses feilong to symbolize a daren (大人) "great person; accomplished person". Qian (乾) "The Creative", the first hexagram, says, "Nine in the fifth place means: Flying dragons in the heavens. It furthers one to see the great man." The "Commentary on the Decision" (彖傳), explains, "Because the holy man is clear as to the end and the beginning, as to the way in which each of the six stages completes itself in its own time, he mounts on them toward heaven as though on six dragons." And the "Commentary on the Images" (象傳), says, "'Flying dragon in the heavens.' This shows the great man at work."

Many later texts, such as the Zuozhuan, Shiji, and Hanshu histories, quote this "Flying dragons in the heavens" from the Yijing.

=== Hanfeizi ===
The (3rd century BCE) Hanfeizi (難勢) quotes Shen Dao contrasting feilong (飛龍) with tengshe (螣蛇) "ascending/floating snake" to explain the Legalist concept of shi 勢 "political power; strategic advantage".

Shen Tzu said: "The flying dragon mounts the clouds and the t'eng snake wanders in the mists. But when the clouds dissipate and the mists clear, the dragon and the snake become the same as the earthworm and the large-winged black ant because they have lost that on which they ride. Where men of superior character are subjugated by inferior men, it is because their authority is lacking and their position is low. Where the inferior are subjugated by the superior, it is because the authority of the latter is considerable and their position is high.

Ames notes this Shen Dao quotation "is very close both in wording and in substance to" the Shenzi (威德) fragment, and "indeed, it could conceivably be an expansion and elaboration on it."

=== Lüshi Chunqiu ===
The (c. 3rd century BCE) encyclopedic Lüshi Chunqiu (古樂) "Music of the Ancients",) uses Feilong (飛龍) "Flying Dragon" as the name of a music master for the legendary ruler Zhuanxu

The Sovereign Zhuanxu was born at Ruo River and lived at Kongsang. Then he ascended to become a Sovereign who was truly a match for Heaven. When the winds true to the eight directions circulated, they made sounds like hya-hya, tsied-tsied, and tsyang-tsyang. The Sovereign Zhuanxu, being fond of these sounds, ordered Feilong to compose music in imitation of the Eight Winds, naming them "Supporting the Clouds" and using them in the worship of the Supreme Sovereign. He then ordered the [鼉] water-lizard to lead them as singing master, so the water-lizard reclined and, using his tail to beat his belly, made the sound bung-bung.

=== Zhuangzi ===
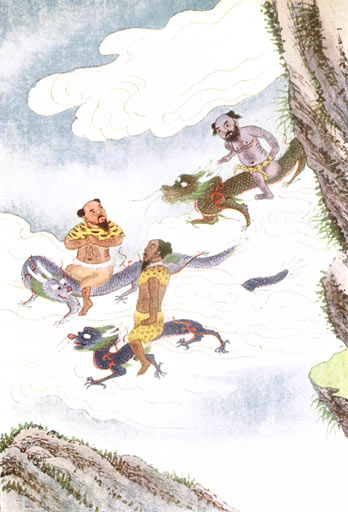
Xian riding dragons

The (3rd–2nd centuries BC) Daoist Zhuangzi (1) describes a shenren (神人) "holy person" riding a feilong

He said that there is a Holy Man living on faraway Ku-she Mountain, with skin like ice or snow, and gentle and shy like a young girl. He doesn't eat the five grains, but sucks the wind, drinks the dew, climbs up on the clouds and mist, rides a flying dragon, and wanders beyond the Four Seas. By concentrating his spirit, he can protect creatures from sickness and plague and make the harvest plentiful.

=== Chuci ===
The (3rd–2nd centuries BCE) Chuci uses feilong in two poems. The Li Sao 離騷 "On Encountering Trouble" says,

Harness winged dragons to be my coursers; Let my chariot be of fine work of jade and ivory! How can I live with men whose hearts are strangers to me? I am going a far journey to be away from them.

The "Goddess of the Xiang" 湘君 mentions feilong twice.

North I go, drawn by my flying dragon, Steering my course to the Dong-ting lake: My sail is of fig-leaves, melilotus my rigging, An iris my flag-pole, my banner of orchids. Gazing at the distant Cen-yang mooring, I waft my magic across the Great River. ... The stream runs fast through the stony shallow, And my flying dragon wings swiftly above it. The pain is more lasting if loving is faithless: She broke her tryst; she told me she had not time.

=== Huainanzi ===
The (2nd century BCE) Huainanzi uses feilong in two chapters.

"Evolution of Animals and Plants" (墬形訓,) mentions feilong with yujia (羽嘉) "winged excellence", fenghuang (鳳皇) "phoenix", and luan (鸞) "a legendary phoenix-like bird; simurgh".

Winged Excellence gave birth to Flying Dragon. Flying Dragon gave birth to the phoenix (fenghuang). The phoenix gave birth to the simurgh (luan). The simurgh gave birth to ordinary birds. Feathered creatures in general are born from ordinary birds.

Edward H. Schafer first translated luan as simurgh "a giant winged creature in Persian mythology".

"Generalship and the Prevention of Anarchy" (兵略訓,) describes Daoist movement with the animal metaphors of luan, qilin (instead of yujia), fenghuang, and feilong.

The movements of the Tao-inspired are like a spirit's emergence and a demon's action, unexpected and sudden, like the sudden shining of the stars and their sinking into darkness again; like the rising of the fabulous bird Luan, and the excitation of the Lin, like the flight of the phoenix or the ascension of the dragon.

=== Baopuzi ===
The (c. 320 CE) Daoist Baopuzi by Ge Hong mentions Feilong (飛龍) "flying dragon" and uses it as a graphic variant for the draconic mountain spirit Feifei (飛飛) "fly fly".

Feilong occurs describing a Daoist xian (仙) "transcendent; immortal" (6), "When my eyes have square pupils and my ears grow from the top of my head; when, driving a flying dragon and riding a cloud of good fortune, I shall mount above the darted lightning and reach Lighted-from-below, how will you be able to interrogate me? If you see me, you will then cry out that it is a heaven or an earth deity, or a strange sort of man. It will never occur to you to say that I am something produced by mere study!"

Feifei occurs with kui (夔) "a one-legged demon" in a list of shanxiao (山魈) "mountain spirits", "Another is like a dragon, variegated in color and with red horns, the name being Fei-fei. Whenever one of these appears, shout its name, and it will not dare harm you."

=== Other texts ===
Feilong occurs in many additional contexts. Carr cites two examples. The Xijingfu (西京賦) "Western Metropolis Rhapsody", by Zhang Heng (78–139 CE), used feilong as an alternate name for the mythical bird called longque (龍雀) "dragon sparrow". Bicheng (筆乘) "Collection of Notes", by Jiao Hong (焦竑) (1540–1620 CE), described the feilong as having "a dragon's head, phoenix's tail, and multicolored patterns", and equated it with the wind god Feilian (飛廉).

== Proper names ==
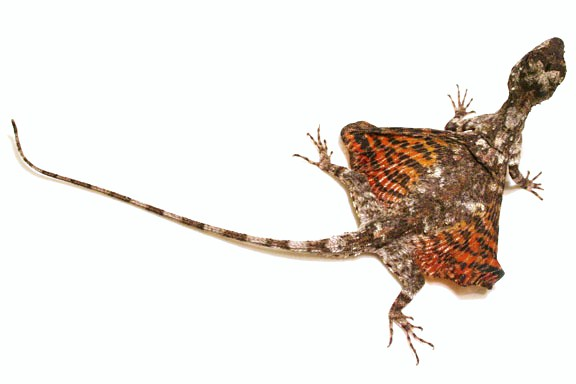
Draco volans

The Flying Dragon by Alexander Calder (1975), at the Art Institute of Chicago

Feilong, Hiryū, and Flying Dragon commonly occur in names.

Chinese Feilong (flying dragon) is also used to name:

- Feilong, a jumping kick in martial arts
- Fei Lung, a British-built gunboat in the Guangdong Fleet
- Fei Long (FL), a family of Silkworm missiles (e.g., the C-101)
- Fei-Long, a video game character in the Street Fighter series
- Fei Long, a tribe in Survivor: China television series
- FEILONG, call sign of China Flying Dragon Aviation
- Feilong, a series of loitering munition developed by Norinco
- Fei lung maang jeung (飛龍猛将) or Dragons Forever, a Hong Kong action cinema
- Yang Feilong (楊飛龍), a 3rd-century ruler of Chouchi
- Fu Feilong (苻飛龍), a 4th-century deputy of Fu Pi
- Ling Fei-long (嶺飛龍), a character in the Dragon Fist manga
- Liu Fei Long (刘飛龍), a character in Target in the Finder manga

Japanese Hiryū (flying dragon) names:

- Hiryū, a Japanese aircraft carrier
- Hiryū, a type of Mitsubishi Ki-67 medium bomber
- Hiryū, a chess piece in Dai shogi
- Hiryū no ken (飛龍の拳) Flying Dragon, a video game
- Hiryū002, a train in The Galaxy Railways anime series
- Strider Hiryu, a video game character
- There is a minor My Hero Academia (a manga and anime) character named Hiryu Rin. He is from China and his Chinese name is Feilong Lin.

English has additional Feilong "Flying Dragon" names.

- Feilongus, a genus of pterosaurs
- Feilongshania, a genus of trilobites
- Flying dragon or Draco volans, a species of Agaminae gliding lizards
- Flying Dragon, a sculpture by Alexander Calder
