= Xiao (mythology) =

Creatures in Chinese mythology

In Chinese mythology, the xiao is the name of several creatures, including the xiao (Chinese: 囂; pinyin: xiāo; Wade–Giles: hsiao^{1}) "a long-armed ape" or "a four-winged bird" and shanxiao (Chinese: 山魈; pinyin: shānxiāo) "mischievous, one-legged mountain spirit". Furthermore, some Western sources misspell and misconstrue the older romanization hsiao as "hsigo" [sic] "a flying monkey".

== Chinese Xiao ==
夒; náo, oracle ("shell and bone") writing

夒; náo seal script

Xiao or Hsiao (simplified Chinese: 嚣; traditional Chinese: 囂; pinyin: xiāo; Wade–Giles: hsiao; lit. 'clamor'), alternately pronounced Ao (pinyin: aó; Wade–Giles: ao), is a mythological creature described as resembling either an ape or a bird.

The Chinese word xiao (囂) means "noise; clamor; hubbub; haughty; proud; arrogant". During the Shang dynasty (c. 1600–1046 BCE), Xiao was both the name of a historical capital (near modern Zhengzhou in Henan province) during the era of King Zhong Ding (r. c. 1421–1396 BCE), and the given name of King Geng Ding (r. c. 1170–1147 BCE).

The Chinese character (囂) for xiao ideographically combines the radicals kou (口; "mouth"), quadrupled as 㗊 and ye (頁; "head"), thus signifying "many voices". The first Chinese character dictionary, the (121 CE) Shuowen Jiezi defines xiao (囂) as sheng (聲; "sound; noise"), and cryptically says "qi is emitted on top of the head" (气出頭上), which Duan Yucai's commentary explains as "noise is emitted and qi follows it" (聲出而气隨之).

The Shanhaijing "Classic of Mountains and Seas" uses Xiao (some editions write the graphic variant 嚻) as the name of a river (囂水; Xiaoshui), a mountain (北囂之山; Beixiao zhi shan), and two mythical creatures.

The first Xiao, which supposedly resembles a yu (禺; "monkey; ape"), is found on the western mountain Yuci (羭次),

Seventy leagues further west is a mountain called Mount Ewenext. … There is an animal on this mountain which looks like an ape, but it has longer arms and it is good at throwing things. Its name is the hubbub.

One hundred ninety li farther west stands Black-Ewe Mountain … There is a beast here whose form resembles a Yu-Ape but with longer arms. It is adept at throwing things and is called the Xiao … Noisy-Ape.

The Chinese mythologist Yuan Ke suggests that xiao (囂) is a copyist's error for the graphically and phonologically similar nao (夒 "a kind of monkey"). The historical linguist Axel Schuessler reconstructs Old Chinese nao < *nû (夒), xiao < *hâu (囂) or ao < *ŋâu (囂), and yu < *ŋoh (禺).

The second Hsiao, a mythological hybrid resembling Kuafu (夸父) the legendary giant who chased the sun, is found on the northern mountain Liangqu (梁渠),

Three hundred and fifty leagues further north is a mountain called Mount Bridgedrain. … There is a bird here which looks like the boastfather; it has four wings, one eye, and a dog's tail. Its name is the hubbub. It makes a noise like a magpie. If you eat it, it will cure a bellyache, and it is effective for indigestion.

There is a bird dwelling here whose form resembles Kuafu the Boaster but with four wings, one eye, and a dog's tail. It is called the Raucous-Bird, and it makes a sound like a magpie. Eating it will cure abdominal pain, and it can also stop diarrhea.

Although this passage compares the Xiao bird with the humanoid Kuafu, the Shanhaijing commentary of Guo Pu (276–324) says an early textual version writes the Jufu (舉父), who is also described as yu "monkey; ape". The sub-commentary of Hao Yixing (郝懿行; 1757–1825) notes the association may be owing to the similar sounding names Kuafu and Jufu. The relevant passage concerns the mountain Chongwu (崇吾),

The first peak of the Classic of the Western Mountains, Part III, is called Mount Worshipmy. … There is an animal here which looks like an ape but its forearms have markings like a leopard or tiger, and it is good at throwing things. Its name is the liftfather.

The first mountain along the third guideway through the Western Mountains is called Mount Chongwu. … There is a beast here who form resembles a Yu-Ape with leopard and tiger markings on its arms. It is adept at throwing things and is called the Jufu … Lifter

The flying monkey in ancient China was sometimes simply referenced by the term fēináo (飛猱; 'flying monkey'), as in the poem "On the White Horse", by Cao Zhi (though, in this case, náo particularly implies a type of monkey with yellowish hair color): and also, in this case, the meaning of "fly" extends metaphorically to "go quickly; dart; high".

== Chinese Shanxiao ==
Shanxiao or Shan-hsiao (Chinese: 山魈; pinyin: shānxiāo; Wade–Giles: shan-hsiao; lit. 'mountain imp') referred to "a short, one-legged, crayfish-eating simian creature that lived in the western mountains". In Modern Standard Chinese usage, shanxiao is the name for the African "mandrill monkey; Mandrillus sphinx".

After analyzing numerous stories about shanxiao "hill-spirits", the Dutch sinologist Jan Jakob Maria de Groot believes that,

… the Chinese place in their great class of hill-spirits certain quadrumana, besides actual human beings, mountaineers alien to Chinese culture, perhaps a dying race of aborigines, who, occasionally making raids upon their more refined neighbours, were chastised and victimized by merciless mandarins. No doubt the Chinese rank among them human monsters and mongrels which strike the imagination by their oddity.

The Shanhaijing has two early references to shanxiao, named with a manuscript lacuna and shanhui 山𤟤.

There is a bird here which looks like an owl and it has a human face, a monkey's body, and a dog's tail. Its name comes from its call: [lacuna]. Whenever it appears, that town will have a severe drought. (Yanzi Mountain 崦嵫之山, where the sun sets)

There is an animal on this mountain which looks like a dog but it has a human face. It is good at throwing. When it sees a human being, it laughs. Its name is the mountain-monkey. It moves like the wind. Whenever it appears, there will be typhoons over all under the sky. (Yufa Mountain 獄法之山)

Compare the former shanxiao description with the Chinese hsiao in Jorge Luis Borges's The Book of Imaginary Beings,

The Hsiao is a bird similar to a hawk, but it has the head of a man, the body of a monkey, and the tail of a dog. Its appearance presages harsh droughts.

Although Borges cites "T'ai Kuang Chi" as the Chinese source, referring to the (10th-century) Taiping guangji "Extensive Records of the Taiping Era", this description is not found there. The Chinese Text Project's searchable Taiping guangji database lists 10 occurrences of shanxiao (山魈; "mountain elf")—none of which mention a hawk, man, monkey, or dog.

Dongfang Shuo's (c. 2nd century CE) Shenyijing (神異經; "Classic of Divine Marvels") writes shanxiao as shansao with a rare sao character (combining the 犭"dog" radical and a can 參 phonetic).

Deep in the mountains of the West human beings exist, more than a chang in size. They go naked, and catch frogs and crabs. They are not shy of men, and when they see them halt to pass the night, they betake themselves to their fire, to roast their frogs and crabs. They also watch the moment on which the men are absent, and steal their salt, to eat their frogs and crabs with. They are called hill-sao, because they cry out this sound themselves. People have cast bamboo in their fires, which, on exploding therein, leapt out of it and scared the sao away altogether. When an attack is made on them, they cause their assailants to catch fever. Although these beings have a human shape, they take other forms, and thus belong also to the class of kwei and mei [gui (鬼; "devils") and mei (魅; "demons")]. Nowadays their abodes occur everywhere in the mountains.

Some Shenyijing editions say shanxiao are taller than a zhang (丈; "3.3 meters") while others say a chi (尺; "0.3 meter").

Ge Hong's (c. 320) Baopuzi "Master who Embraces Simplicity" lists four shanjing (山精; "mountain essence"), meaning shanxiao: the Qi (蚑; "crawl; walk") or Renei (熱內; "hot inside"), the Hui (暉) (or 夔; Kui), the Jinlei (金累; "gold weary"), and Feifei (飛飛; "fly fly"), cf. Feilong (飛龍; "flying dragon").

The mountain power in the form of a little boy hopping backward on one foot likes to come and harm people. If you hear a human voice at night in the mountains talking loud, its name is Ch'i. By knowing this name and shouting it, you will prevent it from harming you. Another name for it is Jo-nei; you may use both these names together. There is another mountain power, this one in the shape of a drum, colored red, and also with only one foot. Its name is Hui. Still another power has the shape of a human being nine feet tall, dressed in fur-lined clothes and wearing a large straw hat. Its name is Chin-lei. Another is like a dragon, variegated in color and with red horns, the name being Fei-fei. Whenever one of these appears, shout its name, and it will not dare harm you.

Li Shizhen's (1578) Bencao Gangmu classic materia medica discusses the shanxiao under the feifei (狒狒; "a man-eating monkey with long hair") entry.

The book Shenyi Jing by Dongfang Shuo: In the deep mountains in the west, there is a kind of animal in the form of a human being but just over one chi tall. It is naked. It catches shrimp and crabs, and roasts them over fire and eats then. Such an animal is called Shanxiao. It cries in a way as if it is calling its own name. When a man offends such an animal, he will suffer from chills and fever. This is a disease caused by evil. The animal may appear anywhere. But it is afraid of the piercing noise of firecrackers. The book Youming Lü by Liu Yiqing: Among the mountain cliffs in Dongchang County, there is an animal that looks like a human being. It is four to five chi tall. It is naked and has disheveled hair, five to six cun long. It shouts loudly. It is very difficult to sight one. It turns over stones in streams to catch shrimp and crabs, which it roasts over a fire and eats. The book Yongji Ji: There is a kind of Shangui in Anguo County. It looks like a human being but has only one leg. It is just over one chi tall. It steals salt from woodcutters to eat with the stone crabs that it roasts over fire. Human beings dare not offend it. If a person offends or hurts such a creature, the person may become sick or his house will be burned down. The book Xuanzhong Ji: Shanjing looks like a human being. It has one leg and is about three to four chi tall. It eats mountain crabs. It hides itself during the day and comes out at night. A 11,000-year-old toad can eat it. The book Baopuzi: Shanjing looks like a baby. It has only one leg, which is turned backwards. It attacks people at night. It is called a Ji. When it attacks, one should just call out its name. Then it will not able to attack a person. The book Baize Tu: There is a kind of mountain spirit called Kui that is shaped like a drum. It is red and walks on its single leg. People drive it to catch tigers and leopards. The book Hailu Suishi: There is a kind of animal in the area south of the Five Ridges that has one leg and a reversed heel. There are three digits on each hand and foot. The male is called Shanzhang, and the female Shangu. It knocks on doors at night to beg for things. The book Shenyi Jing: There is a kind of animal called Ba or Hanmu in the south. It is two to three chi tall. It is naked, and its eyes are on the top of its head. It runs as fast as the wind. When such an animal is sighted, there will be a major drought. When such a thing is encountered, the person should throw it into a manure pit. In this way the drought can be avoided. The book Wenzi Zhigui: Hanba is a kind of mountain ghost. When it stays in a place, no rain will fall there. When a female Ba enters a house, it may steal things. When a male Ba enters a house, it kidnaps the woman. Li Shizhen's comment: The above books recorded creatures that are more or less similar. All of them are ghosts and devils. Now such a creature is called "one-legged ghost" In the past it was reported that such creatures existed everywhere. They hid themselves and sneaked into houses to copulate with the women in the house, causing trouble and disease. They might set fires or steal things from houses. Taoist masters could not drive them away, and no medicine could treat these diseases. So people worshipped it as a spirit to plead for peace. But nobody knew the nature of such things. This is recorded here for reference. When such a thing appears, one of the ways to throw off its evil is to call out its name. In this way it will not harm people. A 1,000-year-old toad can eat it. These are ways to control it, and there must be other ways to control it too. There is also a kind of Zhiniao, a bird recorded in the "Category of the Fowls" that is also a creature that harms people. There are plenty of such harmful spirits and ghosts in this world. Such things are recorded in the books Baize Tu, Xuanzhong Ji, Baopuzi and Youyang Zaju. We have to know about them. But if a man behaves virtuously, such ghosts dare not approach him. This is one way to protect oneself.

The sociologist Wolfram Eberhard says shanxiao "were referred to by a great variety of names, some of which were different writings of a dialectical word in one of the southern dialects while others probably were variant readings". Regarding names for the mythological one-legged mountain creatures xiao and kui, Eberhard says, "This information proved that one of the two series of names for the imps (hsiao, ch'ao, ts'ao, etc.) came from the languages of the Yue and Yao, while the second series (k'ui, kui, hui) came from a more western language". Mentioned above are the Shanhaijing's shanhui (山𤟤), Shenyijing's shansao (山 and 犭+參), and Baopuzi qi (蚑; "crawl"), renei (熱內; "hot inside"), etc. The Nuogaoji 諾皋記, copied in Duan Chengshi's (863) Youyang zazu ("Miscellaneous Morsels from Youyang"), lists ten other variant names – shanxiao (山蕭) with "desolate", shansao (山臊; "urine smell"), shanmei (山魅; "a demon"), shanhui (山暉; "sunshine"), shanluo (山駱; "camel"), shanjiao (山蛟; "a dragon"), zhorou (濯肉; "wash meat"), rerou (熱肉; "hot meat"), feilong (飛龍; "flying dragon"), and zhiwu (治烏; "manage crow"). Additional names include shansao (山繅) with "reel silk from cocoons" and shantu (山都; "metropolis"). De Groot suggests, "All those terms are applied by Chinese authors indifferently to whatever demons play tricks upon man and disturb his peace, and which we may take to represent for China the broad class of sprites, elves, fairies and hobgoblins, with which mankind generally peoples forests; rocks and hills, increasing their ranks daily with souls of the dead buried abroad."

After discussing numerous Chinese accounts of the shanxiao, Eberhard concludes

The concept of the shan-hsiao, very common among Miao tribes in present-day Kuichou existed only in South China from Yünnan to Chekiang since early times. The belief seems to have originated in the west because the older sources emphasized that the shan-hsiao lived in the western mountains. Their characteristics were: being one-legged and of short stature, similar to monkeys, living in trees, being afraid of crashing noises but loving music, being more like an imp or good-natured goblin than truly malicious. In my opinion the descriptions leave no room for doubt that these goblins hung together with monkeys, just like the mu-k'o [木客 "tree guest"]. The original carriers of these stories seem to have been Yao peoples, because only Yao were distributed over this whole area. There seems to be some indication that the shan-hsiao were a kind of spirit of the dead.

== Chinese Xiaoyang ==
Xiaoyang or Hsiao-yang (梟楊; 'owl poplar') is a final example of Chinese mythological xiaos. This xiao is an archaic name for "owl" (貓頭鷹; maotouying, "cat-head hawk" in modern usage), and the Yang clan in southwestern China were supposedly descended from monkeys. The variant transcription xiaoyang (梟羊; "owl goat") names the legendary feifei (狒狒), "a man-eating monkey with long hair", which is the modern Chinese name for "baboon".

The Ai shi ming "Alas That My Lot Was Not Cast" poem in the Chuci ("Songs of the South") is the first reference to Xiao Yang.

Above, I seek out holy hermits. I enter into friendship with Red Pine; I join Wang Qiao as his companion. We send the Xiao Yang in front to guide us; The White Tiger runs back and forth in attendance. Floating on cloud and mist, we enter the dim height of heaven; Riding on white deer we sport and take our pleasure.

The British sinologist David Hawkes notes Xiao Yang was "an anthropoid monster whose upper lip covers his face when he laughs. His laughter was sinister, it was said, being an indication that he was about to eat human flesh"; and glosses, "A hideous man-eating demon living in solitary places."

== Popular culture ==
The Dungeons & Dragons Rules Cyclopedia lists:

Hsiao (Guardian Owl) The hsiao (sh-HOW) are a race of peaceful cleric-philosophers who inhabit woodlands and forests. Hsiao look like giant owls with broad feathered wings and large intelligent golden eyes. These creatures live in trees, making earthen nests and tunnels high above the forest floor. The hsiao know and work closely with other woodland creatures (including actaeons, centaurs, dryads, elves, treants, and unicorns), and may call on them for aid. Their goals include the preservation of woodland wilderness against intrusions by dangerous humanoids.

Note this D&D name's evident connection with Chinese hsiao or xiao meaning "owl".

The Advanced Dungeons & Dragons sourcebook Oriental Adventures contains the shan sao, which also appears in The Book of Lairs II. The creature is depicted as a foot-high humanoid that lives in bamboo thickets, works with tigers, and cooks a valuable stew.

== Non-Chinese mistaken "Hsigo" ==
Numerous modern print and internet resources give a ghost word of Chinese "Hsigo" "a flying monkey" [sic]. However, hsigo, which is not a possible romanization of Chinese, is a common typographical error for Hsiao. For two examples,

Hsigo A Chinese composite creature, having a man's face, a monkey's body, dog tail and bird wings.

Hsigo–The Chinese Hsigo are much like the flying monkeys from The Wizard of Oz. I think they are probably based on fruit bats, or "flying foxes," of India, Asia, Indonesia and Australia. These monkey-size bats are not related to the other insectivorous bats, but are genetically closer to primates.

Victor H. Mair noted on Language Log that,

If you do a web search for "Hsigo", you will find thousands of references and hundreds of images. I won't give specific references, because they're all complete and utter nonsense, but you can read detailed descriptions of these fake, mythical Chinese monkeys—including pseudo-learned discussions of their name—in works like the following: Erudite Tales, Creepy Hollows Encyclopedia, Mythical Creatures Guide, Encyclo, Societas Magic, Monstropedia, etc., etc. Hsigo are supposedly flying monkeys with bird-like wings, the tail of a dog, and a human face.

== See also ==
- Simians (Chinese poetry)
