= Chinese corvette Kwan Chia =

Imperial Chinese warship

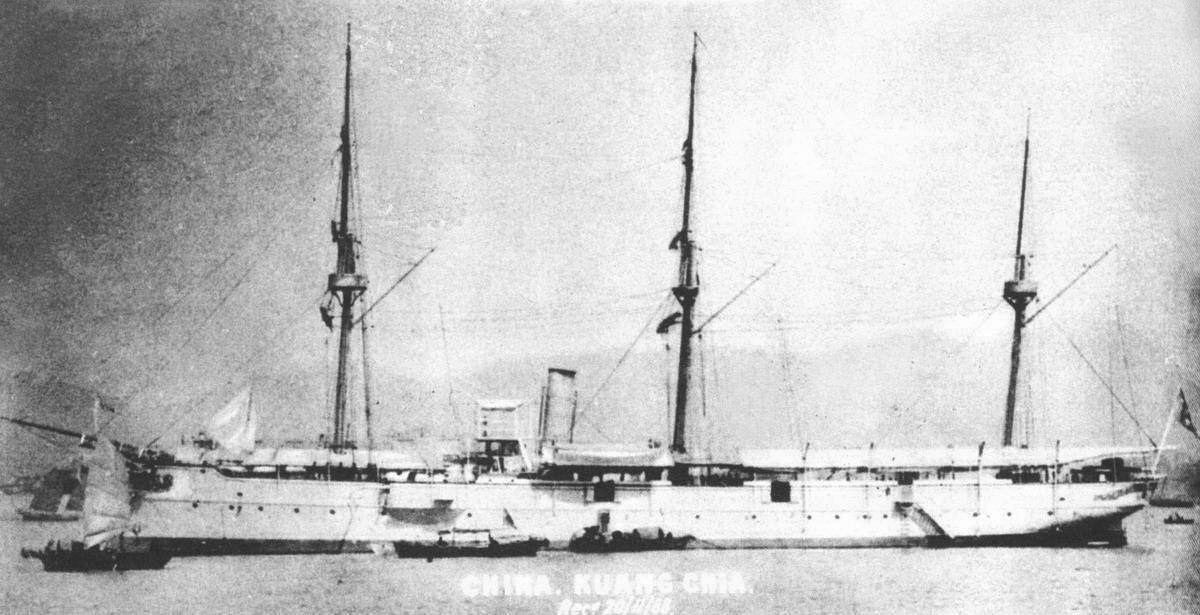

History

Imperial China
- Name: Kwan Chia
- Builder: Foochow Navy Yard
- Completed: 1887
- Homeport: Canton

General characteristics
- Type: Composite cruiser/corvette
- Displacement: 1,296 long tons (1,317 t)
- Length: 67.665 m (222 ft 0 in)
- Beam: 10.21 m (33 ft 6 in)
- Draught: 3.81 m (12 ft 6 in)
- Speed: 16 knots (18 mph; 30 km/h)
- Complement: 180
- Armament: 1 × Krupp 150 mm (5.9 in) gun; 4 × Krupp 120 mm (4.7 in) guns; 6 × 37 mm guns

Kwan Chia (Chinese: 广甲), often called Guangjia, was a 1,296-ton composite cruiser, often called a corvette, in service with the Imperial Chinese Guangdong Fleet. Total officers and crew were 180. The ship's maximum speed was 16 knots (30 km/h; 18 mph).

== Design ==
Kwan Chia was built at the Foochow Navy Yard in 1887. Her hull was composite-built, with wooden planking over an iron frame. She displaced 1,296 tons and had a length of 67.665 m (222 ft 0 in). She had a single screw that pushed her through the water at 16 knots (30 km/h; 18 mph). By the time she was completed she was obsolete, but her armament was fairly modern, consisting of four 4.7-inch (120 mm) and one 5.9-inch (150 mm) Krupp breech-loading guns. Two of her 4.7-inch guns were on sponsons on either side of the ship near the bow, the other two were further aft on pivot mounts inboard, and the 5.9-inch gun was on the stern.

== Naval service ==
She was built for the Guangdong Fleet, one of the Imperial Chinese Navy's four regional fleets. Nothing is known of her early career, but she along with several other ships of the Guangdong Fleet was present at the 1894 Battle of the Yalu River during the First Sino-Japanese War, on 17 September 1894. She made up a fighting pair with the Beiyang Fleet cruiser Jiyuan. She was probably destroyed by the Japanese fast cruiser squadron after Jiyuan withdrew with damage, or possibly she steamed back to Weihaiwei as soon as possible. The first fate is most likely, as one of the enemy cruisers was capable of 24 knots (44 km/h; 28 mph) to her 16 knots, and they had far more powerful guns.
