= Sino-French War =

1884–1885 conflict between France and China

- Part of the French conquest of Vietnam and the Tonkin campaign
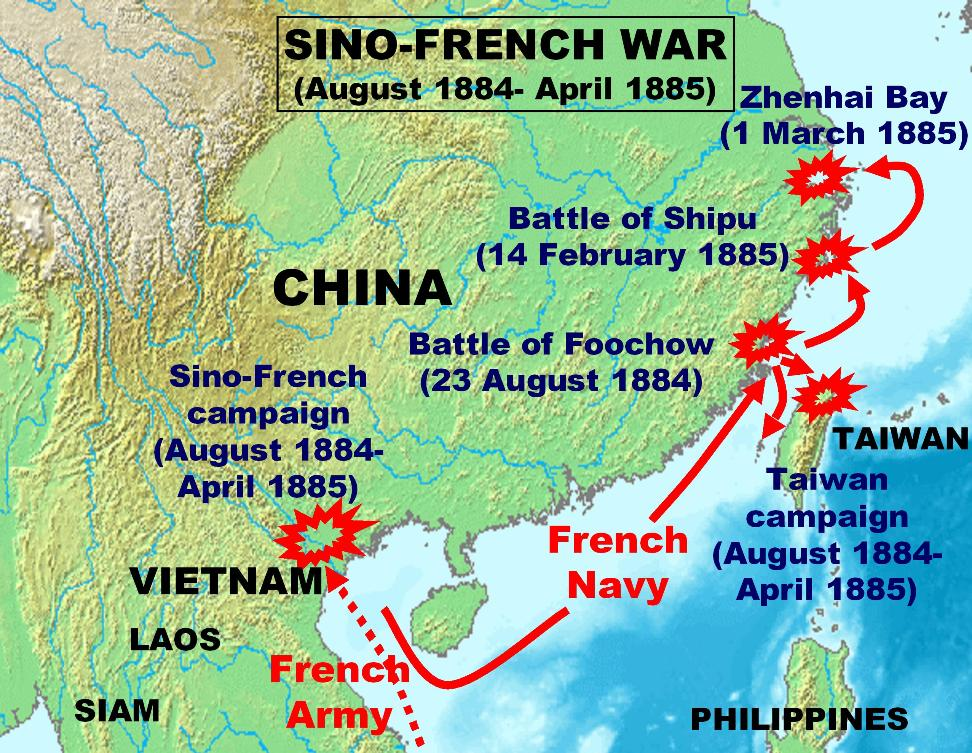
- Operations of the Sino-French War
Date	22 August 1884 – 4 April 1885 (7 months, 1 week and 6 days)
Location	Southeast China, Taiwan, Northern Vietnam
Result	See § Aftermath
Territorial changes	French protectorates of Tonkin and Annam recognized by China

Belligerents
France	China; Black Flag Army

Commanders and leaders
Jules Ferry; Amédée Courbet; Sébastien Lespès; Louis Brière de l'Isle; François de Négrier; Laurent Giovanninelli; Jacques Duchesne	Cixi; Prince Gong; Pan Dingxin; Feng Zicai; Tang Jingsong; Liu Mingchuan; Sun Kaihua; Liu Yongfu

Strength
Vietnam: French army: 25,000; Local irregulars: 6,000; Taiwan: Army: 3,000; Navy: 11 warships	Vietnam: Yunnan army: 50,000; Guangxi-Guangdong army: 40,000+; Black Flag Army: 5,000; Local irregulars: 20,000; Taiwan: Regulars: 16,000; Irregulars: 20,000

Casualties and losses
Clodfelter: 4,200 killed and wounded; 5,223 died of disease; Mounier-Kuhn: 811 killed; 2,093 wounded; Unknown died of disease	At least 10,000 killed; Unknown wounded; Yunnan army: 20,000 people did not return to their home country (Note: The 滇 Army had nearly 50,000 troops during the Sino-French War. However, due to the toll of the war (such as the Siege of Tuyên Quang, where the 滇 Army suffered over 1,000 killed and more than 2,000 wounded), deaths from tropical diseases (for instance, during the second expedition of the 滇 Army abroad until their return, over 200 officers and more than 3,000 soldiers succumbed to such diseases), and a portion of the troops refusing to return to China, the 滇 army had only about 30,000 men return to their home country.); Other troops: Unknown

The Sino-French or Franco-Chinese War, (Note: Traditional Chinese: 中法戰爭; simplified Chinese: 中法战争; pinyin: Zhōngfǎ zhànzhēng; Vietnamese: 戰爭法清 Chiến tranh Pháp-Thanh; French: Guerre franco-chinoise) also known as the Tonkin War, was a limited conflict fought from August 1884 to April 1885 between the French Third Republic and the Qing dynasty for the suzerainty of Vietnam. There was no declaration of war.

The Qing armies performed better than in their other nineteenth-century wars. Although French forces emerged victorious from most engagements, the Qing scored noteworthy successes on land, notably forcing the French to hastily withdraw from occupied Lạng Sơn in the late stages of the war, thus gaining control of the town and its surroundings. However, a lack of foreign support, French naval supremacy, and northern threats posed by Russia and Japan forced the Qing to enter negotiations.

The Qing ceded to France its sphere of influence over Northern and Central Vietnam, which respectively became the protectorates of Tonkin and Annam. Both sides ratified the Treaty of Tientsin and no diplomatic gain was reaped by either nation. On another note, the war strengthened the dominance of Empress Dowager Cixi over the Qing government but France securing its strategic objective did not prevent the collapse of French Prime Minister Jules Ferry's government for whom the Tonkin Affair was ignominious.

== Prelude ==
French interest in northern Vietnam dated from the late 18th century, when the political Catholic priest Pigneau de Behaine recruited French volunteers to fight for Nguyễn Ánh and help begin the Nguyễn dynasty, in an attempt to gain privileges for France and for the Roman Catholic Church. France began its colonial campaign in 1858, annexing several southern provinces in 1862 to form the colony of Cochinchina.

French explorers followed the course of the Red River through northern Vietnam to its source in Yunnan, arousing hopes for a profitable trade route with China that could bypass the treaty ports of the Chinese coastal provinces. The main obstacle to this idea, the Black Flag Army – a well-organized private army led by the formidable Liu Yongfu – was levying exorbitant "taxes" on Red River trade between Sơn Tây and Lào Cai on the Yunnan border.

In 1873, a small French force commanded by Lieutenant de Vaisseau Francis Garnier, exceeding his instructions, attacked northern Vietnam. Following a series of French victories against the Vietnamese, the Vietnamese government called on Liu Yongfu's Black Flags, who defeated Garnier's force beneath the walls of Hanoi. Garnier was killed in this battle, and the French government later disavowed his expedition.

=== Henri Rivière's expedition in Tonkin ===
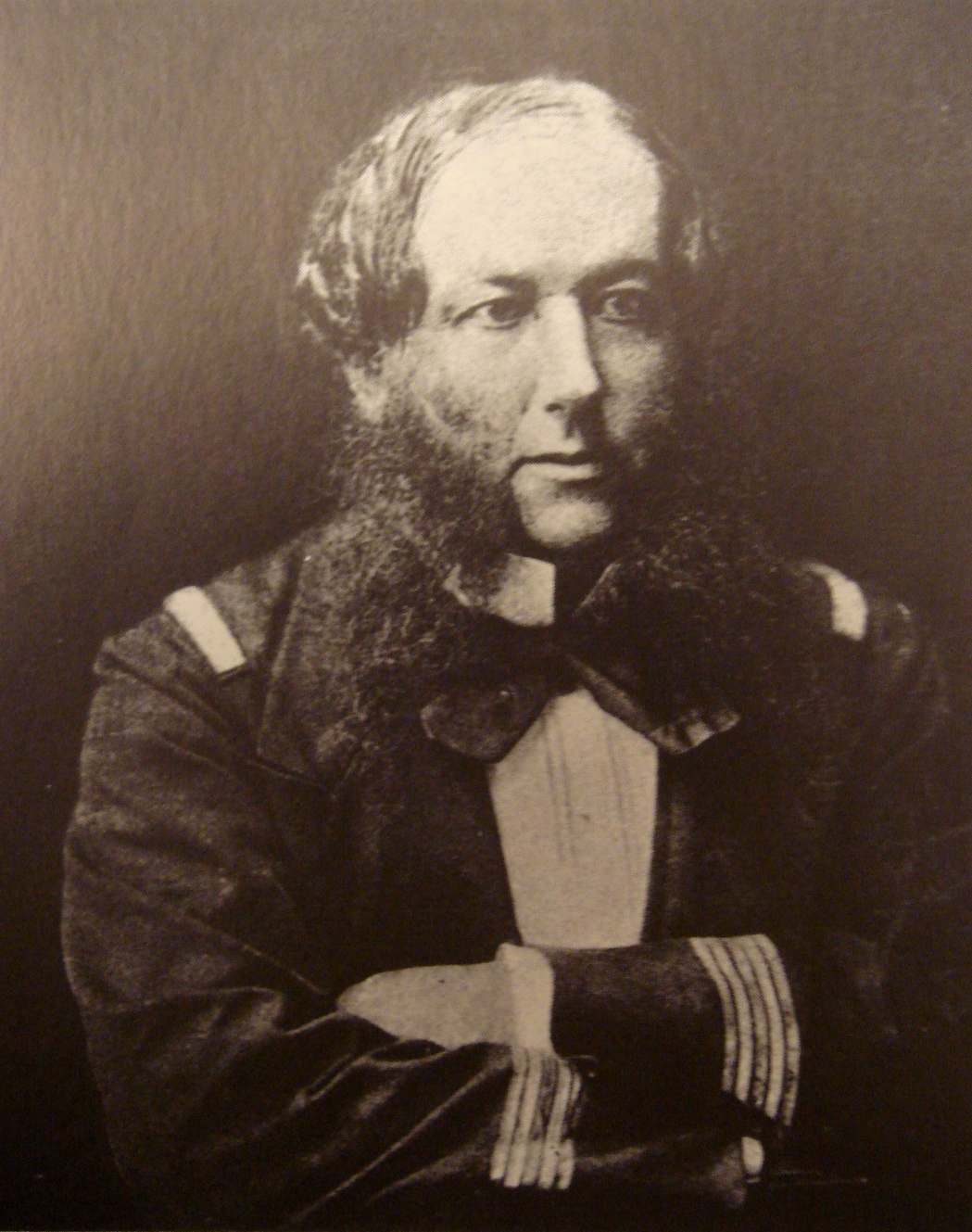
Commandant Henri Rivière (1827–83)

In 1881, French Commandant Henri Rivière was sent with a small military force to Hanoi to investigate Vietnamese complaints about the activities of French merchants. In defiance of the instructions of his superiors, Rivière stormed the citadel of Hanoi on 25 April 1882. Although Rivière subsequently returned the citadel to Vietnamese control, his recourse to force provoked alarm both in Vietnam and in China.

The Vietnamese government, unable to confront Rivière with its own ramshackle army, once again enlisted the help of Liu Yongfu, whose well-trained and seasoned Black Flag soldiers would prove a thorn in the side of the French. The Vietnamese also sought for Chinese support. Vietnam had long been a tributary state of China, and China agreed to arm and support the Black Flags, and to covertly oppose French operations in Tonkin. Tu Duc requested the Qing court for help, and by September 1882 large Chinese regular armies were dispatched to occupy Vietnamese territories north of the Red River and vital towns such as Lang Son and Son Tay.

The Qing court also sent a strong signal to the French that China would not allow Tonkin to fall under French control. In the summer of 1882, troops of the Chinese Yunnan Army and Guangxi Army crossed the border into Tonkin, occupying Lạng Sơn, Bắc Ninh, Hưng Hóa and other towns. The French minister to China, Frédéric Bourée, was so alarmed by the prospect of war with China that in November and December he negotiated a deal with the Chinese statesman Li Hongzhang to divide Tonkin into French and Chinese spheres of influence. Neither of the parties to these negotiations consulted the Vietnamese.

Rivière, disgusted at the deal cut by Bourée, decided early in 1883 to force the issue. He had recently been sent a battalion of marine infantry from France, giving him just enough men to venture beyond Hanoi. On 27 March 1883, to secure his line of communications from Hanoi to the coast, Rivière captured the citadel of Nam Định with a force of 520 French soldiers under his personal command. During his absence at Nam Định, the Black Flags and Vietnamese made an attack on Hanoi, but Chef de Bataillon Berthe de Villers repulsed them in the Battle of Gia Cuc (Gia Quất) on 28 March. Rivière jubilantly reacted: 'This will force them to take forward their Tonkin Question!'

Rivière had perfect timing. He had expected to be cashiered for his capture of Nam Định; instead he found himself the hero of the hour. There had recently been a change of government in France, and the new administration of Jules Ferry strongly favoured colonial expansion. It therefore decided to back Rivière. Ferry and Foreign Minister Paul-Armand Challemel-Lacour denounced Bourée's agreement with Li Hongzhang and recalled the hapless French minister. They also made it clear to the Chinese that they were determined to place Tonkin under French protection. In April 1883, realising that the Vietnamese lacked the means of resisting the French effectively, the Chinese civil Mandarin Tang Jingsong (唐景崧) persuaded Liu Yongfu to take the field against Rivière with the Black Flag Army. This resulted in a year of Liu Yongfu's forces fighting an unconventional war.

On 10 May 1883 Liu Yongfu challenged the French to battle in a taunting message widely placarded on the walls of Hanoi. On 19 May Rivière confronted the Black Flags in the Battle of Paper Bridge, and the French suffered a disastrous defeat. Rivière's small force (around 450 men) attacked a strong Black Flag defensive position near the village of Cầu Giấy, a few miles to the west of Hanoi, known to the French as Paper Bridge (Pont de Papier). After initial successes the French were eventually enveloped on both wings; only with difficulty could they regroup and fall back to Hanoi. Rivière, Berthe de Villers and several other senior officers were killed in this action.

== French intervention in Tonkin ==
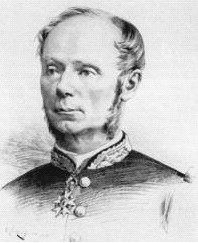
Admiral Anatole-Amédée-Prosper Courbet (1827–1885)

Rivière's death produced an angry reaction in France. Reinforcements were rushed to Tonkin, a threatened attack by the Black Flags on Hanoi was averted, and the military situation was stabilised.

=== Protectorate over Tonkin ===
On 20 August 1883 Admiral Amédée Courbet, who had recently been appointed to the command of the newly formed Tonkin Coasts Naval Division, stormed the forts which guarded the approaches to the Vietnamese capital Huế in the Battle of Thuận An, and forced the Vietnamese government to sign the Treaty of Huế, placing Tonkin under French protection.

At the same time the new commander of the Tonkin expeditionary corps, General Bouët, attacked the Black Flag positions on the Day River. Although the French mauled the Black Flag Army in the Battle of Phủ Hoài (15 August) and the Battle of Palan (1 September), they were unable to capture all of Liu Yongfu's positions, and in the eyes of the world the battles were tantamount to French defeats. Bouët was widely held to have failed in his mission, and resigned in September 1883. In the event, severe flooding eventually forced Liu Yongfu to abandon the line of the Day River and fall back to the fortified city of Sơn Tây, several miles to the west.

=== Confrontation between France and China ===
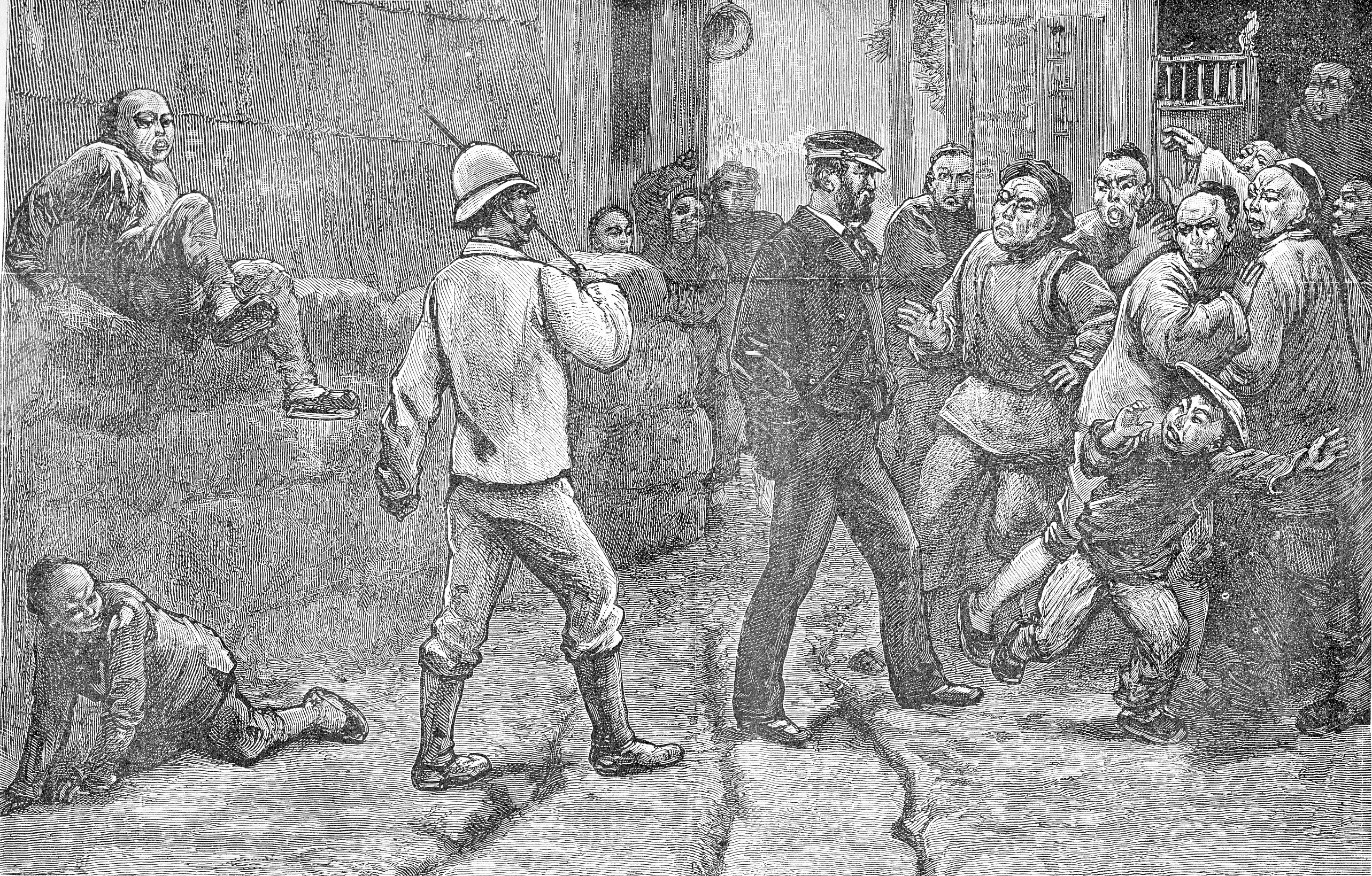
European residents walk warily in the streets of Guangzhou, autumn 1883.

The French prepared for a major offensive at the end of the year to annihilate the Black Flags, and tried to persuade China to withdraw its support for Liu Yongfu, while attempting to win the support of the other European powers for the projected offensive. However, negotiations in Shanghai in July 1883 between the French minister Arthur Tricou and Li Hongzhang were terminated by the Qing government on receipt of a naively optimistic assessment by Marquis Zeng Jize, the Chinese minister to Paris, that the French government had no stomach for a full-scale war with China. Jules Ferry and the French foreign minister Paul-Armand Challemel-Lacour met a number of times in the summer and autumn of 1883 with Marquis Zeng in Paris, but these parallel diplomatic discussions also proved abortive. The Chinese stood firm, and refused to withdraw substantial garrisons of Chinese regular troops from Sơn Tây, Bắc Ninh and Lạng Sơn, despite the likelihood that they would be shortly engaged in battle against the French. As war with China seemed increasingly likely, the French persuaded the German government to delay the release of Dingyuan and Zhenyuan, two modern battleships then being constructed in German shipyards for China's Beiyang Fleet. Meanwhile, the French consolidated their hold on the Delta by establishing posts at Quảng Yên, Hưng Yên and Ninh Bình.

The growing tension between France and China gave rise to anti-foreign demonstrations inside China during the autumn of 1883. The most serious incidents took place in Guangdong province, where Europeans were most prominent. Attacks were made on the property of European merchants in Guangzhou and on Shamian Island. Several European powers, including France, sent gunboats to Guangzhou to protect their nationals.

==== Sơn Tây and Bac Ninh ====
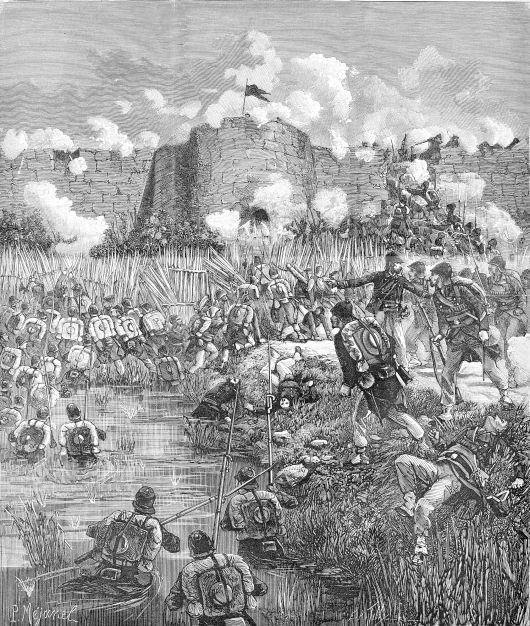
The capture of Sơn Tây, 16 December 1883

The French accepted that an attack on Liu Yongfu would probably result in an undeclared war with China, but calculated that a quick victory in Tonkin would force the Chinese to accept a fait accompli. Command of the Tonkin Campaign was entrusted to Courbet, who attacked Sơn Tây in December 1883. The Sơn Tây Campaign was the fiercest campaign the French had yet fought in Tonkin. Although the Chinese and Vietnamese contingents at Son Tay played little part in the defence, Liu Yongfu's Black Flags fought ferociously to hold the city. On 14 December the French assaulted the outer defences of Sơn Tây at Phù Sa, but were thrown back with heavy casualties. Hoping to exploit Courbet's defeat, Liu Yongfu attacked the French lines the same night, but the Black Flag attack also failed disastrously. After resting his troops on 15 December, Courbet again assaulted the defences of Sơn Tây on the afternoon of 16 December. This time the attack was thoroughly prepared by artillery, and delivered only after the defenders had been worn down. At 5 p.m. a Foreign Legion battalion and a battalion of marine fusiliers captured the western gate of Sơn Tây and fought their way into the town. Liu Yongfu's garrison withdrew to the citadel, and evacuated Sơn Tây under cover of darkness several hours later. Courbet had achieved his objective, but at considerable cost. French casualties at Sơn Tây were 83 dead and 320 wounded. The fighting at Sơn Tây also took a terrible toll of the Black Flags, and in the opinion of some observers broke them once and for all as a serious fighting force. Liu Yongfu felt that he had been deliberately left to bear the brunt of the fighting by his Chinese and Vietnamese allies, and determined never again to expose his troops so openly.

In March 1884, the French renewed their offensive under the command of General Charles-Théodore Millot, who took over responsibility for the land campaign from Courbet after the fall of Sơn Tây. Reinforcements from France and the African colonies had now raised the strength of the Tonkin Expeditionary Corps to over 10,000 men, and Millot organised this force into two brigades. The 1st Brigade was commanded by General Louis Brière de l'Isle, who had earlier made his reputation as governor of Senegal, and the 2nd Brigade was commanded by the charismatic young Foreign Legion general François de Négrier, who had recently quelled a serious Arab rebellion in Algeria. The French target was Bắc Ninh, garrisoned by a strong force of regular Chinese troops of the Guangxi Army. The Bắc Ninh Campaign was a walkover for the French. Morale in the Chinese army was low, and Liu Yongfu was careful to keep his experienced Black Flags out of danger. Millot bypassed Chinese defences to the southwest of Bắc Ninh, and assaulted the city on 12 March from the southeast, with complete success. The Guangxi Army put up a feeble resistance, and the French took the city with ease, capturing large quantities of ammunition and a number of brand new Krupp cannon.

==== The Tientsin Accord and the Treaty of Huế ====
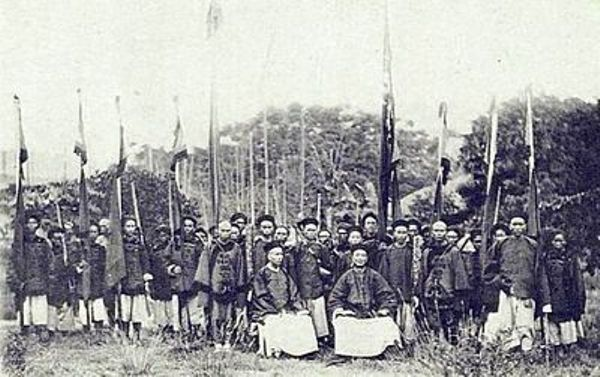
Chinese regular soldiers photographed during the Sino-French war

The defeat at Bắc Ninh, coming close on the heels of the fall of Sơn Tây, strengthened the hand of the moderate element in the Chinese government and temporarily discredited the extremist 'Purist' party led by Zhang Zhidong, which was agitating for a full-scale war against France. Further French successes in the spring of 1884, including the Capture of Hưng Hóa and Thái Nguyên, convinced the Empress Dowager Cixi that China should come to terms, and an accord was reached between France and China in May. The negotiations took place in Tianjin (Tientsin). Li Hongzhang, the leader of the Chinese moderates, represented China; and Captain François-Ernest Fournier, commander of the French cruiser Volta, represented France. The Tientsin Accord, concluded on 11 May 1884, provided for Chinese recognition of the French protectorate over Annam and Tonkin and withdrawal of Chinese troops from Tonkin, in return for a comprehensive treaty that would settle details of trade and commerce between France and China and provide for the demarcation of its disputed border with Vietnam.

On 6 June the French followed up their accord with China by concluding a fresh Treaty of Huế with the Vietnamese, which established a French protectorate over both Annam and Tonkin and allowed the French to station troops at strategic points in Vietnamese territory and to install residents in the main towns. The signature of the treaty was accompanied by an important symbolic gesture. The seal presented by the emperor of China several decades earlier to the Vietnamese emperor Gia Long was melted down in the presence of the French and Vietnamese plenipotentiaries, betokening the renunciation by Vietnam of its traditional links with China.

Fournier was not a professional diplomat, and the Tientsin Accord contained several loose ends. Crucially, it failed to explicitly state a deadline for the Chinese troop withdrawal from Tonkin. The French asserted that the troop withdrawal was to take place immediately, while the Chinese argued that the withdrawal was contingent upon the conclusion of the comprehensive treaty. In fact, the Chinese stance was an ex post facto rationalisation, designed to justify their unwillingness or inability to put the terms of the accord into effect. The accord was extremely unpopular in China, and provoked an immediate backlash. The war party called for Li Hongzhang's impeachment, and his political opponents intrigued to have orders sent to the Chinese troops in Tonkin to hold their positions.

==== The Bắc Lệ ambush ====
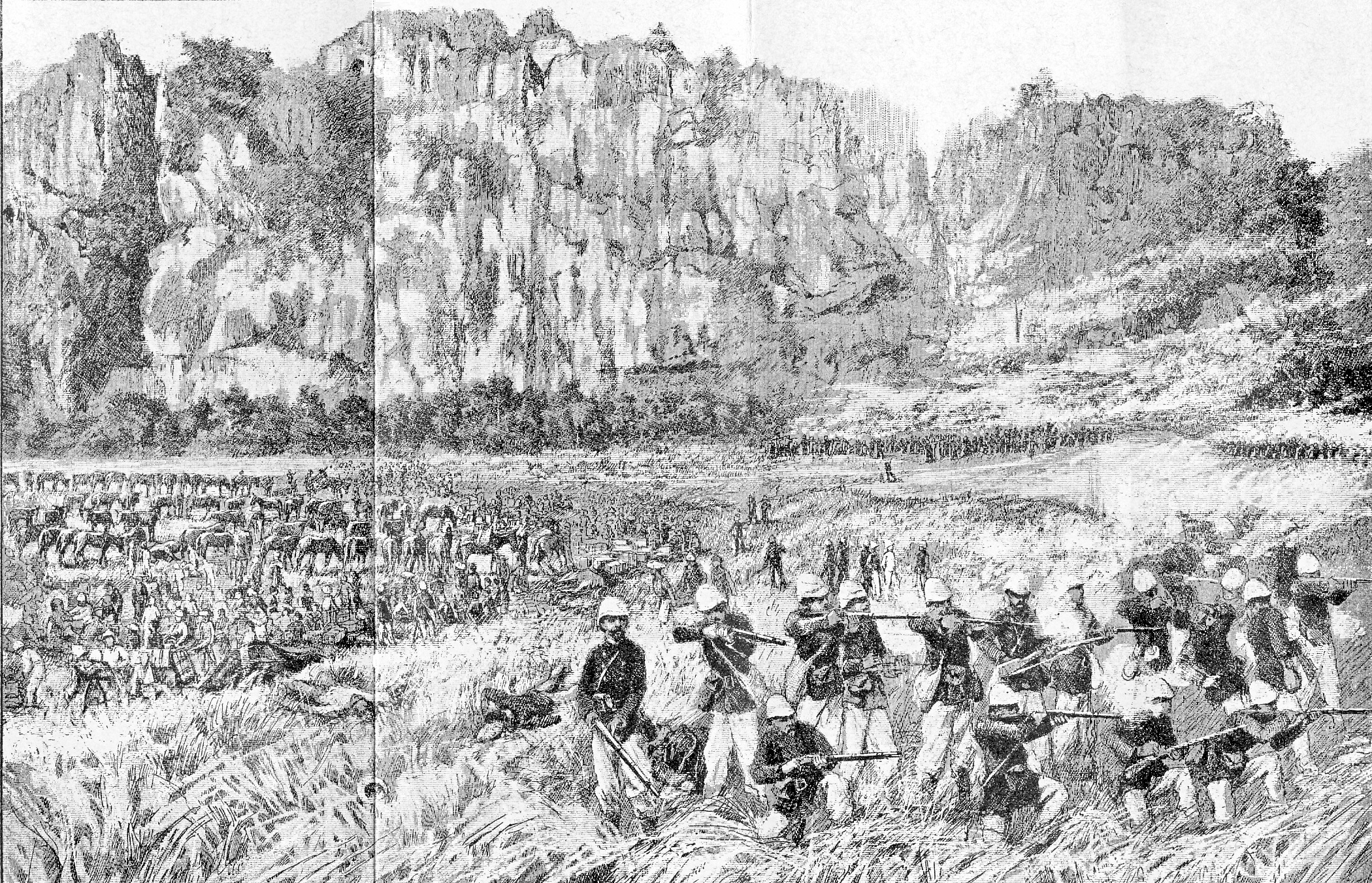
The Bắc Lệ ambush, 23 June 1884

Li Hongzhang hinted to the French that there might be difficulties in enforcing the accord, but nothing specific was said. The French assumed that the Chinese troops would leave Tonkin as agreed, and made preparations for occupying the border towns of Lạng Sơn, Cao Bằng and Thất Khê. In early June 1884 a French column under the command of Lieutenant-Colonel Alphonse Dugenne advanced to occupy Lạng Sơn. On 23 June, near the small town of Bắc Lệ, the French encountered a strong detachment of the Guangxi Army ensconced in a defensive position behind Thương River. In view of the diplomatic significance of this discovery, Dugenne should have reported the presence of the Chinese force to Hanoi and waited for further instructions. Instead, he gave the Chinese an ultimatum, and on their refusal to withdraw resumed his advance. The Chinese opened fire on the advancing French, precipitating a two-day battle in which Dugenne's column was encircled and seriously mauled. Dugenne eventually fought his way out of the Chinese encirclement and extricated his small force.

When news of the Bắc Lệ ambush reached Paris, there was fury at what was perceived as blatant Chinese treachery. Ferry's government demanded an apology, an indemnity, and the immediate implementation of the terms of the Tianjin Accord. The Chinese government agreed to negotiate, but refused to apologise or pay any indemnity. The mood in France was against compromise, and although negotiations continued throughout July, Courbet was ordered to take his squadron to Fuzhou (Foochow). He was instructed to prepare to attack the Chinese Fujian Fleet in the harbour and to destroy the Foochow Navy Yard. Meanwhile, as a preliminary demonstration of what would follow if the Chinese were recalcitrant, Rear Admiral Sébastien Lespès destroyed three Chinese shore batteries in the port of Keelung in northern Formosa (Taiwan) by naval bombardment on 5 August. The French put a landing force ashore to occupy Keelung and the nearby coal mines at Pei-tao (Pa-tou), as a 'pledge' (gage) to be bargained against a Chinese withdrawal from Tonkin, but the arrival of a large Chinese army under the command of the imperial commissioner Liu Mingchuan forced it to re-embark on 6 August.

== Sino-French War, August 1884 to April 1885 ==
=== Operations of Admiral Courbet's squadron ===
==== Fuzhou and the Min River ====
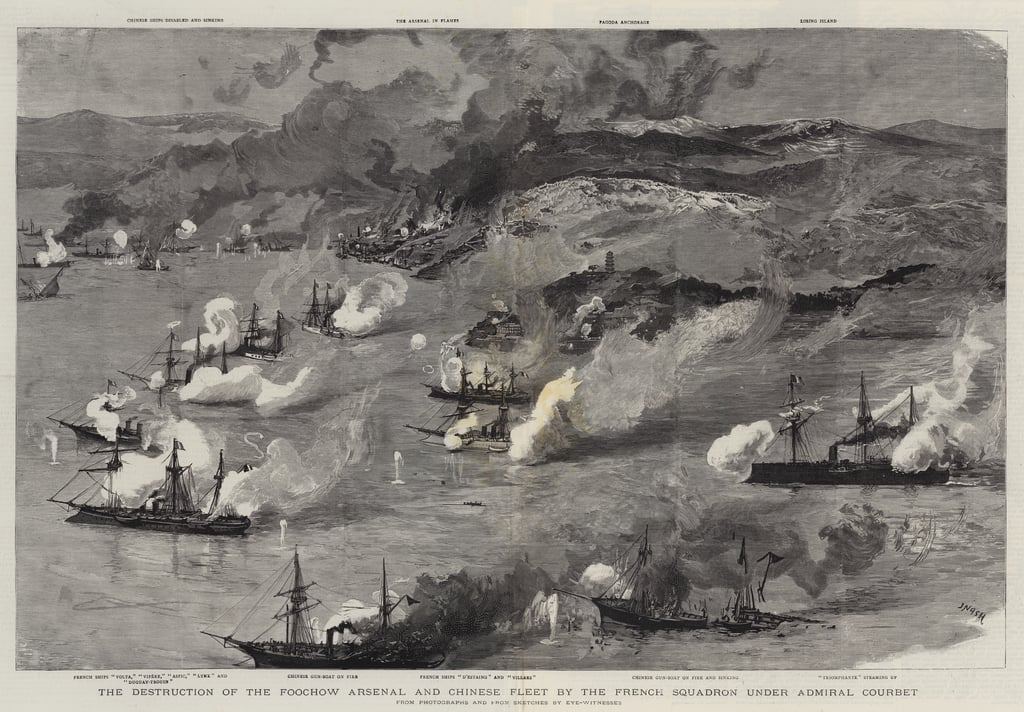
The Battle of Fuzhou, 23 August 1884, an engraving from The Graphic

Negotiations between France and China broke down in mid-August, and on 22 August Courbet was ordered to attack the Chinese fleet at Fuzhou. In the Battle of Fuzhou (also known as the Battle of the Pagoda Anchorage) on 23 August 1884, the French took their revenge for the Bắc Lệ Ambush. In a two-hour engagement watched with professional interest by neutral British and American vessels (the battle was one of the first occasions on which the spar torpedo was successfully deployed), Courbet's Far East Squadron annihilated China's outclassed Fujian fleet and severely damaged the Foochow Navy Yard (which, ironically, had been built under the direction of the French administrator Prosper Giquel). Nine Chinese ships were sunk in less than an hour, including the corvette Yangwu, the flagship of the Fujian fleet. Chinese losses may have amounted to 3,000 dead, while French losses were minimal. Courbet then successfully withdrew down the Min River to the open sea, destroying several Chinese shore batteries from behind as he took the French squadron through the Min'an and Jinpai passes.

==== Riots in Hong Kong ====
The French attack at Fuzhou effectively ended diplomatic contacts between France and China. Although neither country declared war, the dispute would now be settled on the battlefield. The news of the destruction of the Fujian fleet was greeted by an outbreak of patriotic fervour in China, marred by attacks on foreigners and foreign property. There was considerable sympathy for China in Europe, and the Chinese were able to hire a number of British, German and American army and navy officers as advisers.

Patriotic indignation spread to British Hong Kong. In September 1884 dock workers in Hong Kong refused to repair the French ironclad La Galissonnière, which had suffered shell damage in the August naval engagements. The strike collapsed at the end of September, but the dock workers were prevented from resuming their business by other groups of Chinese workers, including longshoremen, sedan chair carriers and rickshawmen. An attempt by the colonial authorities to protect the dock workers against harassment resulted in serious rioting on 3 October, during which at least one rioter was shot dead and several Sikh constables were injured. The British suspected, with good reason, that the disturbances had been fomented by the Chinese authorities in Guangdong province.

==== French occupation of Keelung ====
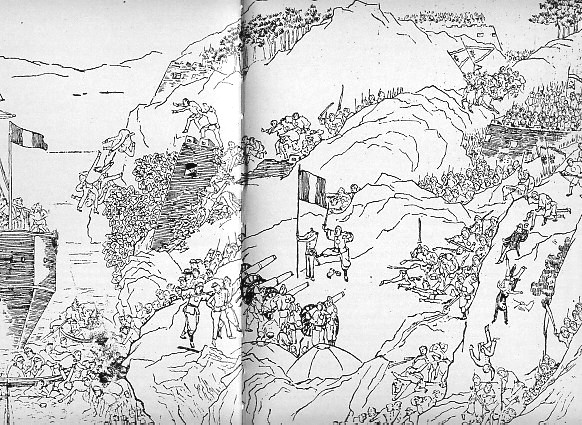
A Chinese depiction of the French landing at Keelung

Meanwhile, the French decided to put pressure on China by landing an expeditionary corps in northern Formosa to seize Keelung and Tamsui, redeeming the failure of 6 August and finally winning the 'pledge' they sought. On 1 October Lieutenant-Colonel Bertaux-Levillain landed at Keelung with a force of 1,800 marine infantry, forcing the Chinese to withdraw to strong defensive positions which had been prepared in the surrounding hills. The French force was too small to advance beyond Keelung, and the Pei-tao coal mines remained in Chinese hands. Meanwhile, after an ineffective naval bombardment on 2 October, Lespès attacked the Chinese defences at Tamsui with 600 sailors from his squadron's landing companies on 8 October, but was decisively repulsed by forces under the command of the Fujianese general Sun Kaihua (孫開華). As a result, French control over Formosa was limited to the town of Keelung, far short of what had been hoped for.

==== Blockade of Taiwan ====
Towards the end of 1884 the French were able to enforce a limited blockade of the northern Formosan ports of Keelung and Tamsui and the prefectural capital Taiwan (now Tainan) and the southern port Takow (Kaohsiung). In early January 1885 the Formosa expeditionary corps, now under the command of Colonel Jacques Duchesne, was substantially reinforced with two battalions of infantry, bringing its total strength to around 4,000 men. Meanwhile, drafts from the Hunan Army and Anhui Army had brought the strength of Liu Mingchuan's defending army to around 25,000 men. Although severely outnumbered, the French captured a number of minor Chinese positions to the southeast of Keelung at the end of January 1885, but were forced to halt offensive operations in February due to incessant rain.

The blockade succeeded in part because the northern Beiyang Fleet, commanded by Li Hongzhang, denied help to the southern Nanyang Fleet. No Beiyang ships were sent to battle the French. This led the Navy to fail. The most advanced ships were reserved for the northern Chinese fleet by Li Hongzhang, he did not even "consider" using this well equipped fleet to attack the French, since he wanted to make sure it was always under his command. China's north and south had rivalries and the government was split into different parties. China did not have a single admiralty in command of the navy and the northern and southern fleets refused to cooperate, guaranteeing French control of the seas during the war. Tianjin's northern naval academy also drained southern China of potential sailors, since they enlisted in northern China instead.

==== Shipu Bay, Zhenhai Bay and the rice blockade ====
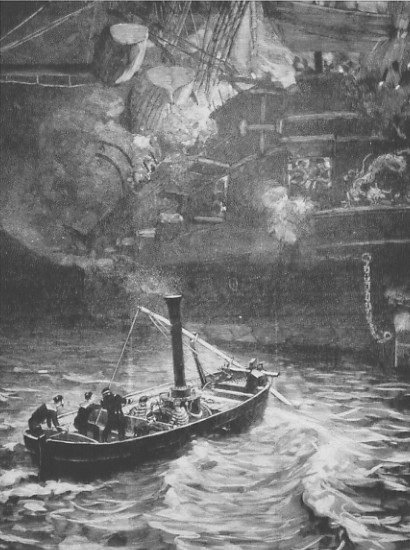
French torpedo launch attacking the Chinese frigate Yuyuan, 14 February 1885.

Although the Formosa expeditionary corps remained confined in Keelung, the French scored important successes elsewhere in the spring of 1885. Courbet's squadron had been reinforced substantially since the start of the war, and he now had considerably more ships at his disposal than in October 1884. In early February 1885 part of his squadron left Keelung to head off a threatened attempt by part of the Chinese Nanyang Fleet (Southern Seas fleet) to break the French blockade of Formosa. On 11 February Courbet's task force met the cruisers Kaiji, Nanchen and Nanrui, three of the most modern ships in the Chinese fleet, near Shipu Bay, accompanied by the frigate Yuyuan and the composite sloop Chengqing. The Chinese scattered at the French approach, and while the three cruisers successfully made their escape, the French succeeded in trapping Yuyuan and Chengqing in Shipu Bay. On the night of 14 February, in the Battle of Shipu, the French attacked the Chinese vessels with two torpedo launches. During a brief engagement inside the bay, Yuyuan was seriously damaged by torpedoes and Chengqing was hit by Yuyuan's fire. Both ships were subsequently scuttled by the Chinese. The French torpedo launches escaped almost without loss.

Courbet followed up this success on 1 March by locating Kaiji, Nanchen and Nanrui, which had taken refuge with four other Chinese warships in Zhenhai Bay, near the port of Ningbo. Courbet considered forcing the Chinese defences, but after testing its defenses finally decided to guard the entrance to the bay to keep the enemy vessels bottled up there for the duration of hostilities. A brief and inconclusive skirmish between the French cruiser Nielly and the Chinese shore batteries on 1 March enabled the Chinese general Ouyang Lijian (歐陽利見), charged with the defence of Ningbo, to claim the so-called 'Battle of Zhenhai' as a defensive victory.

In February 1885, under diplomatic pressure from China, Britain invoked the provisions of the 1870 Foreign Enlistment Act and closed Hong Kong and other ports in the Far East to French warships. The French government retaliated by ordering Courbet to implement a 'rice blockade' of the Yangzi River, hoping to bring the Qing court to terms by provoking serious rice shortages in northern China. The rice blockade severely disrupted the transport of rice by sea from Shanghai and forced the Chinese to carry it overland, but the war ended before the blockade seriously affected China's economy.

=== Operations in Tonkin ===
==== French victories in the delta ====
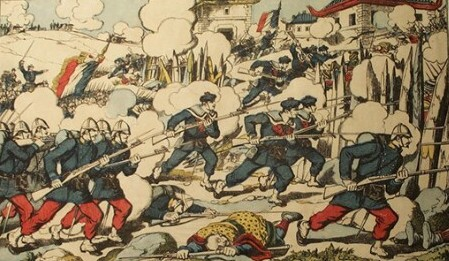
The battle of Kép, 8 October 1884

Meanwhile, the French army in Tonkin was also putting severe pressure on the Chinese forces and their Black Flag allies. General Millot, whose health was failing, resigned as general-in-chief of the Tonkin expeditionary corps in early September 1884 and was replaced by General Brière de l'Isle, the senior of his two brigade commanders. Brière de l'Isle's first task was to beat off a major Chinese invasion of the Red River Delta. In late September 1884, large detachments of the Guangxi Army advanced from Langson and probed into the Lục Nam valley, announcing their presence by ambushing the French gunboats Hache and Massue on 2 October. Brière de l'Isle responded immediately, transporting nearly 3,000 French soldiers to the Lục Nam valley aboard a flotilla of gunboats and attacking the Chinese detachments before they could concentrate. In the Kép Campaign, (2 to 15 October 1884), three French columns under the overall command of General de Négrier fell upon the separated detachments of the Guangxi Army and successively defeated them in engagements at Lam Cốt (6 October), Kép (8 October) and Chũ (10 October). The second of these battles was marked by bitter close-quarter fighting between French and Chinese troops, and de Négrier's soldiers suffered heavy casualties storming the fortified village of Kép. The exasperated victors shot or bayoneted scores of wounded Chinese soldiers after the battle, and reports of French atrocities at Kép shocked public opinion in Europe. In fact, prisoners were rarely taken by either side during the Sino-French War, and the French were equally shocked by the Chinese habit of paying a bounty for severed French heads.

In the wake of these French victories the Chinese fell back to Bắc Lệ and Đồng Sông, and de Négrier established important forward positions at Kép and Chũ, which threatened the Guangxi Army's base at Lạng Sơn. Chũ was only a few miles southwest of the Guangxi Army's advanced posts at Đồng Sông, and on 16 December a strong Chinese raiding detachment ambushed two companies of the Foreign Legion just to the east of Chũ, at Hà Hồ. The legionnaires fought their way out of the Chinese encirclement, but suffered a number of casualties and had to abandon their dead on the battlefield. De Négrier immediately brought up reinforcements and pursued the Chinese, but the raiders made good their retreat to Đồng Sông.

Shortly after the October engagements against the Guangxi Army, Brière de l'Isle took steps to resupply the western outposts of Hưng Hóa, Thái Nguyên and Tuyên Quang, which were coming under increasing threat from Liu Yongfu's Black Flags and Tang Jingsong's Yunnan Army. On 19 November, in the Battle of Yu-Oc, a column making for Tuyên Quang under the command of Duchesne was ambushed in the Yu-Oc gorge by the Black Flags but was able to fight its way through to the beleaguered post. The French also sealed off the eastern Delta from raids by Chinese guerillas based in Guangdong by occupying Tiên Yên, Đông Triều and other strategic points, and by blockading the Cantonese port of Beihai (Pak-Hoi). They also conducted sweeps along the lower course of the Red River to dislodge Annamese guerilla bands from bases close to Hanoi. These operations enabled Brière de l'Isle to concentrate the bulk of the Tonkin expeditionary corps around Chũ and Kép at the end of 1884, to advance on Lạng Sơn as soon as the word was given.

==== Lạng Sơn Campaign ====
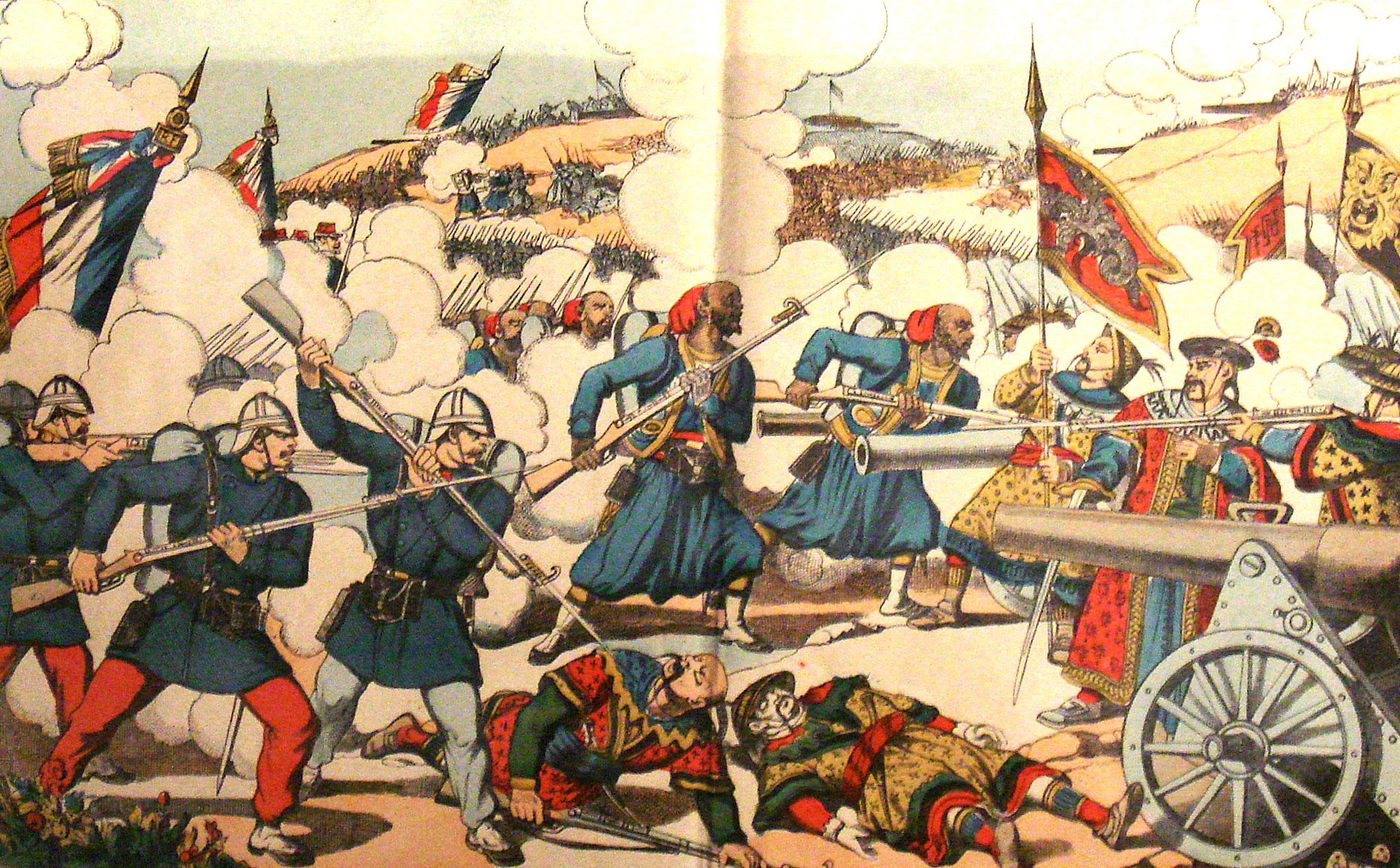
The capture of Lạng Sơn, 13 February 1885

French strategy in Tonkin was the subject of a bitter debate in the Chamber of Deputies in late December 1884. The army minister General Jean-Baptiste-Marie Campenon argued that the French should consolidate their hold on the Delta. His opponents urged an all-out offensive to throw the Chinese out of northern Tonkin. The debate culminated in Campenon's resignation and his replacement as army minister by the hawkish General Jules Louis Lewal, who immediately ordered Brière de l'Isle to capture Lạng Sơn. The campaign would be launched from the French forward base at Chũ, and on 3 and 4 January 1885 General de Négrier attacked and defeated a substantial detachment of the Guangxi Army that had concentrated around the nearby village of Núi Bop to try to disrupt the French preparations. De Nègrier's victory at Núi Bop, won at odds of just under one to ten, was regarded by his fellow-officers as the most spectacular professional triumph of his career.

It took the French a month to complete their preparations for the Lạng Sơn Campaign. Finally, on 3 February 1885, Brière de l'Isle began his advance from Chũ with a column of just under 7,200 troops, accompanied by 4,500 coolies. In ten days the column advanced to the outskirts of Lang Son. The troops were burdened with the weight of their provisions and equipment, and had to march through extremely difficult country. They also had to fight fierce actions to overrun stoutly defended Chinese positions, at Tây Hòa (4 February), Hạ Hòa (5 February) and Đồng Sông (6 February). After a brief pause for breath at Đồng Sông, the expeditionary corps pressed on towards Lạng Sơn, fighting further actions at Quao Pass (9 February), and Vy village (11 February). On 12 February, in a costly but successful battle, the Turcos and marine infantry of Colonel Laurent Giovanninelli's 1st Brigade stormed the main Chinese defences at Bắc Việt, several kilometres to the south of Lạng Sơn. On 13 February, the French column entered Lạng Sơn which the Chinese abandoned after fighting a token rearguard action at the nearby village of Kỳ Lừa.

==== Siege and relief of Tuyên Quang ====
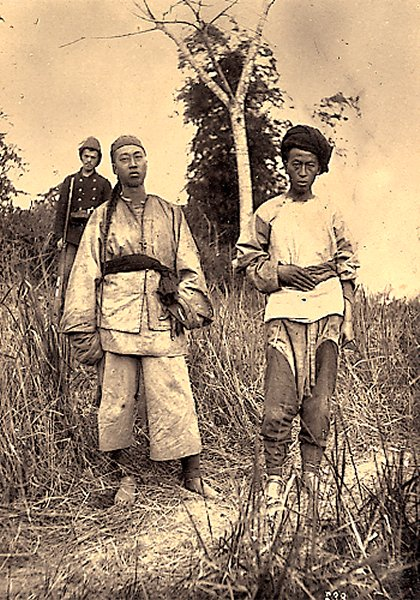
Chinese soldiers captured by the French at Tuyên Quang

The capture of Lang Son allowed substantial French forces to be diverted further west to relieve the small and isolated French garrison in Tuyên Quang, which had been placed under siege in November 1884 by Liu Yongfu's Black Flag Army and Tang Jingsong's Yunnan Army. The Siege of Tuyên Quang was the most evocative confrontation of the Sino-French War. The Chinese and Black Flags sapped methodically up to the French positions, and in January and February 1885 breached the outer defences with mines and delivered seven separate assaults on the breach. The Tuyên Quang garrison, 400 legionnaires and 200 Tonkinese auxiliaries under the command of chef de bataillon Marc-Edmond Dominé, beat off all attempts to storm their positions, but lost over a third of their strength (50 dead and 224 wounded) sustaining a heroic defence against overwhelming odds. By mid-February it was clear that Tuyên Quang would fall unless it was relieved immediately.

Leaving de Négrier at Lang Son with the 2nd Brigade, Brière de l'Isle personally led Giovanninelli's 1st Brigade back to Hanoi, and then upriver to the relief of Tuyên Quang. The brigade, reinforced at Phủ Doãn, on 24 February by a small column from Hưng Hóa under the command of Lieutenant-Colonel de Maussion, found the route to Tuyên Quang blocked by a strong Chinese defensive position at Hòa Mộc. On 2 March 1885 Giovanninelli attacked the left flank of the Chinese defensive line. The Battle of Hòa Mộc was the most fiercely fought action of the war. Two French assaults were decisively repulsed, and although the French eventually stormed the Chinese positions, they suffered very high casualties (76 dead and 408 wounded). Nevertheless, their costly victory cleared the way to Tuyên Quang. The Yunnan Army and the Black Flags raised the siege and drew off to the west, and the relieving force entered the beleaguered post on 3 March. Brière de l'Isle praised the courage of the hard-pressed garrison in a widely quoted order of the day. 'Today, you enjoy the admiration of the men who have relieved you at such heavy cost. Tomorrow, all France will applaud you!'

=== End ===
==== Bang Bo, Kỳ Lừa and the retreat from Lạng Sơn ====
Before his departure for Tuyên Quang, Brière de l'Isle ordered de Négrier to press on from Lạng Sơn towards the Chinese border and expel the battered remnants of the Guangxi Army from Tonkinese soil. After resupplying the 2nd Brigade with food and ammunition, de Négrier defeated the Guangxi Army at the Battle of Đồng Đăng on 23 February 1885 and cleared it from Tonkinese territory. For good measure, the French crossed briefly into Guangxi province and blew up the 'Gate of China', an elaborate Chinese customs building on the Tonkin-Guangxi border. They were not strong enough to exploit this victory, however, and the 2nd Brigade returned to Lạng Sơn at the end of February.

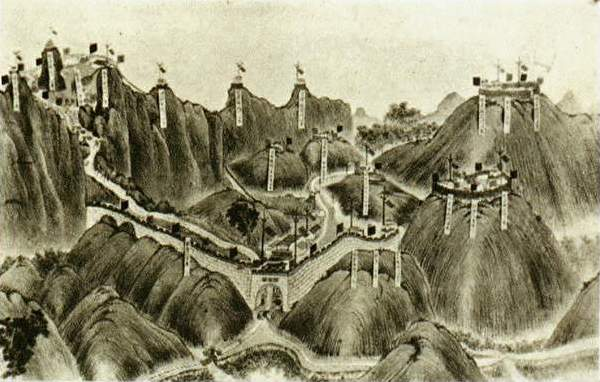
Chinese fortifications at Bang Bo

By early March, in the wake of the French victories at Hoà Mộc and Đồng Đăng, the military situation in Tonkin had reached a temporary stalemate. Giovanninelli's 1st Brigade faced Tang Qingsong's Yunnan Army around Hưng Hóa and Tuyên Quang, while de Négrier's 2nd Brigade at Lạng Sơn faced Pan Dingxin's Guangxi Army. Neither Chinese army had any realistic prospect of launching an offensive for several weeks, while the two French brigades that had jointly captured Lạng Sơn in February were not strong enough to inflict a decisive defeat on either Chinese army separately. Meanwhile, the French government was pressuring Brière de l'Isle to send the 2nd Brigade across the border into Guangxi province, in the hope that a threat to Chinese territory would force China to sue for peace. Brière de l'Isle and de Négrier examined the possibility of a campaign to capture the major Chinese military depot at Longzhou (Lung-chou, 龍州), 60 kilometres beyond the border, but on 17 March Brière de l'Isle advised the army ministry in Paris that such an operation was beyond his strength. Substantial French reinforcements reached Tonkin in the middle of March, giving Brière de l'Isle a brief opportunity to break the stalemate. He moved the bulk of the reinforcements to Hưng Hóa to reinforce the 1st Brigade, intending to attack the Yunnan Army and drive it back beyond Yen Bay. While he and Giovanninelli drew up plans for a western offensive, he ordered de Négrier to hold his positions at Lang Son.

On 23 and 24 March the 2nd Brigade, only 1,500 men strong, fought a fierce action with over 25,000 troops of the Guangxi Army entrenched near Zhennanguan on the Chinese border. The Battle of Bang Bo (named by the French from the Vietnamese pronunciation of Hengpo, a village in the centre of the Chinese position where the fighting was fiercest), is normally known as the Battle of Zhennan Pass in China. The French took a number of outworks on 23 March, but failed to take the main Chinese positions on 24 March and were fiercely counterattacked in their turn. Although the French made a fighting withdrawal and prevented the Chinese from piercing their line, casualties in the 2nd Brigade were relatively heavy (70 dead and 188 wounded) and there were ominous scenes of disorder as the defeated French regrouped after the battle. As the brigade's morale was precarious and ammunition was running short, de Négrier decided to fall back to Lạng Sơn.

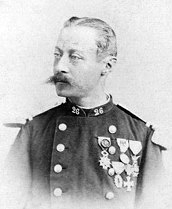
Lieutenant-Colonel Paul-Gustave Herbinger (1839–86)

The coolies abandoned the French who were already suffering supply issues. The Chinese advanced slowly in pursuit, and on 28 March de Négrier fought a battle at Kỳ Lừa in defence of Lạng Sơn. Rested, recovered and fighting behind breastworks, the French successfully held their positions and inflicted crippling casualties on the Guangxi Army. French casualties at Kỳ Lừa were 7 men killed and 38 wounded. The Chinese left 1,200 corpses on the battlefield, and a further 6,000 Chinese soldiers may have been wounded.

Towards the end of the battle de Négrier was seriously wounded in the chest while scouting the Chinese positions. He was forced to hand over command to his senior regimental commander, Lieutenant-Colonel Paul-Gustave Herbinger. Herbinger was a noted military theoretician who had won a respectable battlefield reputation during the Franco-Prussian War, but was quite out of his depth as a field commander in Tonkin. Several French officers had already commented scathingly on his performance during the Lạng Sơn campaign and at Bang Bo, where he had badly bungled an attack on the Chinese positions.

Upon assuming command of the brigade, Herbinger panicked. Despite the evidence that the Chinese had been decisively defeated and were streaming back in disarray towards the Chinese frontier, he convinced himself that they were preparing to encircle Lạng Sơn and cut his supply line. Disregarding the appalled protests of some of his officers, he ordered the 2nd Brigade to abandon Lạng Sơn on the evening of 28 March and retreat to Chũ. The retreat from Lạng Sơn was conducted without loss and with little interference from the Chinese, but Herbinger set an unnecessarily punishing pace and abandoned considerable quantities of food, ammunition and equipment. When the 2nd Brigade eventually rallied at Chũ, its soldiers were exhausted and demoralised. Meanwhile, the Chinese general Pan Dingxin (潘鼎新), informed by sympathisers in Lạng Sơn that the French were in full retreat, promptly turned his battered army around and reoccupied Lạng Sơn on 30 March. The Chinese were in no condition to pursue the French to Chũ, and contented themselves with a limited advance to Đồng Sông. The retreat was seen as a Chinese victory.

There was also bad news for the French from the western front. On 23 March, in the Battle of Phu Lam Tao, a force of Chinese regulars and Black Flags surprised and routed a French zouave battalion that had been ordered to scout positions around Hưng Hóa in preparation for Giovanninelli's projected offensive against the Yunnan Army.

==== Collapse of Ferry's government ====
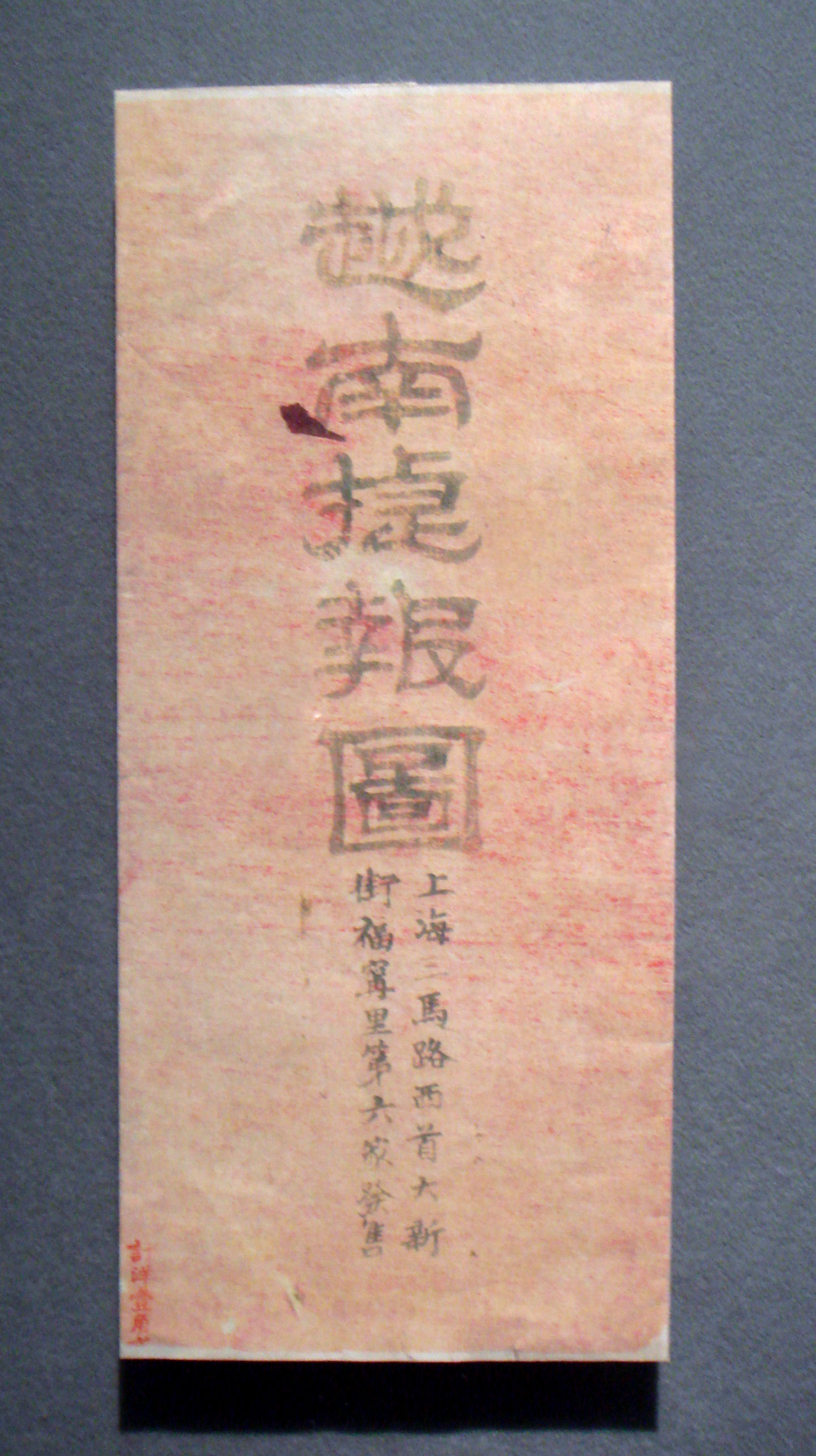
"Diagram of Report of Victory in Vietnam" (越南捷报图), contemporary Chinese report on the Sino-French War, printed in Shanghai 1883–1885.

Neither reverse was serious, but in the light of Herbinger's alarming reports Brière de l'Isle believed the situation to be much worse than it was, and sent an extremely pessimistic telegram back to Paris on the evening of 28 March. The political effect of this telegram was momentous. Ferry's immediate reaction was to reinforce the army in Tonkin, and indeed Brière de l'Isle quickly revised his estimate of the situation and advised the government that the front could soon be stabilised. However, his second thoughts came too late. When his first telegram was made public in Paris there was an uproar in the Chamber of Deputies. A motion of no confidence was tabled, and Ferry's government fell on 30 March. The 'Tonkin Affair', as this humiliating blow to French policy in Tonkin was immediately dubbed, effectively ended Ferry's distinguished career in French politics. He would never again become Premier, and his political influence during the rest of his career would be severely limited. His successor, Henri Brisson, promptly concluded peace with China. The Chinese government agreed to implement the Tientsin Accord (implicitly recognising the French protectorate over Tonkin), and the French government dropped its demand for an indemnity for the Bắc Lệ ambush. A peace protocol ending hostilities was signed on 4 April, and a substantive peace treaty was signed on 9 June at Tianjin by Li Hongzhang and the French minister Jules Patenôtre.

==== Japan and Russia's threats to attack Northern China ====
Japan had taken advantage of China's distraction with France to intrigue in the Chinese protectorate state of Korea. In December 1884 the Japanese sponsored the 'Gapsin Coup', bringing Japan and China to the brink of war. Thereafter the Qing court considered that the Japanese were a greater threat to China than the French. In January 1885 the Empress Dowager directed her ministers to seek an honourable peace with France. Secret talks between the French and Chinese were held in Paris in February and March 1885, and the fall of Ferry's ministry removed the last remaining obstacles to a peace.

Though the attempted coup was quashed in a matter of days, the issue caused a deterioration in China's relations with both Japan and Russia. Northern China was menaced by the prospect of Japan and Russia joining the war prompting China to seek a quick peace despite the successes of Chinese forces in the ground war against the French.

Throughout the war, Li Hongzhang, the Viceroy of Zhili and overall commander of the Beiyang Fleet, rejected pleas he deploy against the French, citing the Korean issue and threat of Japanese intervention. In truth, Hongzhang wanted to maintain direct control over the fleet by keeping it anchored in northern China and away from combat where it could potentially slip out of his personal control. Hongzhang's selfishness likely made significant impact on the outcome of the war as the Beiyang Fleet was the largest and best funded the four Chinese navies.

==== Final engagements ====
Ironically, while the war was being decided on the battlefields of Tonkin and in Paris, the Formosa expeditionary corps won two spectacular victories in March 1885. In a series of actions fought between 4 and 7 March, Duchesne broke the Chinese encirclement of Keelung with a flank attack delivered against the east of the Chinese line, capturing the key position of La Table and forcing the Chinese to withdraw behind the Keelung River. Duchesne's victory sparked a brief panic in Taipei, but the French were not strong enough to advance beyond their bridgehead. The Keelung Campaign now reached a point of equilibrium. The French were holding a virtually impregnable defensive perimeter around Keelung but could not exploit their success, while Liu Mingchuan's army remained in presence just beyond their advanced positions.

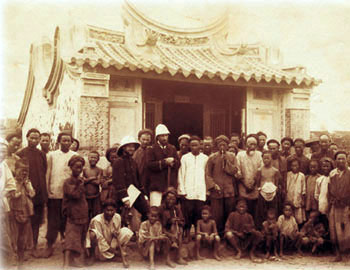
French soldiers and local townsfolk pose for the camera in front of a temple in Makung in the Pescadores Islands.

However, the French had one card left to play. Duchesne's victory enabled Courbet to detach a marine infantry battalion from the Keelung garrison to capture the Pescadores Islands in late March. Strategically, the Pescadores campaign was an important victory, which would have prevented the Chinese from further reinforcing their army in Formosa, but it came too late to affect the outcome of the war. Future French operations were cancelled on the news of Herbinger's retreat from Lạng Sơn on 28 March, and Courbet was on the point of evacuating Keelung to reinforce the Tonkin expeditionary corps, leaving only a minimum garrison at Makung in the Pescadores, when hostilities were ended in April by the conclusion of preliminaries of peace.

The news of the peace protocol of 4 April did not reach the French and Chinese forces in Tonkin for several days, and the final engagement of the Sino-French War took place on 14 April 1885 at Kép, where the French beat off a half-hearted Chinese attack on their positions. Meanwhile, Brière de l'Isle had reinforced the key French posts at Hưng Hóa and Chũ, and when hostilities ended in the third fortnight of April the French were standing firm against both the Guangxi and Yunnan armies. Although Brière de l'Isle was planning to attack the Yunnan Army at Phu Lam Tao to avenge the defeat of 23 March, many French officers doubted whether this offensive would have succeeded. At the same time, the Chinese armies had no prospect whatsoever of driving the French from Hưng Hóa or Chũ. Militarily, the war in Tonkin ended in a stalemate.

The peace protocol of 4 April required the Chinese to withdraw their armies from Tonkin, and the French continued to occupy Keelung and the Pescadores for several months after the end of hostilities, as a surety for Chinese good faith. Courbet fell seriously ill during this occupation, and on 11 June died aboard his flagship Bayard in Makung harbour. Meanwhile, the Chinese punctiliously observed the terms of the peace settlement, and by the end of June 1885 both the Yunnan and Guangxi armies had evacuated Tonkin. Liu Yongfu's Black Flag Army also withdrew from Tonkinese territory.

=== Continuation of insurgency ===
Liu Yongfu's Chinese Black Flag forces continued to harass and fight the French in Tonkin after the end of the Sino-French War.

With support from China, Vietnamese and Chinese freebooters fought against the French in Lạng Sơn in the 1890s. They were labelled "pirates" by the French. The Black Flags and Liu Yongfu in China received requests for assistance from Vietnamese anti-French forces.

Many of these insurgents took advantage of the chaos following the end of conflict and engaged in practices like the human trafficking, usually of women and children to be sold in China or opium dealing. Other insurgents were of the Can Vuong movement and fought for a Vietnam free of French rule.

French pacification of the resistance in Tonkin lasted around a decade and initially heavily relied on military force to crush insurgents. Many French officials believed the peace with China would not last and thus Tonkin had to be pacified as quickly as possible through military force to prevent a major uprising they believed would receive Chinese support. This method largely limited French rule only to the areas around its military posts and the violent repression of resistance often increased recruitment for the forces of guerilla leaders as well as promoting distrust and resentment of French authority among the local population. In the face of these challenges French authorities shifted towards a policy of increased collaboration with the Vietnamese population. French authorities sought to achieve this by lessening the brutality of counterinsurgency operations and including local elites in colonial administration. This would also include convincing the population of Tonkin that French rule was preferable to the violence and disruption of insurgency and counterinsurgency action and that French military force would be used to maintain law and order and not against the general population.

By 1896 the French deemed North Vietnam pacified as French rule had been consolidated over Tonkin and the majority of the local population came to accept the new state of affairs and insurgent forces were driven deeper into more remote areas as they lost the support of the rural population and were unable to match the military strength of the French.

== French attempts to secure an alliance with Japan ==
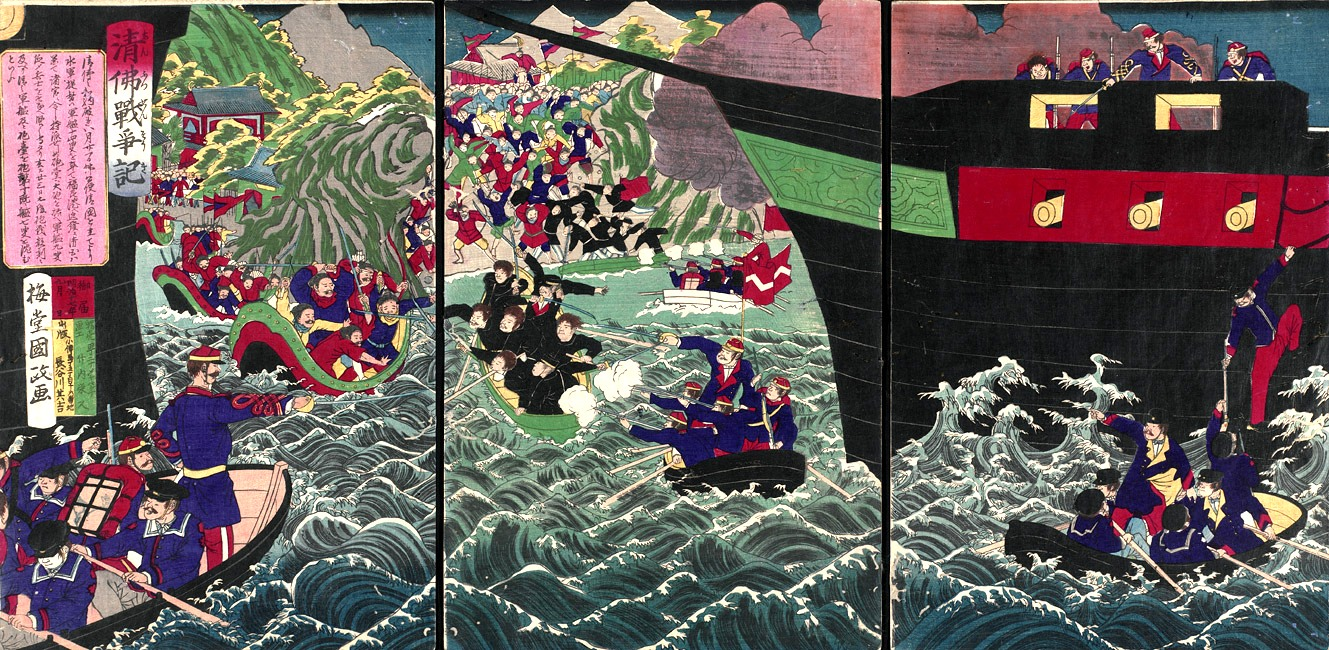
A spirited depiction of the French at the Battle of Fuzhou, by the Japanese printmaker Utagawa Kunisada III

The French were well aware of China's sensitivities regarding Japan, and as early as June 1883, in the wake of Rivière's death at Paper Bridge, began angling for an alliance with Japan to offset their precarious military position in Tonkin. The French foreign minister Paul Challemel-Lacour believed that France "ought not to disdain the support which, at an appropriate moment, the attitude of Japan would be able to supply to our actions". In order to court the Japanese government, France offered to support Japan's pleas for revision of the unequal treaties of the Bakumatsu era, which provided extra-territoriality and advantageous tariffs to foreigners. Japan welcomed the offer of French support, but was reluctant to be drawn into a military alliance. Japan was in effect quite worried of the military might China represented, at least on paper, at that time. As the situation in Annam deteriorated however, France was even more anxious to obtain Japanese help.

After French difficulties in Taiwan, new attempts at negotiating an alliance were made with the Minister General Campenon meeting with General Miura Gorō, but Gorō remained ambiguous, encouraging France to continue to support Japan's drive for Treaty revision. Hopes for an alliance were reawakened in December 1884 when a clash occurred between China and Japan in Korea, when Japan supported the Gapsin coup d'état by Kim Ok-gyun against the pro-Chinese Korean government, prompting Ferry to request the French ambassador in Japan, Joseph Adam Sienkiewicz, to approach the Japanese government with an offer. Sienkiewicz however remained extremely negative to the point of refraining from communicating Ferry's proposal. French interest faded in 1885 as the campaign in Tonkin progressed, while, on the contrary Japanese interest increased as the Japanese government and public opinion started to favour open conflict with China. The Sino-French War ended however without an alliance coming to fruition.

== Aftermath ==
=== Political situation ===
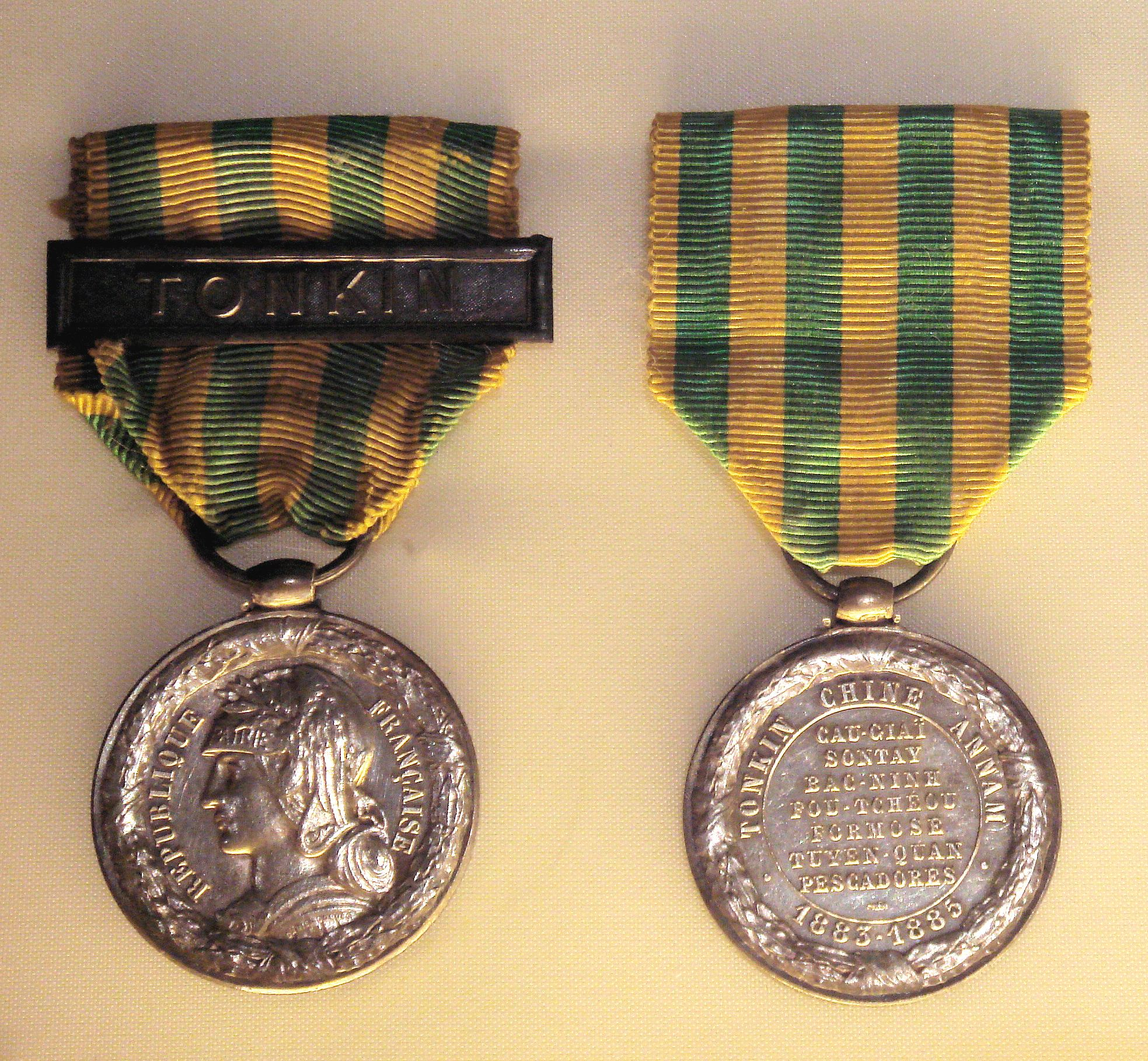
The French Tonkin commemorative medal commemorates several battles of the Sino-French War.

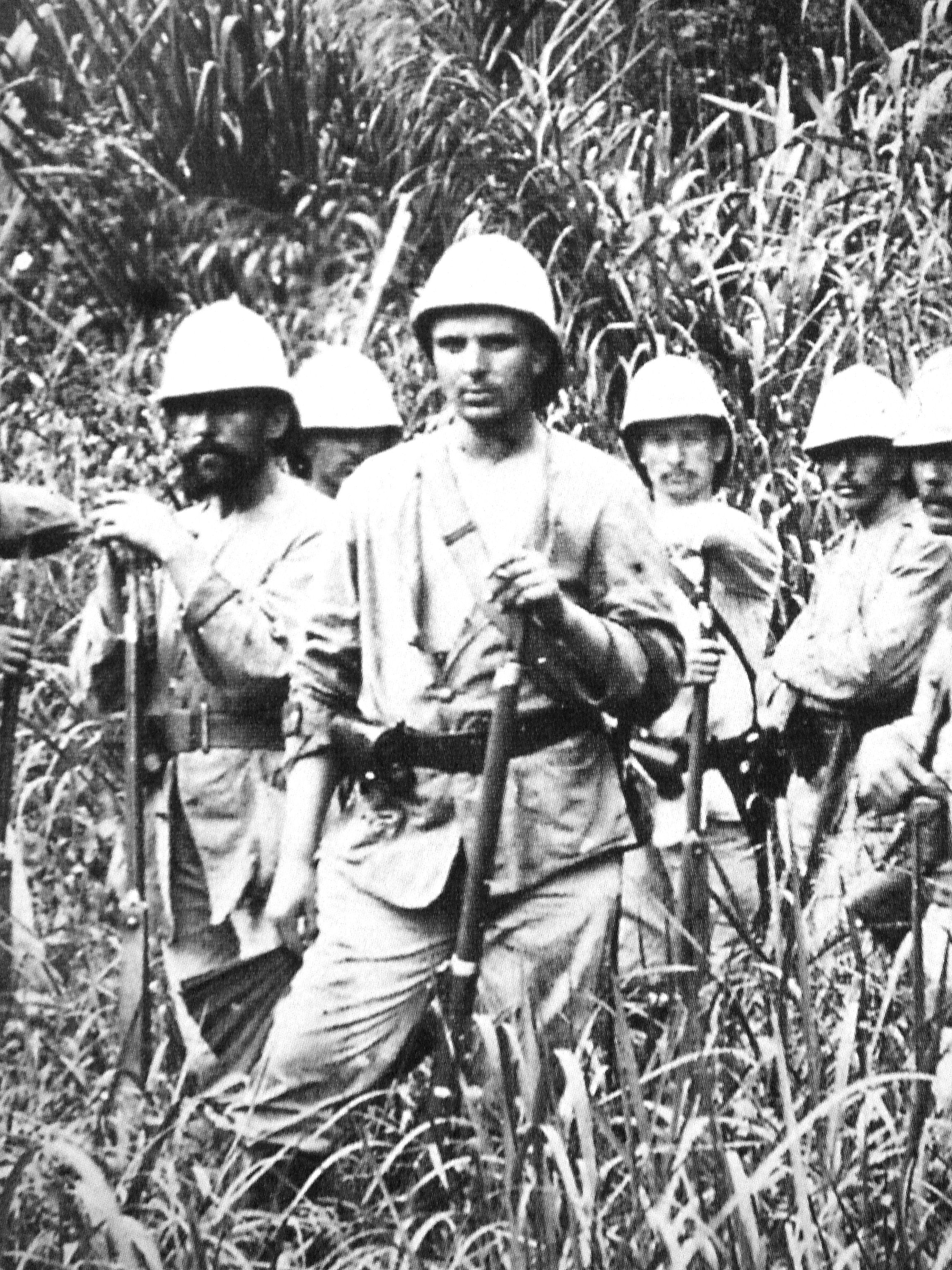
French soldiers in Tonkin, c. 1890

Li Hongzhang and Zeng Jize were key Chinese officials in the negotiations between China, France, and Vietnam. At the time, Li was the viceroy of Zhili and chief minister of Beiyang. Zeng was the Chinese ambassador to France. Li favoured a quick settlement but Zeng talked of prolonging the war. The peace treaty of June 1885 gave the French control of Annam, the contested area of Indochina. They were obliged to evacuate Formosa and the Pescadores Islands (which Courbet had wanted to retain as a French counterweight to British Hong Kong), but the Chinese withdrawal from Tonkin left the way clear for them to reoccupy Lạng Sơn and to advance up the Red River to Lào Cai on the Yunnan–Tonkin border. In the years that followed the French crushed a vigorous Vietnamese resistance movement and consolidated their hold on Annam and Tonkin. In 1887, Cochinchina, Annam and Tonkin (the territories which comprise the modern state of Vietnam) and Cambodia were incorporated into French Indochina. They were joined a few years later by Laos, ceded to France by Siam at the conclusion of the Franco-Siamese crisis of 1893. France dropped demands for an indemnity from China.

Domestically, the unsatisfactory conclusion to the Sino-French War dampened enthusiasm for colonial conquest. The war had already destroyed Ferry's career, and his successor Henri Brisson also resigned in the wake of the acrimonious 'Tonkin Debate' of December 1885, in which Clemenceau and other opponents of colonial expansion nearly succeeded in securing a French withdrawal from Tonkin. In the end, the Chamber voted the 1886 credits to support the Tonkin expeditionary corps by 274 votes to 270.

The conflict continued to erode the tributary system of China as Chinese influence in Vietnam, a region that had been under some form of Chinese influence or domination since the Han dynasty, was lost to France, a nation thousands of miles away.

Despite the significant victories of Chinese forces on land, the defeat in the conflict was perceived by many in China as a failure of the Qing's recent self-strengthening reforms. This perception of failure would cause many Chinese to look to more radical solutions to fix the country's increasing set of problems.

=== Military ===
==== Land ====
There are different interpretations for the significance of the military campaign on land. According to Bruce A. Elleman, the Chinese forces outnumbered the French, their weapons were modern, but their training was largely inferior. Although the Qing troops suffered initial losses, they also won victories (though fewer in number) and managed to push back French forces. The French withdrawal from Lang Són was seen by many as the result of panic and Qing forces captured Lang Són and its surrounding territory by early April 1885. Fighting ended on 4 April 1885 as a result of peace negotiations due to the Qing court's concerns about the economy, French naval supremacy, lack of foreign support, and northern threats posed by Russia and Japan. The call for peace seemed unbelievable to some Chinese contemporaries given the Chinese successes immediately prior. Ban Zhao, a front-line commander, reported that his subordinates begged for them to continue their attack. Many other commanders and officers in the south as well as the governor-general of Guangdong-Guangxi, Zhang Zhidong, protested the end of the war. In Taiwan, the French succeeded in occupying Keelung in the north but failed to advance any further after seven months. Henri Cordier described both Keelung and Tamsui as worthless places.

Chinese sources often condemn the final peace agreement and emphasize the Chinese successes that preceded the peace. According to Loyd Eastman, this interpretation fails to account for the overall situation of China, which had to contend with Russian and Japanese threats in the north, the critical situation in Taiwan, and weak supply lines in the south. Eastman claims that fear of conflict with Japan was the deciding factor in the Qing court's decision to sue for peace. Elleman states that although "China's forces in Tonkin achieved some notable land victories against the French," it became clear China would not receive any foreign assistance, and this forced Beijing to open negotiations. In the final treaty on 9 June 1885, China affirmed Annam's status as a French protectorate and allowed French firms to trade directly in China's southern provinces, promising to open five ports in the following years. Although no indemnity was paid, China accrued 20 million taels in debt for the war effort, and lost another 100 million taels in economic losses. As a result, Elleman deemed China to have lost the war by any modern standard.

Jane E. Elliott suggests that contemporary Chinese and foreign analysts may have been correct in finding the final peace treaty amusing as the Chinese seemed to be ascendant. Elliott notes that Western scholarly sources fail to give straightforward reasons and detailed descriptions of Chinese victories. Chinese victories were attributed to French mismanagement or misjudgement, the climate, and the difficulties of logistics. However the same problems also existed for the Chinese. In some instances, the French were only able to momentarily hold on to forts in Vietnam and Taiwan. The French succeeded in capturing Keelung in Taiwan but failed to take Tamsui for example. These mixed results may have appeared to indicate both French victory in France and French defeat in China. Elliott notes that contemporary European sources were averse to reporting French losses and glossed over mistakes made on the French side. Accounts of battles were manipulated to consistently portray the French as superior and never definitively losing, so that the Chinese never won except in instances of French error. Even recent work "perpetuates the myth that the French defeated the Chinese easily." The land campaign of the Sino-French War has been described by Chung-yam Po and Katherine Hui-yi Tseng as a French defeat and a Chinese victory.

==== Navy ====
Historians have judged the Qing dynasty's vulnerability and weakness to foreign imperialism in the 19th century to be based mainly on its maritime naval weakness, the historian Edward L. Dreyer said that "Meanwhile, new but not exactly modern Chinese armies suppressed the mid century rebellions, bluffed Russia into a peaceful settlement of disputed frontiers in Central Asia, and defeated the French forces on land in the Sino-French War (1884–85). However the defeat of the fleet, and the resulting threat to steamship traffic to Taiwan, forced China to conclude peace on unfavorable terms."

== See also ==
- France–Asia relations
