= Tây Hòa =

- Commune
- Tổng Bridge in Tây Hòa commune
- Interactive map of Tây Hòa
- Coordinates: 13.000055631020468°N 109.2385775519412°E
- Country: Vietnam
- Region: South Central Coast and Central Highlands
- Province: Đắk Lắk
- Established: 2025
- Administrative headquarters: Phú Thứ Hamlet

Area
  - Total: 55.14 km^{2} (21.29 sq mi)

Population (2025)
  - Total: 49,720
  - Density: 901/km^{2} (2,330/sq mi)

Tây Hòa is a commune in Đắk Lắk province, Vietnam.

On 16 June 2025:

- District-level administrative units throughout Vietnam ceased operations from 1 July 2025.
- The entire area and population of Phú Thứ township, Hòa Phong Commune, Hòa Tân Tây Commune, and part of Hòa Bình 1 Commune, formerly part of Tây Hòa district, Phú Yên province, were merged to form a new commune named Tây Hòa.
