= Chinese gunboat Fei Lung =

Naval gunboat of Imperial China

Fei Lung
Qing Empire
- Name: Fei Lung
- Cost: 23,300 silver taels
- Acquired: 1867
- Fate: Lost in typhoon, 1874

General characteristics
- Class & type: Gunboat
- Displacement: 450 long tons (457 t)
- Length: 154 ft (47 m)
- Installed power: 265 horsepower
- Speed: 7 kn (13 km/h) (Note: Richard Wright listed 9 kn (17 km/h) for An Lan and Chen T'ao (Wright 2000, p. 20))
- Complement: 43 (Note: Richard Wright listed a crew of 80 for An Lan and Chen T'ao (Wright 2000, p. 20))
- Armament: 1 × 70-pounder Armstrong gun (Note: A 1874 directory lists Fei Lung with only 5 guns. (The China Directory 1874) Richard Wright only listed 1 × 70-pounder Armstrong gun and 2 × RBL 20-pounder for An Lan and Chen T'ao (Wright 2000, p. 20)); 2 × 20-pounder gun; 2 × 18-pounder gun; 2 × 12-pounder gun

Fei Lung (Chinese: 飛龍; pinyin: Fēilóng; Wade–Giles: Feilung; lit. 'Flying dragon', also known as Feiloong) was an early gunboat of the Qing Dynasty.

Fei Lung, along with her sister ships An Lan and Chen T'ao (see below), were British gunboats purchased through the British Consulate in Canton by Viceroy of Liangguang Ruilin in 1867. The increase in mercantile activity in Canton had attracted pirates, and the Canton government hoped to use these vessels to curb piracy. Their hulls were composite-built, with wooden planking over an iron frame, and each was generally equipped with seven guns. They arrived at Canton between 1867 and 1868, becoming part of the Guangdong Fleet and participated in anti-piracy patrol duties near the city.

Fei Lung was purchased for the price of 23,300 silver taels and was delivered to Canton between January and February 1867. Her first Chinese commander was He Guangyao (何光堯). She was lost on 22 September 1874 during the 1874 Hong Kong typhoon off Kap Shui Mun with the loss of all 43 crew.

An Lan (Chinese: 安瀾; pinyin: Ānlán; Wade–Giles: An Lan, also known as An Nan or Aulan) and Chen T'ao (Chinese: 鎮濤; pinyin: Zhèntāo; Wade–Giles: Chen T'ao) were purchased for the price of 46,067 silver taels each. They were assembled in Hong Kong and were delivered to Canton between August and September 1868. The first Chinese commander for An Lan was Huang Tingyao (黃庭耀), while Fan Ganting (范幹挺) was the first Chinese commander of Chen T'ao. Their fates were not known.
