= Yuan Ke =

Chinese historian

Yuan Ke (袁珂) (1916–2001) was a Chinese scholar, one of the most important specialists on Chinese mythology. His first important work was Zhongguo Gudai Shenhua, a ground-breaking volume on the topic first published in 1950. A second edition, revised and substantially expanded, appeared in 1957. The book was translated to several languages, including Japanese (in 1959) and Russian (1965). Some of Yuan Ke's work was translated into English, i.e. in Dragons and Dynasties: An Introduction to Chinese Mythology by Kim Echlin and Nie Zhixiong.

== Selected bibliography ==
- Zhongguo Gudai Shenhua ("Myths in Ancient China") (1950, expanded editions in 1956, 1959, and later; expanded edition published posthumously in 2004)
- Zhongguo Shenhua Chuanshuo Cidian ("Dictionary of Chinese Myths and Legends") (1984)
- Gu Shenhua Xuanshi ("Myths of Ancient China: An Anthology with Annotations") (1979, 1996)
- Shanhaijing Jiaozhu ("The Classic of Mountains and Seas: A Collation and Connotation") (1993)
- Zhongguo Shenhua Da Cidian ("A Comprehensive Dictionary of Chinese Mythology") (1998)
