= Feilong (loitering munition) =

Chinese missile and loitering munition

The Feilong (FL; Chinese: 飞龙; lit. 'flying dragon'), also known as the Cruise Dragon or Loitering Dragon, is a series of loitering munition developed by the China North Industries Group Corporation (Norinco). The missile features various variants with different sizes, endurance, and launch methods.

== Description ==
The Feilong-5A is a small loitering munition in a quadcopter configuration. The Feilong-10A (Loitering Dragon 10A) is launched from a mortar-like launcher. The Feilong-30 can be launched from trucks, armored vehicles, and naval ships. The Feilong-60A (Loitering Dragon 60A) and the Feilong-60B (Loitering Dragon 60B) are launched from the SR-5 multiple rocket launch system; The Feilong-60A resembles a cruise missile in profile, featuring a rocket motor for propulsion, a rectangular missile body, a pair of panel wings, and four cruciform trailing edges. The Feilong-60B resembles the more common Loitering munition design, with an electro-optical seeker head for reconnaissance, four folding wings, and propellers for propulsion. The Feilong-300A is designed as an anti-radiation loitering munition targeting a range of 300 km (190 mi).

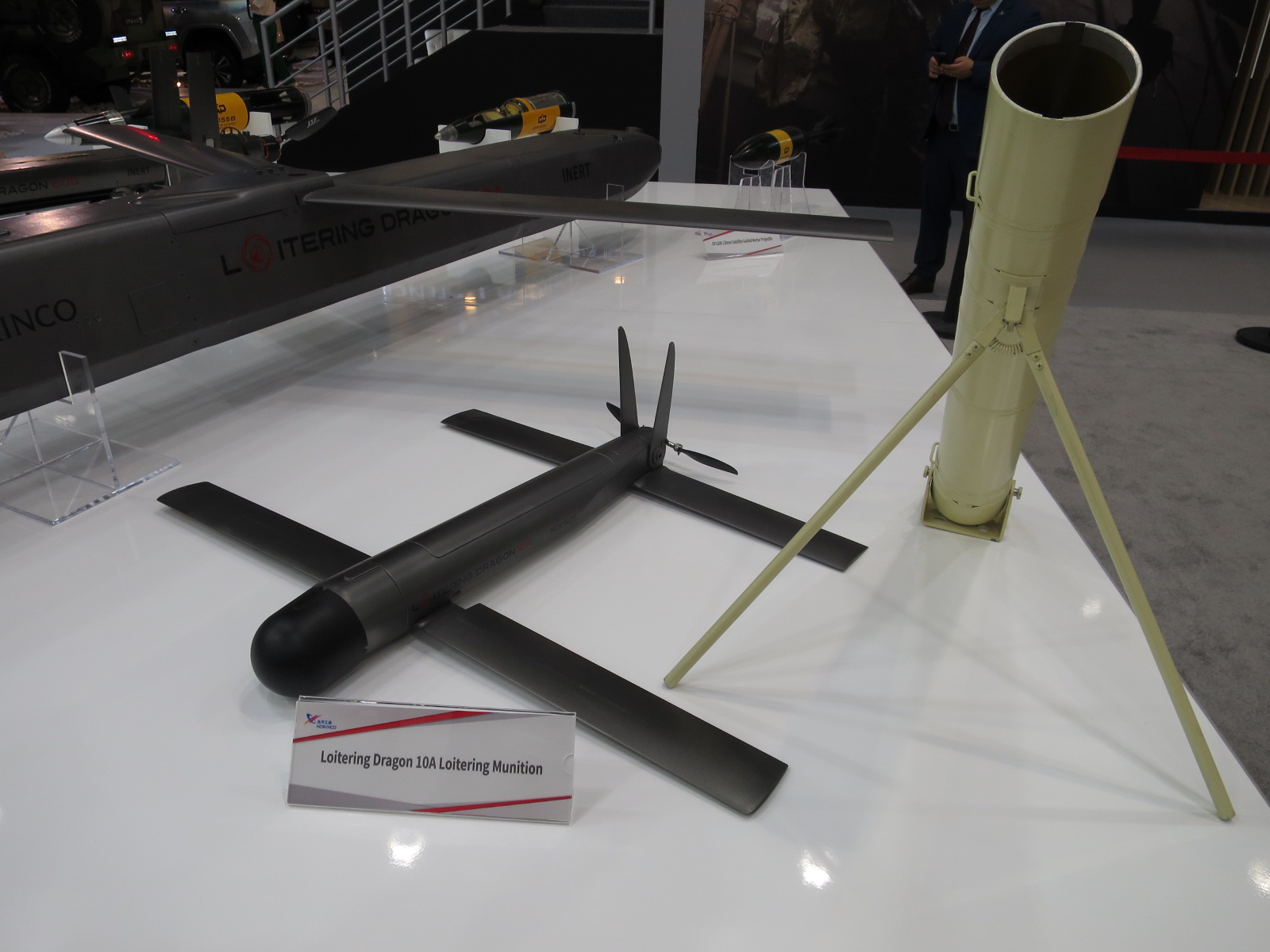
Feilong-10A

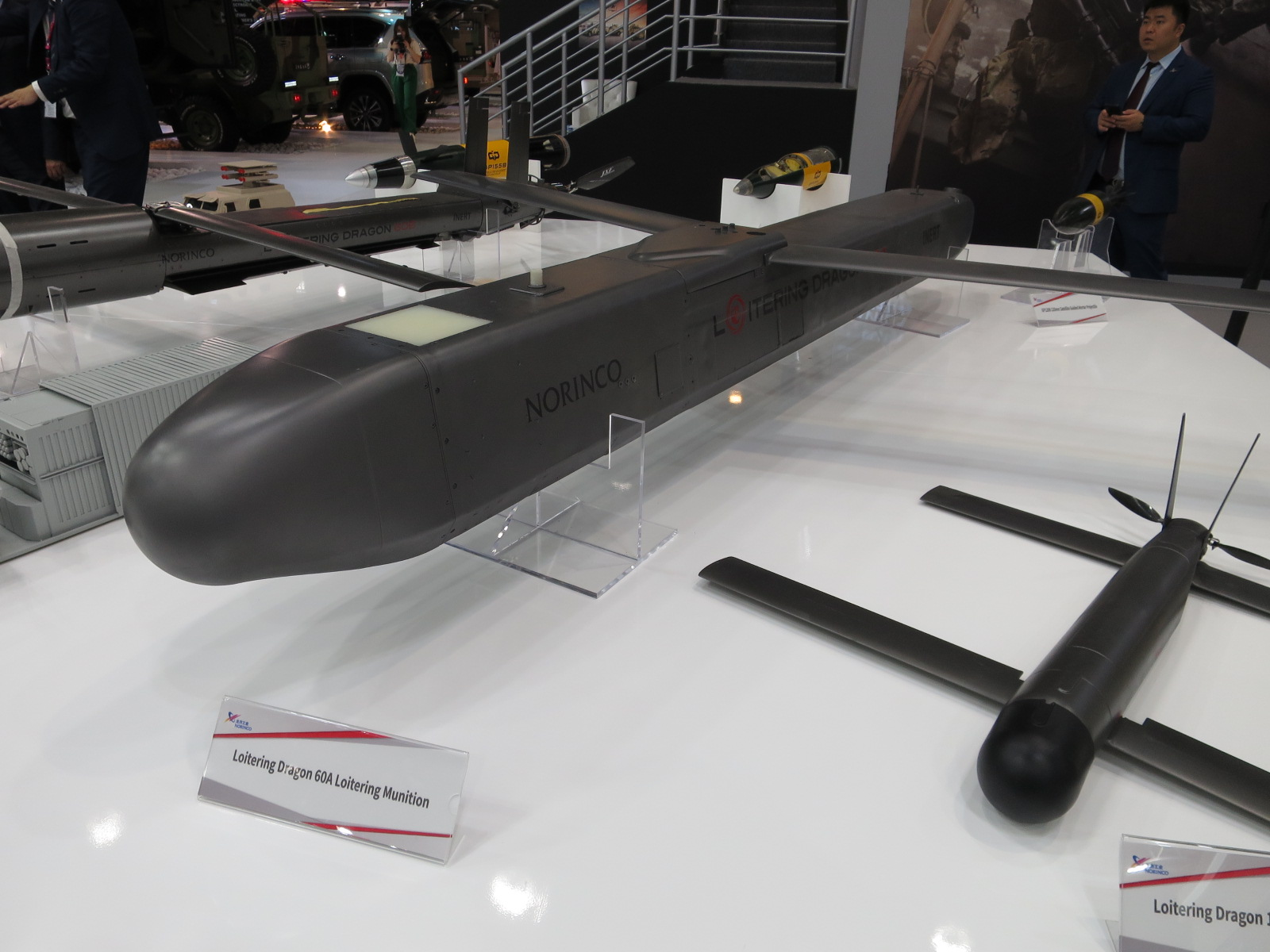
Feilong-60A

== Feilong-300 ==
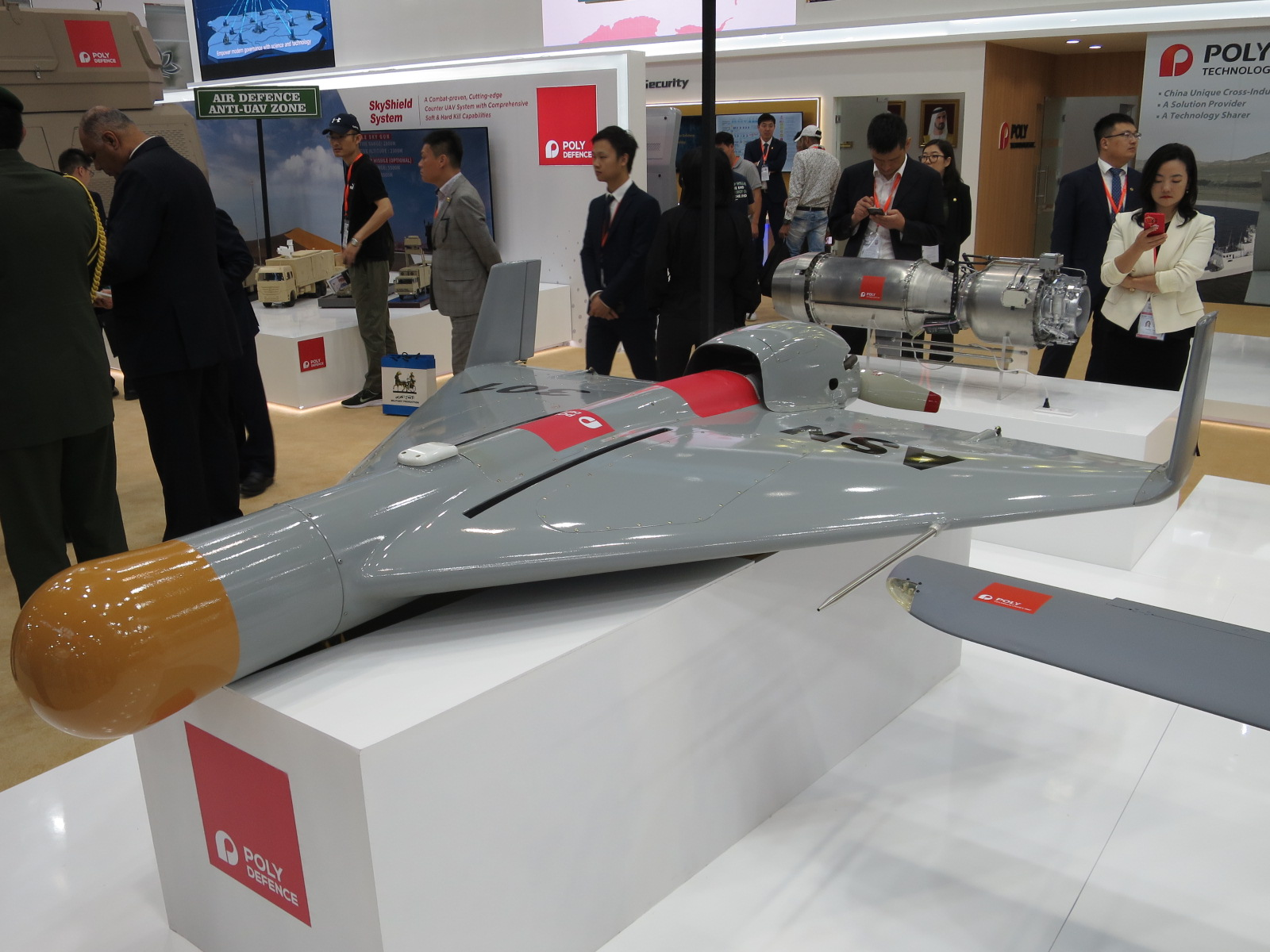
FL-300A (ASN-301) mock-up at IDEX 2023

The Feilong-300A, also called ASN-301, is a low-cost anti-radiation loitering munition designed for Suppression of Enemy Air Defenses (SEAD) missions. It features a delta-wing configuration modeled after the IAI Harpy drone, which China purchased in the 1990s. Originally, Israel planned to upgrade the Harpy bought by China in 2004, but the deal was canceled after the United States' intervention, eventually leading to China reverse-engineering the drone. It's fitted with an anti-radiation seeker for hunting radars and a laser proximity fuse for dispensing 7,000 preformed fragments. The drone has a weight of 135–200 kg (298–441 lb), a range of 280–300 km (170–190 mi), and a loitering duration of 4 hours. The ASN-301 was publicly unveiled in 2017.

Another variant, called Feilong-300D, reportedly has a range of 1,000 km (620 mi).

== See also ==
- CASC CH-901
- HESA Shahed 136
