= Guangdong Fleet =

- Ensign of Guangdong Fleet
- Active: 1875–1912
- Country: Qing Dynasty
- Allegiance: Emperor of China
- Branch: Imperial Chinese Navy
- Type: Navy
- Garrison/HQ: Canton
- Engagements: Sino-French War; First Sino-Japanese War

The Guangdong Fleet (Chinese: 廣東水師) was the smallest of Qing China's four regional fleets during the second half of the nineteenth century. The fleet played virtually no part in the Sino-French War, but several of its ships were involved in the First Sino-Japanese War.

== Leadership ==
In the summer of 1882, when China began to challenge French expansion in Tonkin, the Guangdong Fleet was commanded by Wu Quanmei (吳全美).

== Composition ==
The composition of the Guangdong Fleet during the 1870s and early 1880s is difficult to establish. British sources record about fifteen small war vessels built and stationed at Canton between 1865 and 1885, and the fleet also contained at least seven vessels purchased from overseas.

Seven steamers built in Britain or France were purchased in 1867 and 1868 by Jui Lin (瑞麟), the governor-general of the Two Guangs, for use against pirates. Although the identity of these vessels is not entirely certain, they seem to have included the wooden steamships Feilong (飛龍), Tianjin (天津), Zhenhai (鎮海), Anlan (安瀾) and Zhentao (鎮濤), and the composite gunboats Guangdong (廣東) and Shandong (山東), completed at Dumbarton in 1868. Feilong was lost in a typhoon in 1874, and Zhenhai was condemned in the same year.

Several British gunboats of the Dapper/Gleaner/Albacore class, which had served in the Second Opium War, were sold off by the British in the late 1860s, and two of them seem to have been acquired by the Guangdong Fleet. One of them was probably Suiqing (綏靖, normally spelled Sui-ching or Sui-tsing), described as a former British gunboat. Suiqing was lost at sea in 1886.

Other vessels known to have served in Guangdong waters include the flatiron gunboat Haichangqing (海長清), completed at the Canton Dockyard in June 1877. Her machinery was taken from the steamer Zhenhai, condemned in 1874.

In 1881 the Guangdong fleet took delivery of Zhenhai (鎮海), a 440-ton steel Rendel gunboat built by Armstrong and Company along with six gunboats of similar design ordered by Li Hongzhang's Beiyang Fleet. She seems to have had the same name as the steamer Zhenhai, condemned in 1874.

Five composite 150-ton gunboats were completed at the Canton Dockyard in 1881 for the Guangdong fleet: Jing'an (靖安), Henghai (橫海), Xiangyun (祥云), Xuanwei (宣威) and Yangwu (揚武). These vessels appear to have had a speed of around 6 knots. Jing'an was armed with 12 Armstrong cannon and two Gatling guns. The armament of the other four gunboats is not certain.

In the wake of the seizure of the citadel of Hanoi in April 1882 by Henri Rivière, the Qing government decided to send a message to France that China viewed French colonial expansion in Tonkin with concern. In May 1882 the Guangdong Fleet was ordered to patrol the seas around Hainan Island and the Gulf of Tonkin in order to 'show the flag'. In a letter concerning this deployment to the Zongli Yamen, the Guangdong authorities mentioned that the only reasonably large ships in the Guangdong Fleet at that period were Haijing (海鏡), Qinghai (清海) and Dongyong (東雍).

Two ships of the Fujian Fleet, Feiyun and Ji'an, were seconded to the Guangdong Fleet at about this time. They remained in service with the Guangdong Fleet until August 1884. In response to the appeals for help of the Fujian military commissioner Zhang Peilun, they were sent back to Fuzhou on the eve of the Sino-French War, where they were destroyed along with seven other ships of the Fujian Fleet in the Battle of Fuzhou (23 August 1884).

== The Sino-French War ==
Given Guangdong's proximity to Tonkin (northern Vietnam), where the main clashes in the Sino-French War took place, the Guangdong Fleet might have been expected to play a prominent part in the war. In fact it remained in harbour throughout the nine-month war. In March 1885 French warships imposed a blockade of the Cantonese port of Pak-hoi. No attempt was made by the Guangdong Fleet to break this blockade.

== Acquisitions, 1885–94 ==
The Guangdong Fleet grew significantly during the second half of the 1880s, acquiring a force of gunboats and other ships. Some of these ships were built in China, either at the Canton Dockyard or the Foochow Navy Yard, while others were purchased from Germany. The locally-built warships normally contained the character guang (廣, for Guangdong) in their names.

The first additions to the fleet were the gunboats Guangheng, Guangli, Guangyuan and Guangzhen. These shallow draft gunboats, built at the Whampoa dockyard, were designed to guard the approaches to Canton.

Two 64-ton first class steam torpedo boats, Leihu (雷虎) and Leilong (雷龍), were completed for the Guangdong Fleet at the Vulcan works at Stettin in 1884, but their delivery to China was delayed for a year because of the outbreak of the Sino-French War. They arrived in Canton in late 1885.

Nine 26-ton second class torpedo boats were completed for the Guangdong Fleet at the Schichau works in Germany in 1885 and arrived in China in 1886. Like their larger predecessors built at the Vulcan works in Stettin, they all contained the character lei (雷, thunder) in their names: Leidui (雷兑), Leiqian (雷乾), Leikan (雷坎), Leikun (雷坤), Leili (雷離), Leigen (雷艮), Leixun (雷巽), Leizhen (雷震) and Leizhong (雷中).

One composite cruiser and three steel torpedo boats were built at the Foochow Navy Yard for the Guangdong Fleet between 1887 and 1892, named respectively Guangjia, Guangyi, Guangbing and Guangding ('Guangdong A, B, C and D').

The Foochow Navy Yard also supplied the Guangdong Fleet with four shallow-draught wooden gunboats at about the same period: Guanggeng, Guangxing, Guangzhen and Guangkui. Their tonnage is variously given as 320 tons or 560 tons.

Table 1: Acquisitions by the Guangdong Fleet, 1885–94

Name (pinyin)	Name (Wade Giles)	Characters	Type	Construction	Specifications
Leihu	Lei-hu	雷虎	steam torpedo boat	1884, Stettin, Germany	64 tons, two bow torpedo tubes, 1 Hotchkiss
Leilong	Lei-lung	雷龍	steam torpedo boat	1884, Stettin, Germany	64 tons, two bow torpedo tubes, 1 Hotchkiss
Leidui	Lei-tui	雷兑	steam torpedo boat	1885, Schichau, Germany	26 tons, one bow torpedo tube
Leigan	Lei-kan	雷坎	steam torpedo boat	1885, Schichau, Germany	26 tons, one bow torpedo tube
Leiqian	Lei-ch'ien	雷乾	steam torpedo boat	1885, Schichau, Germany	26 tons, one bow torpedo tube
Leikun	Lei-k'un	雷坤	steam torpedo boat	1885, Schichau, Germany	26 tons, one bow torpedo tube
Leili	Lei-li	雷離	steam torpedo boat	1885, Schichau, Germany	26 tons, one bow torpedo tube
Leigen	Lei-gen	雷艮	steam torpedo boat	1885, Schichau, Germany	26 tons, one bow torpedo tube
Leixun	Lei-hsun	雷巽	steam torpedo boat	1885, Schichau, Germany	26 tons, one bow torpedo tube
Leizhen	Lei-chen	雷震	steam torpedo boat	1885, Schichau, Germany	26 tons, one bow torpedo tube
Leizhong	Lei-chung	雷中	steam torpedo boat	1885, Schichau, Germany	26 tons, one bow torpedo tube
Guangheng	Kuang-heng	廣亨	composite shallow-draft gunboat	1886, Canton	300 tons, one 5.9-in Krupp breechloader, one 3.5-in Krupp breechloader, 3 Nordenfeldts
Guangli	Kuang-li	廣利	composite shallow-draft gunboat	1886, Canton	300 tons, one 5.9-in Krupp breechloader, one 3.5-in Krupp breechloader, 3 Nordenfeldts
Guangyuan	Kuang-yuan	廣元	composite shallow-draft gunboat	1886, Canton	300 tons, one 5.9-in Krupp breechloader, one 3.5-in Krupp breechloader, 3 Nordenfeldts
Guangzhen	Kuang-chen	廣貞	composite shallow-draft gunboat	1886, Canton	300 tons, one 5.9-in Krupp breechloader, one 3.5-in Krupp breechloader, 3 Nordenfeldts
Guanggeng	Kuang-keng	廣庚	wooden gunboat	c.1887, Foochow Navy Yard	320 tons, two 4.7-in guns, one 3.9-in gun, 2 Hotchkiss
Guangxing	Kuang-hsing	廣興	wooden gunboat	c.1887, Foochow Navy Yard	320 tons, two 4.7-in guns, one 3.9-in gun, 2 Hotchkiss
Guangzhen	Kuang-chen	廣鎮	wooden gunboat	c.1887, Foochow Navy Yard	320 tons, two 4.7-in guns, one 3.9-in gun, 2 Hotchkiss
Guangkui	Kuang-k'uei	廣癸	wooden gunboat	c.1887, Foochow Navy Yard	320 tons, two 4.7-in guns, one 3.9-in gun, 2 Hotchkiss
Guangjia	Kuang-chia	廣甲	composite cruiser	1887, Foochow Navy Yard	1,296 tons, 15 knots, one 5.9-in Krupp breechloader, four 4.7-in Krupp breechloaders
Guangyi	Kuang-i	廣乙	steel torpedo gunboat	1892, Foochow Navy Yard	1,000 tons, three 4.7-in Krupp quickfirers
Guangbing	Kuang-ping	廣丙	steel torpedo gunboat	1892, Foochow Navy Yard	1,000 tons, three 4.7-in Krupp quickfirers
Guangding	Kuang-ting	廣丁	steel torpedo gunboat	1892, Foochow Navy Yard	1,000 tons, three 4.7-in Krupp quickfirers

== Ships of the Guangdong Fleet ==
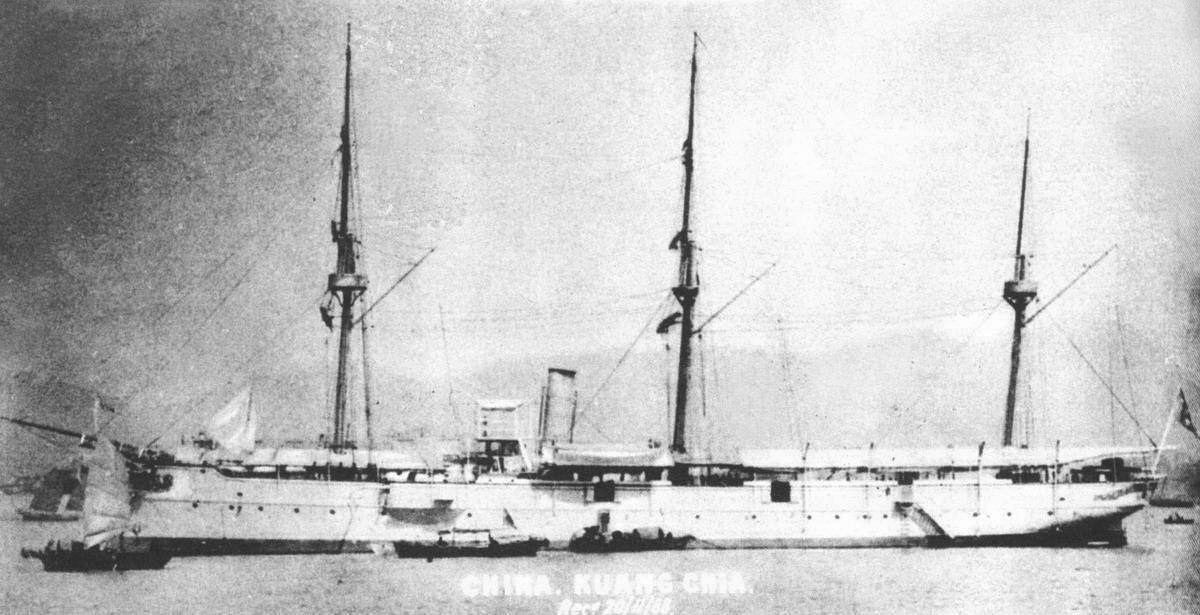
Guangjia (廣甲)

Guangbing (廣丙)

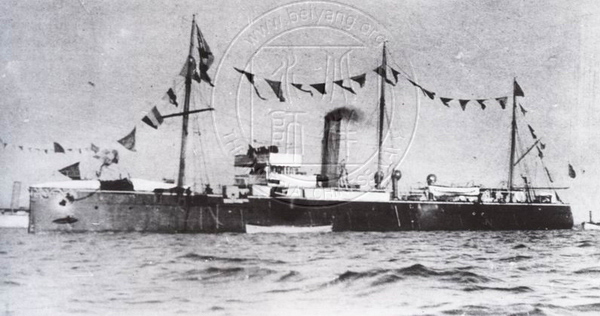
Guangyi (廣乙)
