= Chinese transport Fu Po =

Chinese lead ship of Fu Po-class

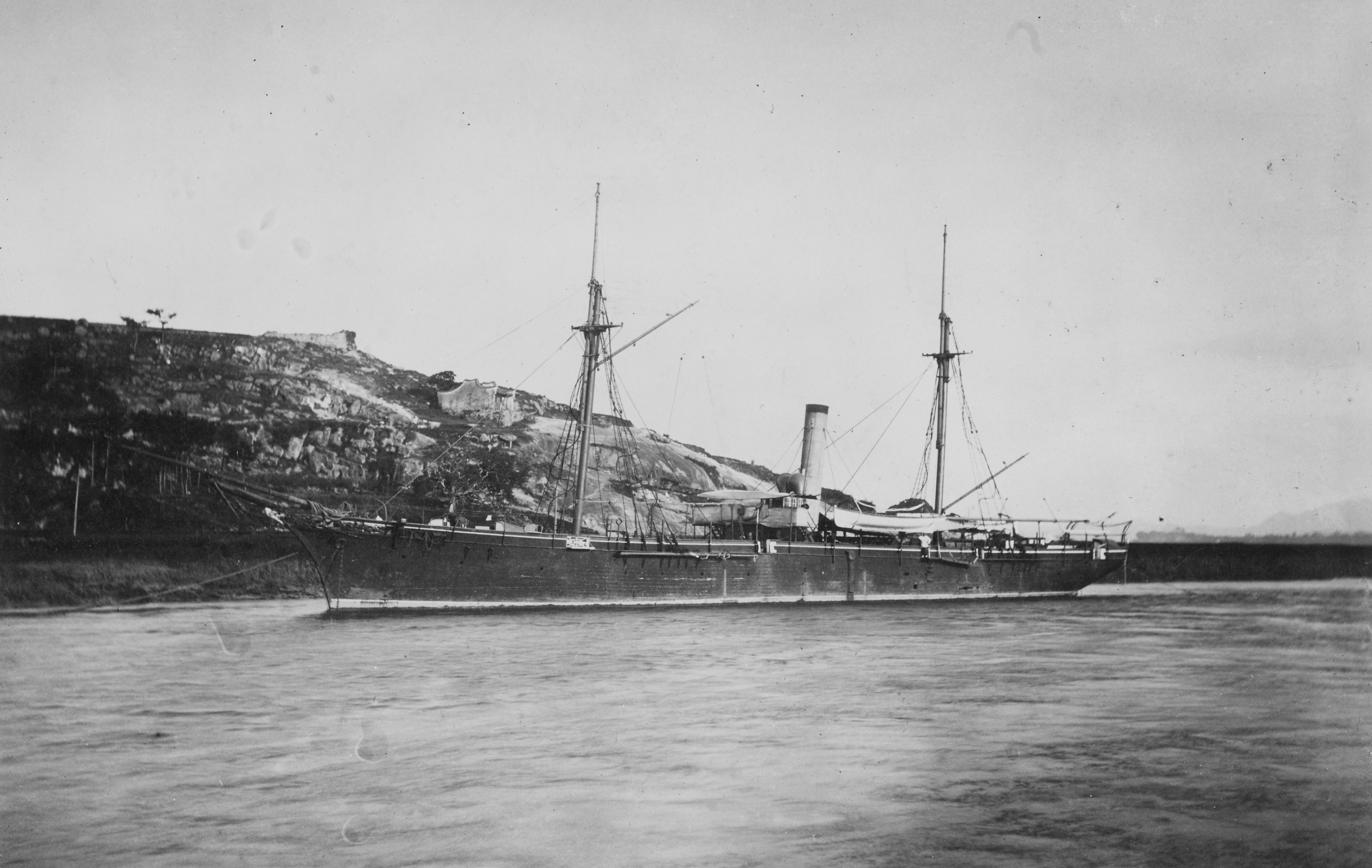
- The Chinese transport Fu Po, on station in China

History

Imperial China
- Name: Fu Po
- Builder: Foochow Arsenal
- Launched: 22 December 1870
- Fate: Unknown

General characteristics
- Type: Armed wooden transport
- Displacement: 1,258 long tons (1,278 t)
- Length: 200 ft (61.0 m)
- Beam: 32.8 ft (10.0 m)
- Draught: 11.5 ft (3.5 m)
- Propulsion: 1 × Compound-expansion steam engines, single shaft
- Speed: 11 knots (20 km/h; 13 mph)
- Complement: 100
- Armament: 1 x 16 cm (6.3 in) gun; 4 x 40-pounder guns

Fu Po (Chinese: 伏波; pinyin: Fu Po; Wade–Giles: Fu-p'o), was the lead ship of a class of armed transports of the Imperial Chinese Navy during the Sino-French War, where she was part of the Fujian Fleet under Zhang Peilun. She was present at the Battle of Fuzhou on 23 August 1884, the opening engagement of the Sino-French War, where the Chinese fleet was defeated by the French Far East Squadron. She was later converted to a receiving hulk, and back into an armed transport.

== Design ==
Fu Po was the lead ship of a class of six armed transports built by the Imperial Chinese Navy at the Foochow Arsenal shipyard between 1870 and 1876. They were part of the first home built Western-style navy; which consisted of wooden hulls. The shipyard was overseen by Imperial commissioner Shen Baozhen but led by staff from Western nations, who advised the Chinese to continue building wooden-hulled ships despite them being made obsolete by the construction of ironclads by those nations. Chinese officials would later blame the French, in particular Prosper Giquel, for purposely providing them with out-of-date equipment and designs.

She displaced 1,258 long tons (1,278 t) and measured 200 feet (61 m) long overall, with a beam of 32.8 ft (10.0 m) and an average draft of 11.5 ft (3.5 m). The propulsion system consisted of a 600 indicated horsepower (450 kilowatts) produced by a compound-expansion steam engine with a single shaft, enabling a cruising speed of 11 knots (20 kilometres per hour; 13 miles per hour). Upon launch, her main armament was a single 16 cm (6.3 in) gun and four 40-pounder guns. However, during her career, her armament varied: it was often supplied by the province to which she was assigned rather than by a central organization. For example, when later assigned to Formosa (now Taiwan), her armament was swapped out for six 68-pounder guns.

== Career ==
Fu Po was the fourth vessel launched from the Foochow Arsenal, on 22 December 1870. She remained based out of Foochow until 1884 as part of the Fujian Fleet under Zhang Peilun, where she was present for the Battle of Fuzhou on 23 August, the opening engagement of the Sino-French War. At the battle, the Chinese fleet were split into a northern and southern squadron opposing the French Far East Squadron under Admiral Amédée Courbet; Fu Po was part of the northern squadron with the flagship Yangwu, three other large ships, and several gunboats. Upon the opening of the battle, the French squadron targeted the northern squadron, destroying Yangwu in the opening moments. Fu Po fled the battle, steaming up river and eventually beaching herself. As a result, she was the only surviving vessel from the northern squadron.

Following the battle, she was re-floated and refitted, before being transferred to operate out of Formosa. In 1890, she was converted into a receiving hulk as accommodation for sailors awaiting assignment. In response to the threat of piracy, the request of the Viceroy of the Two Guangs, by 1893, she had been reconverted to a transport once again and operated out of several locations, including Canton (now Guangzhou).
