= Jian'an-class torpedo gunboat =

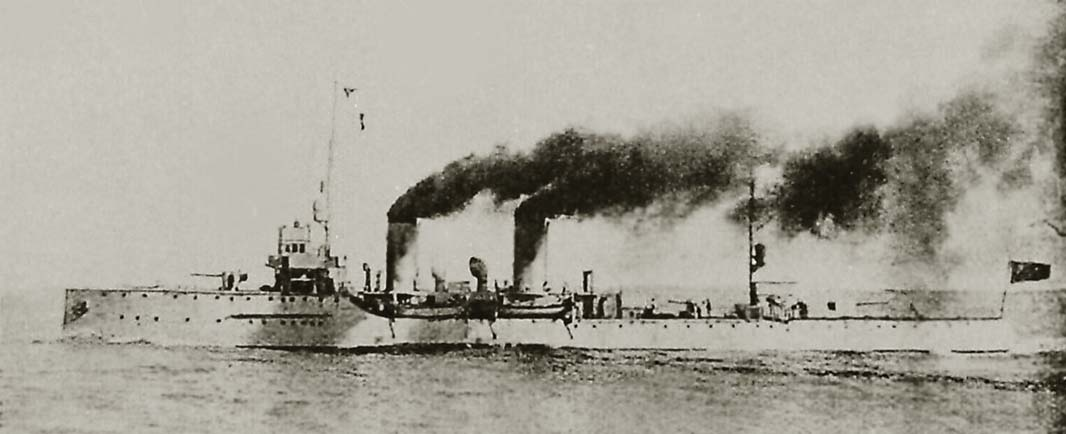
- Jianwei after her reconstruction and renamed to Datong, 1930

Class overview
- Name: Jian'an class
- Builders: Fuzhou Arsenal, Mawei, Fuzhou, Qing Empire
- Operators: Republic of China Navy; Imperial Chinese Navy; Beiyang Army
- Preceded by: Fei Ying
- Succeeded by: none
- Cost: 637,000 tael
- Built: 1899–1903
- In service: 1903–1937
- Planned: 2
- Completed: 2
- Lost: 2

General characteristics (as built)
- Type: torpedo gunboat
- Displacement: 871 long tons (885 t) (standard)
- Length: 79.2 m (259 ft 10 in) o/a
- Beam: 8.1 m (26 ft 7 in)-8.3 m (27 ft 3 in)
- Draught: 3.35 m (11 ft 0 in)
- Propulsion: 2 shafts, 2 VTE engines, 4-Normand boilers, 6,500 bhp (4,800 kW)
- Speed: 23 knots (43 km/h; 26 mph)
- Complement: 140
- Armament: 1 × 100 mm (4 in)/45 (1 × 1); 3 × 65 mm (3 in)/50 (3 × 1); 6 × 37 mm (1 in)/29 (6 × 1); 2 × 356 mm (14 in) torpedo tubes (1 × 1)
- Armour: Belt: 25 mm (0.98 in); Deck: 25 mm (0.98 in)

General characteristics (after reconstruction)
- Type: gunboat
- Displacement: 900 long tons (910 t) (deep load)
- Length: 79.2 m (259 ft 10 in)
- Beam: 3.35 m (11 ft 0 in)
- Propulsion: 2 shafts, 2 VTE engines, 4-Normand boilers, 6,000 bhp (4,500 kW)
- Speed: 20 knots (37 km/h; 23 mph)
- Complement: 150
- Armament: 2 × 120 mm (5 in)/45 (2 × 1); 1 × 76 mm (3 in)/50 (1 × 1); 2 × 57 mm (2 in)/29 (2 × 1); 1 × 20 mm (1 in)/70 (1 × 1)
- Armour: Belt: 25 mm (0.98 in); Deck: 25 mm (0.98 in)

The Jian'an class (Chinese: 建安; pinyin: Jiàn'ān; Wade–Giles: Chien An), also known as the Chien An or Jianwei/Chien Wei class were armoured torpedo gunboats built for the Imperial Chinese Navy. The class of ships consisted a pair of sister ships and served in the 1911 Revolution, World War I and the Second Sino-Japanese War.

== Background ==
The Fuzhou Arsenal (Chinese: 福州造船廠; pinyin: Fúzhōu Zàochuánchǎng; Wade–Giles: Fu-chou Tsao-ch'uan-ch'ang) was established in Mawei, Fuzhou on the Min River in 1867 by order of Viceroys Li Hongzhang and Zuo Zongtang. Two Frenchmen, Prosper Giquel and Paul d'Aiguebelle were appointed as directors, with Shen Baozhen acting as the arsenal's first imperial commissioner. This would lay the foundation for a strong French influence on the shipyard and the ships it would build. The shipyard would somewhat ironically be destroyed by a French fleet in 1884 during the Sino-French War. Thirteen years later, the Qing government attempted to rebuild and modernise the Fuzhou shipyard. In 1897 the Qing imported European (mainly French) staff under a new director, Charles Doyère for a five-year contract to revitalize the heavily damaged shipyard and resume building deep water warships, compared to the traditionally riverine focused Jiangnan Shipyard in Shanghai.

The first ships laid down by the rebuilt Fuzhou Shipyards would be the two torpedo gunboats Jian'an (Chinese: 建安; pinyin: Jiàn'ān; Wade–Giles: Chien An) and Jianwei (Chinese: 建威; pinyin: Jiànwēi; Wade–Giles: Chien Wei). The Jian'an-class ships were also referred to as torpedo boat destroyers. Construction of the ships began mid 1898 but work did not go smoothly at Fuzhou. While launched in January 1898, deliveries of material and supplies for Jianwei was held up by the turmoil of the Boxer Rebellion which lead to a delay in sea trials for the ships until 1902. Meanwhile, a poor working relation between the Chinese and Doyère led to his removal of director in, over a year after his original contract expired in 1903. This was a major blow to Fuzhou, with ship output curtailed, the restructuring plan ending in failure. Jian'an, Jianwei and a small, 275-ton gunboat, Chen Sheng, built for local use, would be the only ships of note to be built by what was once China's premier shipyard after the 1890s. The two torpedo gunboats would enter service in 1903 but would only be fully operational until 1906.

== Design ==
While designed by Charles Doyère at Fuzhou, the overall design borrowed heavily from the AG Vulcan Stettin built Fei Ying, ordered from Germany in 1895 for the Imperial Chinese Navy. Built from parts imported from France and assembled in China, the ships were of a similar tonnage and dimension to the Fei Ying, with a standard displacement of 871 long tons (885 t), an overall length of 79.2 m (259 ft 10 in) and a draught of 3.35 m (11 ft 0 in). The ships had a ram bow, a raised forecastle and poop deck, two masts and two funnels. The ships had inward sloping tumblehome hulls and overhanging sponsons, typical of French Fin de siècle naval designs. The ships machinery was also imported from France, and unlike the Fei Ying, only had four Normand boilers rather than eight, and two VTE engines, driving twin shafts. The armament of the ships was also imported from France, with a primary armament of a single 100 mm (4 in)/45 made by Schneider-Creusot, mounted on the forecastle. Secondary armament consisted of three single 65 mm (3 in)/50 cannons mounted amidship and on the poop. Torpedo armament consisted of two single 356 mm (14 in) torpedo tubes, mounted amidship.

By 1928 both ships had fallen into serious disrepair. Rather than scrapping them, the Republic of China Navy instead decided that the two ships be rebuilt at Jiangnan Shipyard. Starting on 20 January 1930 Jian'an was renamed Datong (Chinese: 大同; pinyin: Dàtóng; Wade–Giles: Ta Tung) and undertook a year long reconstruction at a cost of ¥467,200. Work on Jianwei began 20 January 1931 and re-entered service, under the new name Ziqiang (Chinese: 自強; pinyin: Zìqiáng; Wade–Giles: Tze Chiang) (also romanized as Tze Chion) six months later. The experience Jiangnan gained from rebuilding Datong led to a quicker, and cheaper rebuild of Ziqiang, costing only ¥407,346. The reconstruction program was significant, with the ship superstructure rebuilt and the armament replaced. The poop deck was removed and the freeboard reduced. The original machinery was retained, and due to its age, both the overall engine output and top speed were reduced. While the ships' armour was retained, they were rearmed with two single 120 mm (5 in)/45 Armstrong Whitworth guns, mounted fore and aft. Anti-aircraft armament was added, with the addition of a high-angle 76 mm (3 in)/50 gun and a 20 mm (1 in)/70 autocannon. The most notable change to the armament was the removal of the ships' torpedo tubes, turning the torpedo gunboats, into gunboats. The Ziqiang and Datong were re-designated into 'fast gunboats' after re-entering service.

== Service history ==
Both ships were part of the Nanyang Fleet stationed at Shanghai when the city fell to Tongmenghui forces on 3 November 1911. A few days later on 12 November, Admiral Sa Zhenbing and all remaining ships in Shanghai defected to the Republican cause. Jian'an and Jianwei joined the Yangtze squadron after the establishment of the Republic of China and were posted at Shanghai during the Northern Expedition of 1926, where they stayed neutral under admiral Yang Shuzhuang. A year later, with the ongoing conflict between the Nationalist government and Beiyang governments, an armed workers uprising erupted in Shanghai, leading to the Shanghai Commune of 1927. Both ships briefly joined the uprising, lending gunfire to local forces which eventually led to the ousting of local warlord, Sun Chuanfang from the city. Between 1931 and 1932, Jian'an and Jianwei were rebuilt and renamed to Ziqiang and Datong and assigned to the ROCN Second Squadron, on the Yangtze. Despite their recent rebuild, the performance of Ziqiang and Datong was considered unsatisfactory, and combined with their overall age, the two ships were earmarked by the ROCN to be expended as blockship in the event of a possible invasion by Japan. On 7 July 1937, a Japanese incursion into China led to the Marco Polo Bridge incident and the Second Sino-Japanese War, a full-scale invasion of China. The Chinese then activated their existing plan, Ziqiang and Datong were disarmed and sunk to block the lower entrance of the Yangtze at Jiangyin on 11 August 1937 along with eight other aging Chinese warships.

== Ships ==
Name	Builder	Laid	Launched	Completed	Notes	Fate
Jian'an (建安); Wade–Giles: Chien An	Jiangnan Shipyard	1898	3 March 1900	1906	Defected to the Shanghai uprising and incorporated into the Republic of China Navy. Rebuilt as a gunboat in 1931 and renamed to Ziqiang (自強) (Wade–Giles: Tze Chiang).	Sunk as a blockship during the Second Sino-Japanese War on 11 August 1937 at Jiangyin.
Jianwei (建威); Wade–Giles: Chien Wei	Fuzhou Shipyard	1898	29 January 1899	1906	Defected to the Shanghai uprising and incorporated into the Republic of China Navy. Rebuilt as a gunboat in 1930 and renamed to Datong (大同) (Wade–Giles: Ta Tung).	Sunk as a blockship during the Second Sino-Japanese War on 11 August 1937 at Jiangyin.

== See also ==
- D'Iberville-class cruiser - small contemporary torpedo cruisers from France with similar design and specifications
