= Spar torpedo =

Weapon consisting of a bomb at the end of a long pole attached to a boat

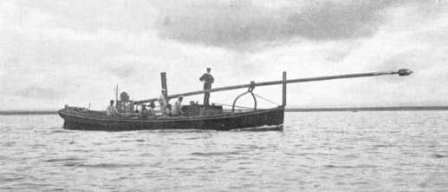
A steamboat with a spar torpedo, in transport position

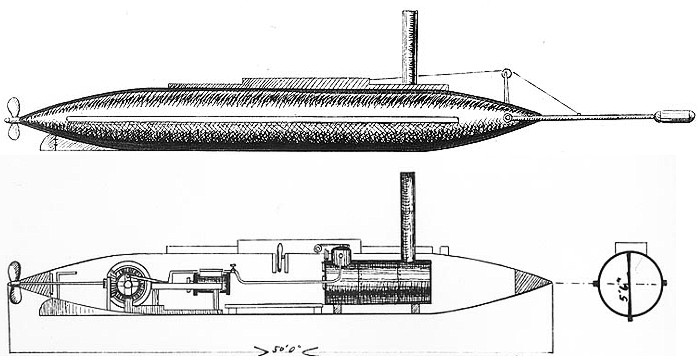
The Confederate torpedo boat CSS David showing the spar torpedo mounted to the bow

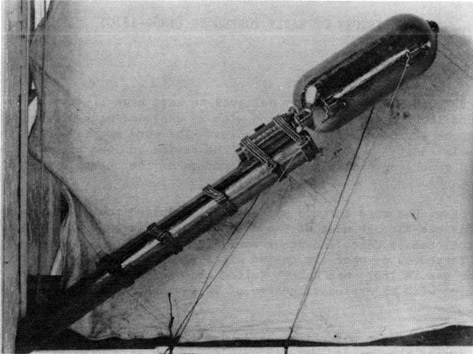
Explosive charge lashed to the boom of a spar torpedo

A spar torpedo is a weapon consisting of a bomb placed at the end of a long pole, or spar, and attached to a boat. It was used by driving the spar directly into an enemy vessel. These torpedoes often had a barbed tip so they could lodge into wooden hulls, after which a fuse would be triggered to cause the explosion.

== Invention ==
In the early 17th century, the Dutchman Cornelius Drebbel, in the employ of King James I of England, invented the spar torpedo; he attached explosives to the end of a beam affixed to one of his submarines. These were used (to little effect) during the English expeditions to La Rochelle in 1626.

Robert Fulton had written about submarine (i.e., subsurface) marine torpedoes in 1810, and experiments were conducted using spar torpedoes that year. Boats carrying spar torpedoes were used during the War of 1812.

E. C. Singer, a private engineer who worked on secret projects for the benefit of the Confederate States of America, constructed a spar torpedo during the American Civil War. His torpedo was detonated by means of a trigger mechanism adapted from a rifle lock (see flintlock mechanism for a similar device). The spring-loaded trigger was detonated by means of a long cord attached to the attacking vessel. The attacking vessel rammed its target, embedding the barbed torpedo in its hull, then backed off. When the attacker reached the limit of the trigger cord, the torpedo was detonated.

== Use ==
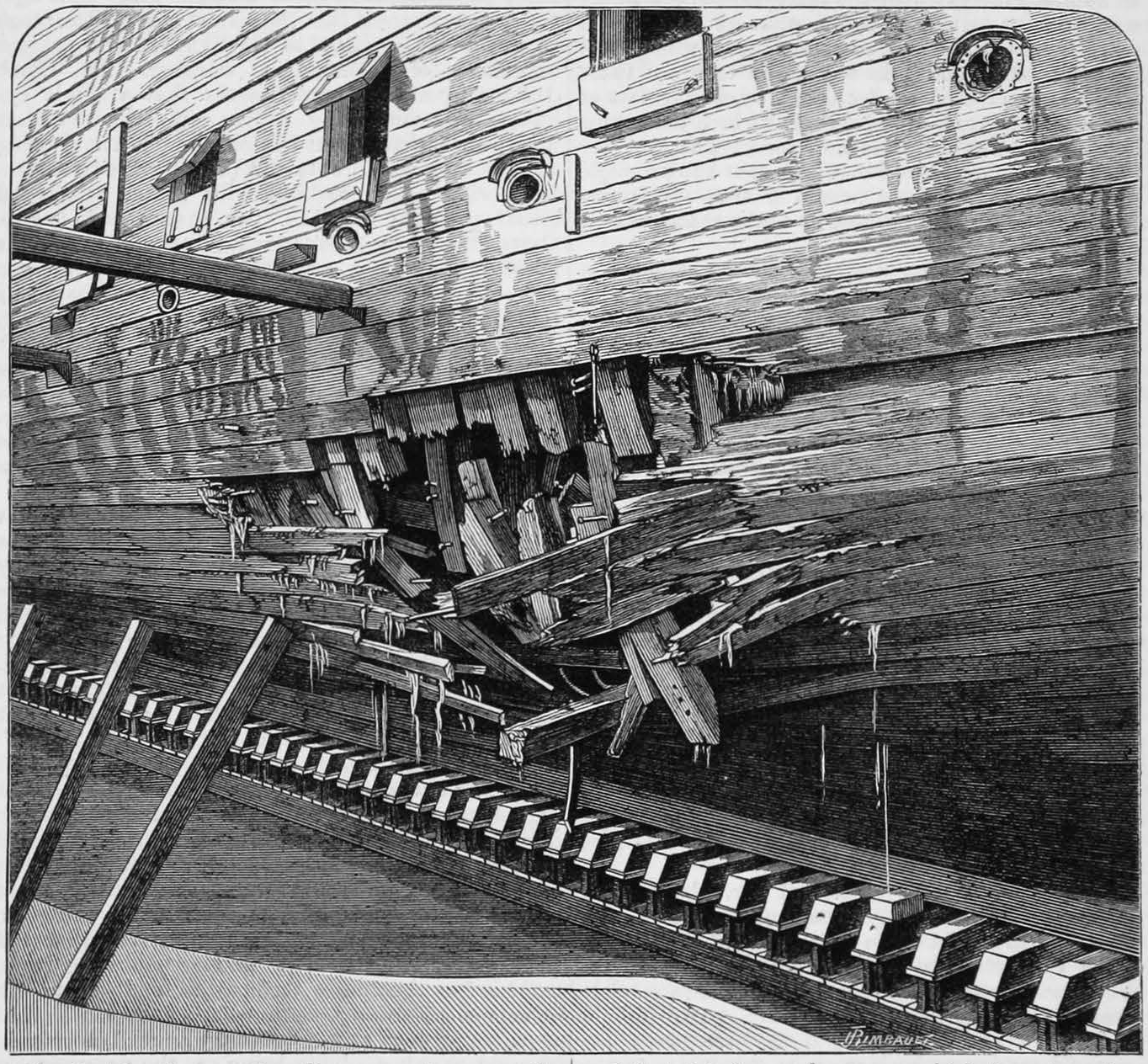
Results of a French test of a spar torpedo in 1877.

Perhaps the most famous use of spar torpedoes during the U.S. Civil War was by the Confederate submarine H. L. Hunley, which managed to sink the Union screw sloop USS Housatonic on February 17, 1864, although the Hunley was lost. Spar torpedoes were also used by the David-class of semi-submersible attack boats. In April 1864, Confederate torpedo boat CSS Squib employed a spar torpedo against USS Minnesota.

At night on October 27–28, 1864, Lieutenant William B. Cushing employed a spar torpedo to sink the Confederate ironclad ram CSS Albemarle. The sinking of the Albemarle was the Union Navy's only successful sinking of a Confederate vessel by torpedo. Lieutenant Cushing employed a spar torpedo designed by John Lay.

The semi-submersible 1864 Union craft USS Spuyten Duyvil employed a spar torpedo, but not with a barbed attachment to the target. Owing to an innovative directable and extensible spar, this craft could release a slightly buoyant mine underneath the target, which would be exploded by the means described above. (This craft was not employed against Confederate targets but was used to clear wreckage from rivers.)

Spar torpedoes were also used on small wooden launches in the late 19th century, although they were not very useful weapons. The locomotive torpedo (the contemporary term for the modern self-propelled torpedo) replaced the spar torpedo as a weapon for submarines and small boats in the 1870s.

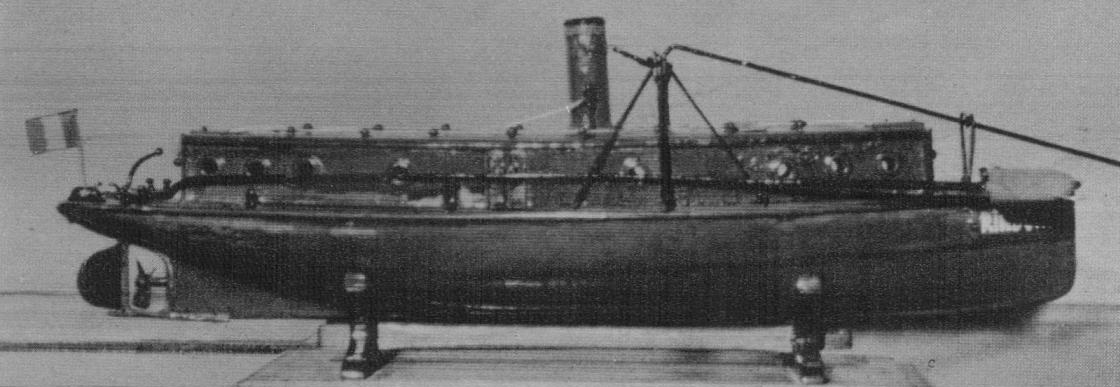
NMS Rândunica

Spar torpedoes were also used by Romanian forces during the country's war of independence. On May 26, 1877, the craft Rândunica sank the Ottoman river monitor Seyfi on the Danube.

French admiral Amédée Courbet made good use of two spar torpedo boats at the Battle of Fuzhou on August 23, 1884, which sank the flagship of the Chinese Fujian Fleet – the corvette Yangwu – and the gunboat Fuxing. It showed that spar torpedoes can be effective against ships at anchor, not protected by torpedo nets and without a proper look-out. On February 14, 1885, Courbet also sank Chinese frigate Yuyuan with two spar torpedo boats in the Battle of Shipu.

Spar torpedoes were superseded by the automotive torpedo.

== See also ==
- Ramming
- Fire ship
- Naval drones
- MTM explosive motorboat
- Shinyo (suicide motorboat)
