= Chinese gunboat Fuxing =

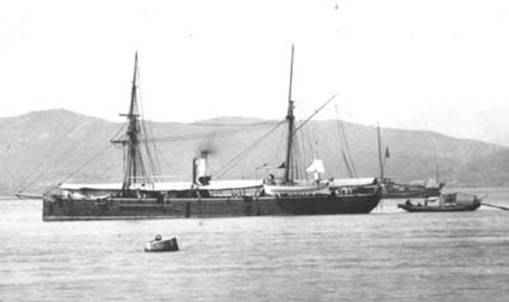
- Fuxing circa 1880

History

Imperial China
- Name: Fuxing (福星)
- Builder: Foochow Arsenal
- Launched: 30 May 1870
- Fate: Sunk 23 August 1884

General characteristics
- Type: Wooden gunboat
- Displacement: 515 long tons (523 t)
- Length: 170 ft 2 in (51.87 m)
- Beam: 19.7 ft (6.0 m)
- Draught: 9.8 ft 5 in (3.11 m)
- Installed power: 400 ihp (300 kW)
- Propulsion: Reciprocating engine, single shaft
- Speed: 8 kn (15 km/h; 9.2 mph)
- Armament: 1 × 16 cm (6.3 in) Krupp gun; 2 x 12 cm (4.7 in) Krupp guns

Fuxing (Chinese: 福星; pinyin: Fuxing; Wade–Giles: Fu-hsing) was a wooden gunboat built for the Imperial Chinese Navy. She was built in 1870 at the Foochow Arsenal, the second such Meiyun-class gunboat constructed, alongside her sister ship Meiyun. Fuxing was based throughout her life at the Foochow Arsenal, and there became involved in the Battle of Fuzhou at the opening of the Sino-French War. She was quickly sunk during the battle by a spar torpedo.

== Design ==
Fuxing was the third ship to be constructed at the Foochow Arsenal, after Meiyun and the transport Wannien Ching. All the ships of this period were constructed out of wood, mostly teak. She was 170 feet (52 metres) long overall. She had a beam of 19.7 ft (6.0 m) and a draught of 9.8 ft (3.0 m). Fuxing displaced 515 long tons (523 tonnes).

She was fully sail rigged, in addition to her single steam engine powering a single shaft. The engine had an output of 400 indicated horsepower (300 kilowatts), enabling Fuxing to travel at 8 knots (15 kilometres per hour; 9.2 miles per hour). She was armed with three Krupp guns; a single 16 cm (6.3 in) and two 12 cm (4.7 in).

== Service history ==
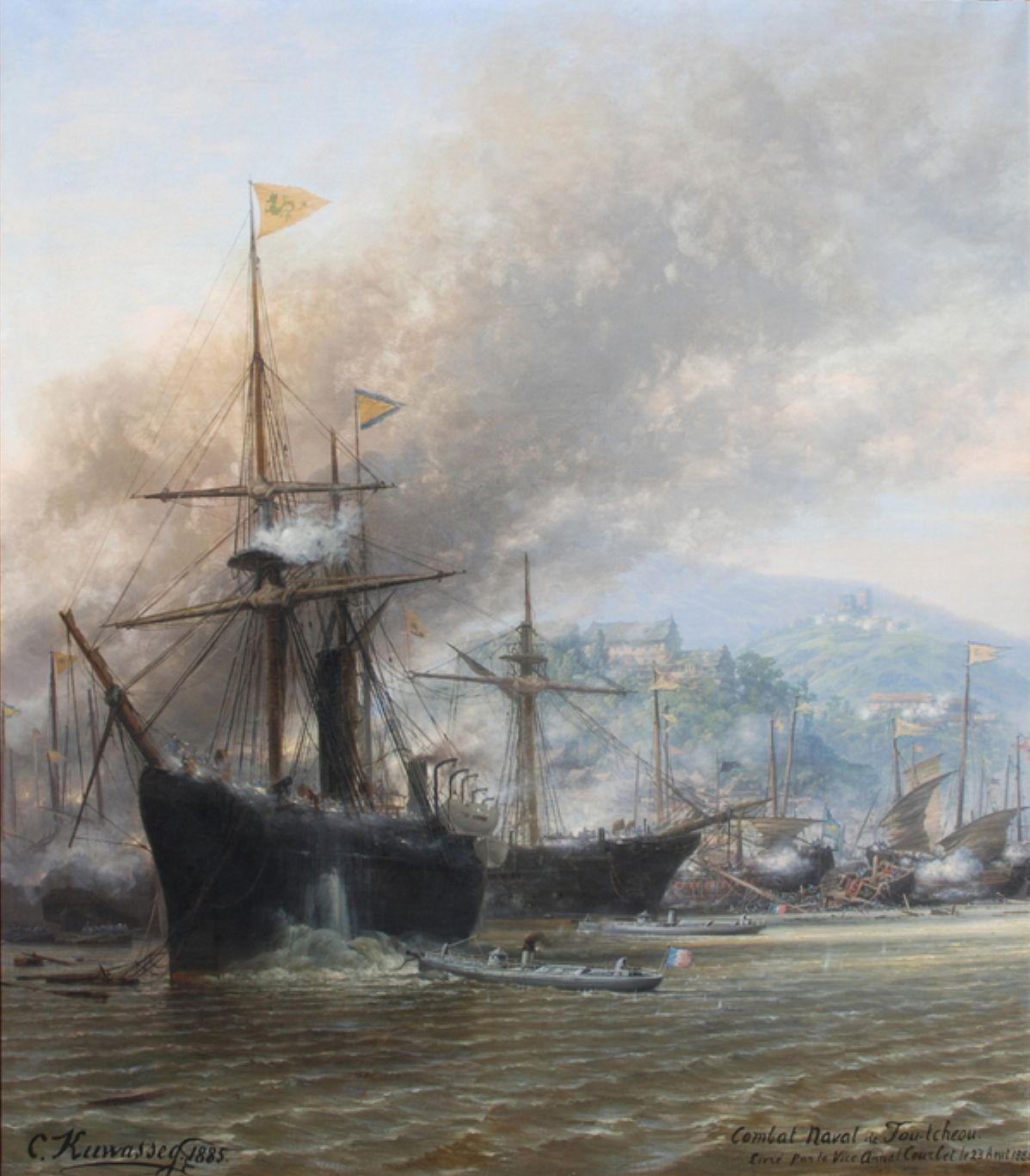
The 1885 painting Bombardment of Foutcheou by Charles Kuwasseg, showing the attack on Fuxing behind Yangwu

In July 1884, Fuxing was located at the Foochow Arsenal along with the corvette Yangwu and two flat-iron gunboats. From the middle of the month, the French Navy started sending ships nearby as the governments of France and China held negotiations in order to prevent a war. The French forces became impatient, and bombarded Formosa (now Taiwan) in early August. Despite the presence of the French navy near Foochow, more reinforcements were not sent to bolster the Chinese squadron.

Negotiations ended on 21 August, and the French squadron began clearing for action each day. On 23 August, they gave notice that an attack was imminent, but the Chinese forces took no action. Just prior to 2pm, the French attack in the Battle of Fuzhou began, which marked the start of the active phase of the Sino-French War. The Chinese flagship Yangwu was destroyed 27 seconds later, as the French had already sent forward torpedo boats equipped with spar torpedoes. While boat No 46 had impacted the Yangwu, Fuxing was damaged by a spar torpedo from boat No 45. It was later sunk by another spar torpedo, this time from a pinnace launched from the French
