= Chinese corvette Yangwu =

Imperial Chinese Navy's wooden corvette

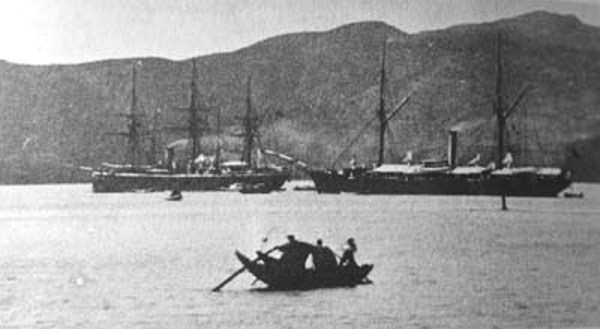
- Yangwu (pictured left) with the Chinese gunboat Fuxing at anchor, the night before the Battle of Fuzhou.

History

Imperial China
- Name: Yangwu (揚武)
- Namesake: Yangwu
- Builder: Foochow Arsenal
- Launched: April 23, 1872
- Fate: Sunk August 23, 1884

General characteristics
- Type: Corvette
- Displacement: 1,393 long tons (1,415 t)
- Length: 190 feet 2 inches (57.96 m)
- Beam: 36 feet (11 m)
- Draught: 16 feet 5 inches (5.00 m)
- Installed power: 250 hp (190 kW); 4 boilers
- Propulsion: Steam engine
- Speed: 13 knots (24 km/h; 15 mph)
- Complement: 270
- Armament: 8 × 70-pounder guns; 2 × 24-pounder long guns; 1 × 150-pounder gun

Yangwu (Chinese: 揚武; pinyin: Yangwu; Wade–Giles: Yang-wu or Yang Woo) was a wooden corvette built for the Imperial Chinese Navy. She was built in 1872 at the Foochow Arsenal, and was the largest ship built there from the shipbuilding programme of 1868–75. During her early career, she was used as a training ship and under the command of English captains. She later saw action in the Battle of Fuzhou in 1884, the opening action of the Sino-French War, where she acted as the flagship of the Fujian Fleet. Shortly after the start of the battle, she was damaged by a spar torpedo, causing a large explosion and the loss of the majority of her crew; she was sunk shortly afterwards by enemy fire.

== Design ==
Yangwu was a unique showpiece at the Foochow Arsenal. She was 190 feet 2 inches (57.96 m) long overall, had a beam of 36 feet (11 m) and an average draft of 16 feet 65 inches (6.53 m). She displaced 1,393 long tons (1,415 t). The propulsion system consisted of a 250-horsepower (190 kW) steam engine, built by John Inglis and Company, equipped with four boilers and a retractable funnel. Her engines produced a cruising speed of 13 knots (24 km/h; 15 mph).

Yangwu was armed with a battery of four 5-inch (130 mm) 70-pounder guns on each side, and two further mounted as chase guns at the bow and stern. These were each built by the British firm Armstrong's. A further 6.5-inch (170 mm) 150-pounder at amidships and two 24-pounder long guns rounded out her armament. She was equipped with two gunpowder magazines, located at fore and aft.

== Construction and career ==
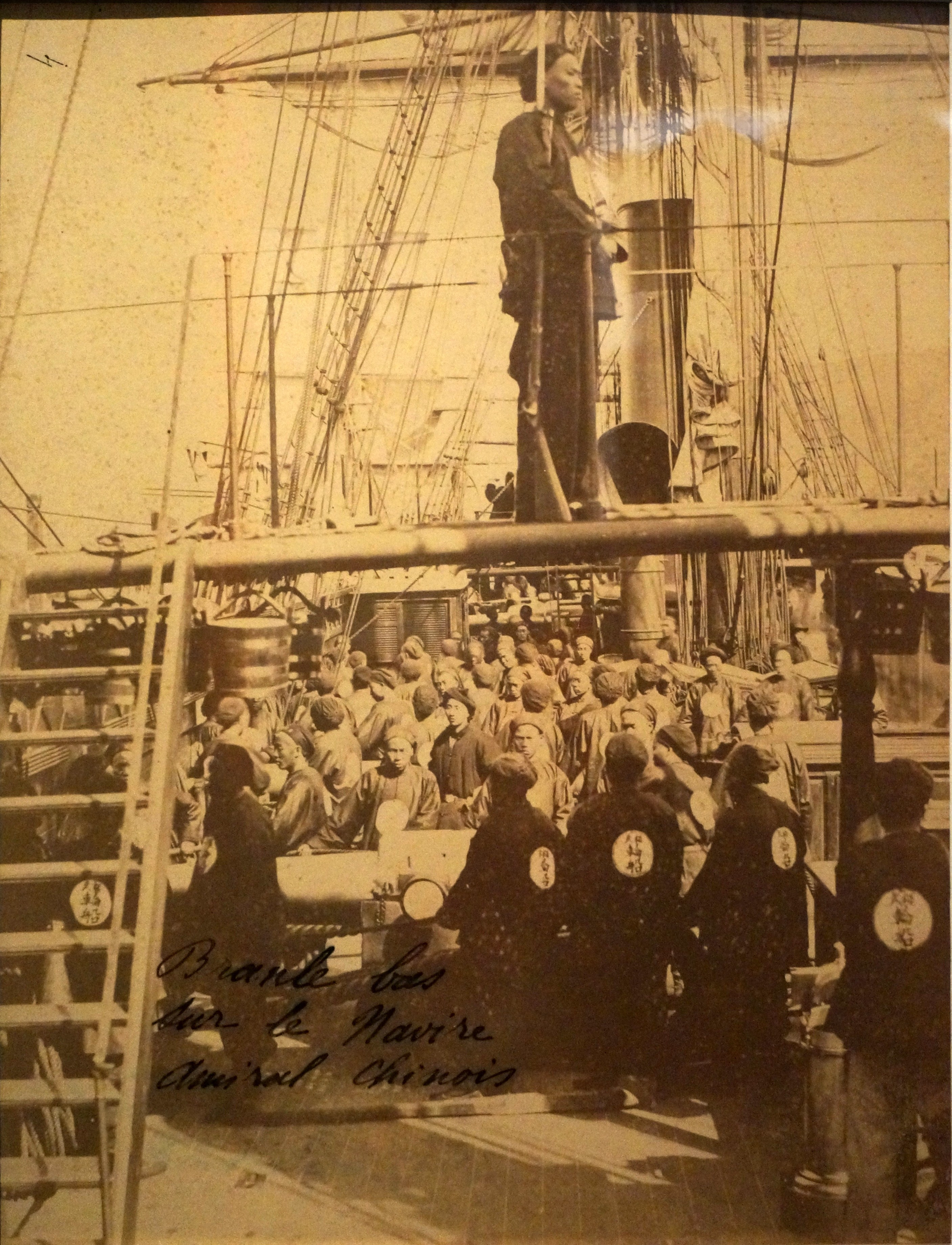
Chinese sailors on the deck of Yangwu

Yangwu was a wooden corvette, built at the Foochow Navy Yard and launched on April 23, 1872. She was the seventh vessel built as part of a larger shipbuilding program at the Foochow Arsenal, and cost 254,000 taels (353,000 silver dollars) for her construction. She was the largest warship built between 1868 and 1875 out of the 19 vessels planned. The shipyard was overseen by Imperial commissioner Shen Baozhen but led by staff from Western nations, who advised the Chinese to continue building wooden-hulled ships despite them being made obsolete by the construction of ironclads by those nations. Chinese officials would later unfairly blame the French, in particular Prosper Giquel, for purposely providing them with out-of-date equipment and designs.

After being launched in 1872, she served as a training vessel from 1875 in the South China Sea, making at least one journey to Japan. Yangwu was equipped with a classroom for the training of Chinese midshipmen and officers. At the time of a report in the Shanghai Courier in June 1876, there were 30 such sailors under tuition. She had been recently commanded by the Captain Tracey, an Englishman, but he had been recalled to the Royal Navy and promoted to Post-captain. He was replaced with his fellow countryman, Captain Luxmore. There were two further English members of the crew, both officers, while the rest were Chinese.

During the summer of 1876, Yangwu visited the Australian colonies, and later in the year the Chinese ambassadors to Great Britain, Kwoh Song Tao and Liu-Si-hung, visited Yangwu via mail steamer in December while she was in Singapore. Following the visit, she sailed to Manila. When she arrived in February 1877, an accident occurred as the crew were preparing a gun salute for her entrance to the harbour. As the crewman loaded the charge into one of the guns, it detonated, throwing him from the ship and killing him. The crewman was subsequently buried in the city. Yangwu proved to be a spectacle for the inhabitants of the city, particularly the Chinese, some of whom had sailed out to greet her arrival in small boats and others who watched her from the mound on which the lighthouse sat overlooking the bay.

On June 23, 1884, as tensions were rising between the French Empire and Imperial China, Yangwu was part of the Chinese fleet at Chefoo (now known as Yantai) which met with a French squadron comprising two cruisers and a sloop. During the course of the meeting, the French demonstrated the firepower of their cruisers, which were nearly two and a half times the size of Yangwu, which in turn was the largest of the Chinese vessels. During the demonstration, the French showed they could hit targets more than 4,000 metres (4,400 yd) away. Afterwards, Yangwu headed to the naval yard at Foochow (now Fuzhou), while the remaining Chinese ships steamed to the port of Tianjin.

=== Battle of Foochow (Fuzhou) ===
On August 9, 1884, French naval forces attacked and captured Keelung on the island of Formosa in response to Chinese involvement in the Tonkin Campaign and specifically the Bắc Lệ ambush. Shortly afterwards, the French Navy's Far East Squadron under Rear Admiral Amédée Courbet, comprising the cruisers Duguay-Trouin, Villars, and d'Estaing along with a number of smaller vessels, was sent up the Min River to attack the arsenal at Foochow. As they travelled upriver, the Chinese declared war on the French, officially marking the start of the Sino-French War.

Yangwu led the Fujian Fleet protecting Foochow under the command of Captain Chang Cheng, which otherwise comprised three sloops in addition to a variety of gunboats, transports, launches and war junks. The Royal Navy and United States Navy vessels in the port made certain to anchor a distance away from where the engagement was expected to take place. The vessels faced off for several days before the French forces made their attack, as they were awaiting reinforcement by the ironclad Triomphante. They planned to attack just before 2pm on August 23, with two torpedo boats tasked with engaging Yangwu and the gunboat Fusheng on the first signal.

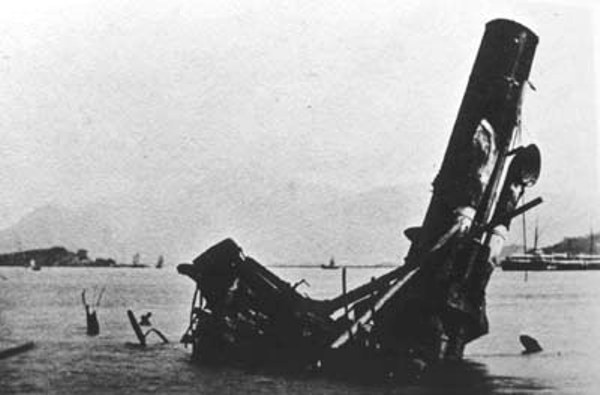
The sunken Yangwu after the Battle of Foochow

Just before 2pm on August 23, the attack began after a broadside from the gunboat Zhenwei at the French gunboat Lynx. This was the signal for the small boats to move forward, and some 27 seconds later a massive explosion erupted from Yangwu. Boat No. 46 had impacted with her spar torpedo just below the waterline amidships. The detonation was so large that only fifteen of the crew survived and it was claimed that bodies launched into the air were found on the rooftops of houses over 1 mile (1.6 km) away, although this was later considered to be an outlandish claim. The number of survivors was likewise questioned by eyewitnesses on board the screw sloop USS Enterprise, as the official report claimed that the senior officers survived whereas the witnesses suggested that the only possible survivors would have been those who threw themselves into the river before the explosion.

A report appeared following the battle of an interview with Mr. Yung, who claimed to have survived the Yangwu explosion having been stationed at the stern of the vessel. He explained that the ship had returned fire to the Volta before being hit by the spar torpedo, and orders were given to continue firing after the explosion. Fire from Hotchkiss guns on French vessels made this difficult. But, despite this Yangwu disabled the other torpedo boat. The Captain handed Yung a flotation device and decided that the junior crew member should jump first, with the Captain following. As he swam away, Yung saw the Captain helping an engineer who had suffered severe burns but shortly afterwards the fore gunpowder magazine detonated, destroying the rest of the ship.

The wreck of Yangwu drifted as the French fired on her as she caught fire and sank. The victory of the French forces at Foochow was decisive, with losses estimated either at six or 12 personnel with 27 missing. The Chinese losses were far greater, at 521 killed, 150 wounded and a large number missing after the battle. The bombardment of the arsenal lasted for two days before the French ships headed back down the river, destroying any forts they encountered on the way.
