= Zhang Peilun =

Chinese government official

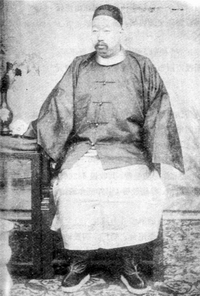
- Born: 24 November 1848; Fengrun District, Zhili Province
- Died: 4 February 1903 (aged 54); Shanghai, Qing Empire
- Education: Jinshi in 1871
- Spouse(s): Zhu Zhixiang 朱芷薌; Bian Cuiyu 邊粹玉; Li Ju’ou 李菊藕

Zhang Peilun (Chinese: 張佩綸) (1848–1903) was a Chinese government official of the late Qing dynasty, who served as a naval commander during the Sino-French War (August 1884–April 1885). He is the grandfather of novelist Eileen Chang.

== Early life ==
Zhang Peilun was born in Hangzhou on November 24, 1848. His father, Zhang Yintang (張印塘, 1797–1854), was a mid-level government official who died in office as Supervision Commissioner of Anhui when Zhang Peilun was 6, which left the family in genteel poverty. Zhang was, by all reports, a bright and studious child. After passing the provincial imperial examination at age 23 and the metropolitan one at 24, he came under the tutelage of Li Hongzao and quickly rose to prominence.

== Political views ==
Zhang was one of the foremost members of the so-called Purist Party (清流黨) led by Zhang Zhidong, an extremist group which urged resistance to French encroachment in north Vietnam in the early 1880s, even at the cost of war with France, in opposition to the more moderate stance advocated by Li Hongzhang and his supporters.

== Battle of Fuzhou ==
A well-known military enthusiast at court and having advocated a military campaign against Japan in response to the Imo Incident, Zhang was appointed in charge of defense affairs in the Southeast. However, inexperienced at command, he led Fujian Fleet into near annihilation by the French Far East Squadron, under the command of Admiral Amédée Courbet, at the Battle of Fuzhou (23 August 1884).

Ignoring repeated advice, including those from Zhan Tianyou, Zhang had made no serious attempt to coordinate the resistance of the Fujian fleet and absconded from the frontline. Zhang was demoted by the Empress Dowager Cixi on 19 September 1884 and replaced by the veteran general Zuo Zongtang. He was then exiled to serve as a soldier in Zhangjiakou, a rural town in Northeast China.

== Return from exile ==
After returning to Beijing/Tianjin in 1888, Zhang managed to find work as a secretary/scribe for his former political enemy, Li Hongzhang. Owing partly to the guilt of his part in plotting to get Zhang to Fuzhou, Li married Zhang to his eldest daughter, Li Ju’ou (李菊藕, 1866–1912), despite the couple's wide age gap and opposition from bride's mother.

Nonetheless, Li Hongzhang still refused to help Zhang enter public life again and Zhang devoted himself to his literary ambitions instead. He and his family moved to Nanjing after the wedding and Zhang, with the help of his wife, began editing the various works that he had begun writing while in exile. The couple eventually co-wrote a cookbook and a martial arts novel.

In 1903, Zhang died in Nanjing at the age of 56 due to an unspecified liver disease. His wife died nine years later and they were buried together. Their graves were exhumed and desecrated during the Cultural Revolution five decades later.

== Family ==
Zhang married a total of three times and had three sons and a daughter.

He and his first wife, Zhu Zhixiang (朱芷薌, d.1879) had two sons together, Zhang Zhicang (張志滄, who died young) and Zhang Zhiqian (張志潛, b. circa 1879).

After the death of his first wife, he eventually remarried, but his second wife, Bian Cuiyu (邊粹玉, d.1886), died while he was in exile.

In 1888, he married Li Ju‘ou. His third marriage was reportedly a happy one and produced a son and a daughter, Zhang Zhiyi (張志沂, 1896–1953) and Zhang Maoyuan (張茂淵, 1898–1991). Zhiyi's daughter, Eileen Chang, is one of the most famous Chinese writers of the 20th century.

A cousin, Zhang Renjun, is in-laws with Yuan Shikai.
