= E. C. Singer =

American engineer

E. C. Singer was an American engineer (and the nephew of Isaac Singer, inventor of the sewing machine) who worked on secret projects for the benefit of the Confederate States of America and invented a spar torpedo used during the U.S. Civil War. Singer's torpedo was a large explosive device mounted on the tip of a long spar. It was detonated by means of a trigger mechanism adapted from a rifle lock (see flintlock mechanism for a similar device). The spring-loaded trigger was detonated by means of a long cord attached to the attacking vessel. The attacking vessel rammed its target, embedding the barbed torpedo in its hull, then backed off. When the attacker reached the limit of the trigger cord, the torpedo was detonated.
