= Battle of Fuzhou =

Opening engagement of the Sino-French War

Coordinates: 25°58′37″N 119°27′04″E

Battle of Fuzhou Combat naval de Fou-Tchéou 馬江海戰
- Part of the Sino-French War
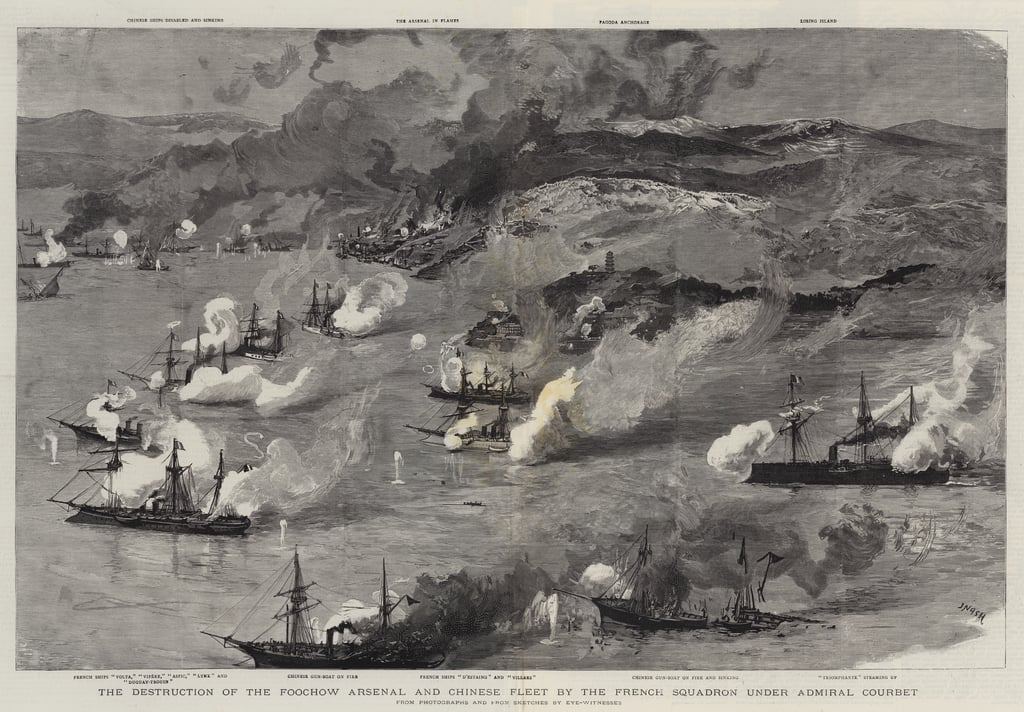
- The Battle of Fuzhou, 23 August 1884, from The Graphic
Date	23–26 August 1884
Location	Mawei Harbour, Fuzhou, China
Result	French victory

Belligerents
Qing dynasty	France

Commanders and leaders
(Qing dynasty) Zhang Peilun	(French Third Republic) Amédée Courbet

Units involved
Fujian Fleet	Far East Squadron

Strength
22 ships (11 Western-style ships, the rest Chinese junks)	13 ships

Casualties and losses
796 killed 150 wounded 51 missing 9 ships sunk 10+ ships damaged	10 killed 48 wounded 2 ships damaged
- French casualties include all casualties from 23 to 31 August 1884 (i.e. both at Fuzhou and during the descent of the Min River); The total number of Chinese casualties stands at 2,000 or 3,000 for the entire battle (i.e. including the descent of the Min River)

The Battle of Fuzhou, or Battle of Foochow, also known as the Battle of the Pagoda Anchorage (French: Combat naval de Fou-Tchéou, Chinese: 馬江海戰, 馬江之役 or 馬尾海戰, literally Battle of Mawei), was the opening engagement of the 16-month Sino-French War (December 1883 – April 1885). The battle was fought on 23 August 1884 off the Pagoda Anchorage in Mawei (馬尾) harbour, 15 kilometres (9.3 mi) to the southeast of the city of Fuzhou (Foochow). During the battle Admiral Amédée Courbet's Far East Squadron virtually destroyed the Fujian Fleet, one of the Qing dynasty's four regional fleets.

== Background ==
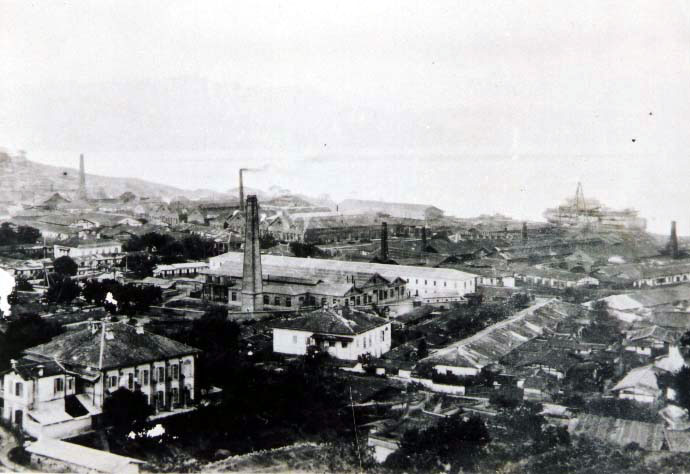
The Foochow Navy Yard, built under the direction of the French administrator Prosper Giquel

On 11 May 1884 French and Qing negotiators concluded the Tientsin Accord, an agreement designed to end several months of undeclared hostilities between France and the Qing in Tonkin. On 23 June 1884, French troops advancing to occupy Lạng Sơn, in accordance with the terms of this agreement, clashed near the small town of Bắc Lệ with a detachment of the Qing Guangxi Army. The Qing opened fire on the advancing French, precipitating a two-day battle in which the French column was seriously mauled. This incident, the Bắc Lệ ambush, was the proximate cause of the Sino-French War.

When news of the Bắc Lệ ambush reached Paris, there was fury at what was perceived as blatant Qing treachery. Jules Ferry's government demanded an apology, an indemnity, and the immediate implementation of the terms of the Tianjin Accord. The Qing government agreed to negotiate, but refused to apologise or pay an indemnity. The mood in France was against compromise, and although negotiations continued throughout July, Admiral Courbet was ordered to take his squadron to Fuzhou (Foochow).

Courbet was instructed to prepare to destroy the Foochow Navy Yard, 15 kilometres (9.3 mi) downriver from Fuzhou at Mawei, and to attack the Qing fleet in Mawei harbour. Ironically, the Foochow Navy Yard represented a substantial French investment in China's future, having been built several years earlier under the direction of the French administrator Prosper Giquel. During the second half of July and the first half of August Courbet gradually concentrated his squadron in Mawei harbour, at the Pagoda Anchorage—named for a conspicuous Chinese pagoda, the Luoxingta (羅星塔), which stood on a hill above the harbour.

Negotiations between France and the Qing broke down in mid-August, and on the evening of 22 August Courbet was authorised by the French government to commence hostilities. He duly notified the foreign consuls, the governor-general of Fujian and Zhejiang, and the commanders of several neutral warships moored at the Pagoda Anchorage (the British gunboats HMS Vigilant, Champion and Sapphire and the American corvette USS Enterprise).

=== Order of battle ===
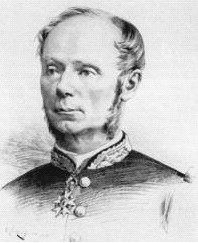
Admiral Anatole-Amédée-Prosper Courbet (1827–85)

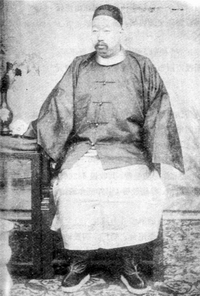
Zhang Peilun (1843–1903), the Chinese commander at Fuzhou

Only a fraction of the Far East squadron was present off the Pagoda Anchorage on the morning of 23 August. In particular, none of the Far East squadron's four ironclads was immediately available. Bayard, Courbet's flagship, was at Sharp Peak near the island of Matsu, guarding a vital telegraph station. Atalante was hunting down pirate ships in the Gulf of Tonkin. Courbet had summoned the ironclads Triomphante from Shanghai and La Galissonnière from Keelung to join him off Fuzhou, but La Galissonnière had been detained at Keelung by bad weather, and although Triomphante was approaching the Min River, it was not clear whether she would be able to cross the bar at its entrance.

Courbet had under his immediate command the first-class cruisers Duguay-Trouin, Villars and d'Estaing, the third-class cruiser Volta (which he chose as his flagship during the engagement), the gunboats Lynx, Aspic and Vipère and Torpedo Boats No. 45 and No. 46. The second-class cruiser Châteaurenault and the troopship Saône had been left at the Jinpai pass, at the entrance to the Min River, to stop the Chinese from laying a barrage to prevent the squadron's escape.

The Chinese Fujian fleet consisted of the wooden corvette Yangwu (the flagship), the scout-transports Chenhang, Yongbao, Fupo, Feiyun and Ji'an, the paddle steamer Yixin, the wooden gunboats Zhenwei and Fuxing, and the Rendel flatiron gunboats Fusheng and Jiansheng. Twelve large junks were nearby, but did not take part in the battle. The French squadron displaced 14,500 tons and included 1,780 men, while the eleven warships in the Chinese fleet displaced 8,000 tons, and included 1,040 men. The French squadron was much better-led and better-armed than the Chinese fleet. Only a few of the Chinese ships were capable of offering serious resistance to Courbet's attack. The Chinese defence was under the command of the imperial commissioner Zhang Peilun (張佩綸), one of the leading members of China's war party.

==== French squadron ====
Name	Type	Specifications	Construction	Captain
Triomphante	station ironclad (cuirassé de croisière)	4,585 tons	1879, Rochefort	capitaine de vaisseau Baux
La Galissonnière	station ironclad (cuirassé de croisière)	4,645 tons	1874, Brest	capitaine de vaisseau Fleuriais
Duguay-Trouin	1st class iron cruiser	3,479 tons	1879, Cherbourg	capitaine de vaisseau Desnouy
Villars	1st class cruiser	2,363 tons	1881, Cherbourg	capitaine de vaisseau Vivielle
d'Estaing	1st class cruiser	2,363 tons	1881, Brest	capitaine de vaisseau Coulombeaud
Châteaurenault	2nd class wooden cruiser	1,820 tons	1869, Normand	capitaine de frégate Le Pontois
Volta	3rd class wooden cruiser	1,323 tons	1869, Cherbourg	capitaine de frégate Gigon
Saône	transport	1,575 tons	1880, Toulon	capitaine de frégate Monin
Lynx	composite gunboat	465 tons	~1870s, Cherbourg	lieutenant de vaisseau Bonaire
Aspic	composite gunboat	465 tons	~1870s, Rochefort	lieutenant de vaisseau de Fauque de Jonquières
Vipère	composite gunboat	465 tons	~1870s, Rochefort	lieutenant de vaisseau Picard Destelan
Torpedo Boat No. 45	torpedo boat	30,58 tons	~1879, Le Havre	lieutenant de vaisseau Latour
Torpedo Boat No. 46	torpedo boat	30,58 tons	~1879, Le Havre	lieutenant de vaisseau Douzans

==== Chinese squadron ====
Name (pinyin)	Name (Wade Giles)	Characters	Type	Construction	Specifications	Captain
Yangwu	Yang wu	揚武	wooden corvette	1872, Foochow Navy Yard	1,393 tons, 15 knots, 13 British muzzle-loaders	Chang Ch'eng
Yongbao	Yung-pao	永保	scout-transport	1873, Foochow Navy Yard	1,391 tons, 3 guns	(in dock)
Chenhang	Ch'en-hang	琛航	scout-transport	1874, Foochow Navy Yard	1,391 tons, 3 guns	(in dock)
Fupo	Fu-p'o	伏波	scout-transport	1870, Foochow Navy Yard	1,258 tons, 5 guns	Lü Wen-ying
Feiyun	Fei-yun	飛雲	scout-transport	1872, Foochow Navy Yard	1,258 tons, 13 knots, 5 Prussian breechloaders	Kao Teng-yün
Ji'an	Chi-an	濟安	scout-transport	1873, Foochow Navy Yard	1,258 tons, 12 knots, 5 guns	?
Zhenwei	Chen-wei	振威	wooden gunboat	1872, Foochow Navy Yard	572.5 tons, 10 knots, 6 guns	Hsü Shou-shen
Fuxing	Fu-hsing	福星	wooden gunboat	1870, Foochow Navy Yard	515 tons, 3 guns	Ch'en Ying
Fusheng	Fu-sheng	福勝	Rendel flatiron gunboat	1875, Laird, Birkenhead	280 tons	Yeh Chen
Jiansheng	Chien-sheng	建勝	Rendel flatiron gunboat	1875, Laird, Birkenhead	250 tons	Lin Sen-lin
Yixin	I-hsin	藝新	river patrol boat	1876, Foochow Navy Yard	No details available	Lin Tse-yu

Qing Forts and their armaments on the Min River
Location	210mm	203mm	178mm	150mm-177mm	120mm	Smoothbore guns	total
Couding island (and vicinity)	1					14	15
Mingan Pass	1		3			39	43
Fork of the Min River		1	6	3		8	18
Couding and Mingan region						19	19
Northern Fork of the Min River		1	4		2	15	22
Wufou island			2	5		15	22
Total	2	2	15	8	2	110	140

=== Fleet deployments ===
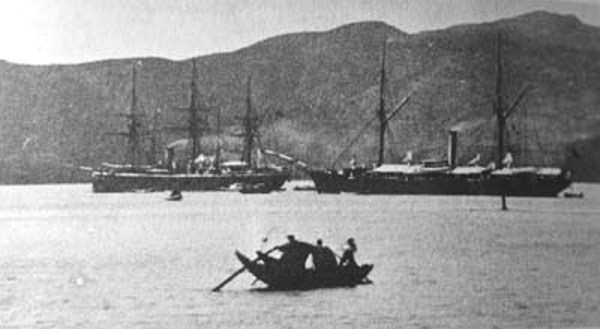
The Chinese flagship Yangwu and the gunboat Fuxing at anchor off the Foochow Navy Yard on the eve of the battle

The Chinese fleet was deployed into a northern group of eight ships and a southern group of three ships, with the French squadron lying in between. The wooden corvette Yangwu, the wooden gunboat Fuxing, the armed transport Fupo, the Rendel flatiron gunboats Jiansheng and Fusheng and the small paddle steamer Yixin were deployed on the northwest curve of the river, between the French ships and the Foochow Navy Yard. A little behind them lay the unarmed transports Yongbao and Chenhang, anchored just off the dockyard. The role of this northern group of ships was obviously to prevent the French from attacking the Navy Yard. Meanwhile, the armed wooden transports Ji'an and Feiyun and the wooden gunboat Zhenwei lay downstream of the French squadron, dangerously isolated on the southwesterly leg of the river, in front of the Customs building. Their job seems to have been to protect the Customs building and to block Courbet's exit from the Min River.

Courbet's plan provided for overwhelming firepower to be deployed against the Chinese fleet. He had noticed that the Chinese ships swung with the tide, and determined to make his attack just before the top of the tide at 2:00 pm on the following afternoon, Saturday 23 August, when with luck the Chinese ships would have swung away from the French ships and would be presenting their vulnerable sterns to the attackers. This timing was also important for another reason. If Triomphante successfully ascended the Min River, it was about then that she would be making her appearance.

Assuming that the Chinese fleet did not change its position, Courbet's orders provided for the French ships to be at action stations at 1:45 pm and to go into action at around 2:00 pm, on his signal. The battle would begin with an attack by Torpedo Boats No. 45 and No. 46 on Yangwu and Fupo. This attack would be supported by cannon and rifle fire from Volta. Volta would then concentrate on destroying a line of war junks and fireships drawn up just to the west of Losing Island. Once the attack by the torpedo boats had cleared the way, the gunboats Aspic, Vipère and Lynx would sail upriver towards the Navy Yard and take on the other ships of the Chinese northern group. Four steam launches under the command of lieutenant de vaisseau Augustin Boué de Lapeyrère, the future French admiral, were given the job of protecting Volta and the three French gunboats from attack by the Chinese mineboats. To the east Duguay-Trouin, Villars and d'Estaing were to reduce the three ships of the Chinese southern group, to engage the war junks from the flank, and to engage a battery armed with three Krupp cannon near the Pagoda, and three other batteries armed with Krupp cannon which protected the Arsenal. Their launches would be deployed to give protection against Chinese torpedo attacks.

== Battle ==
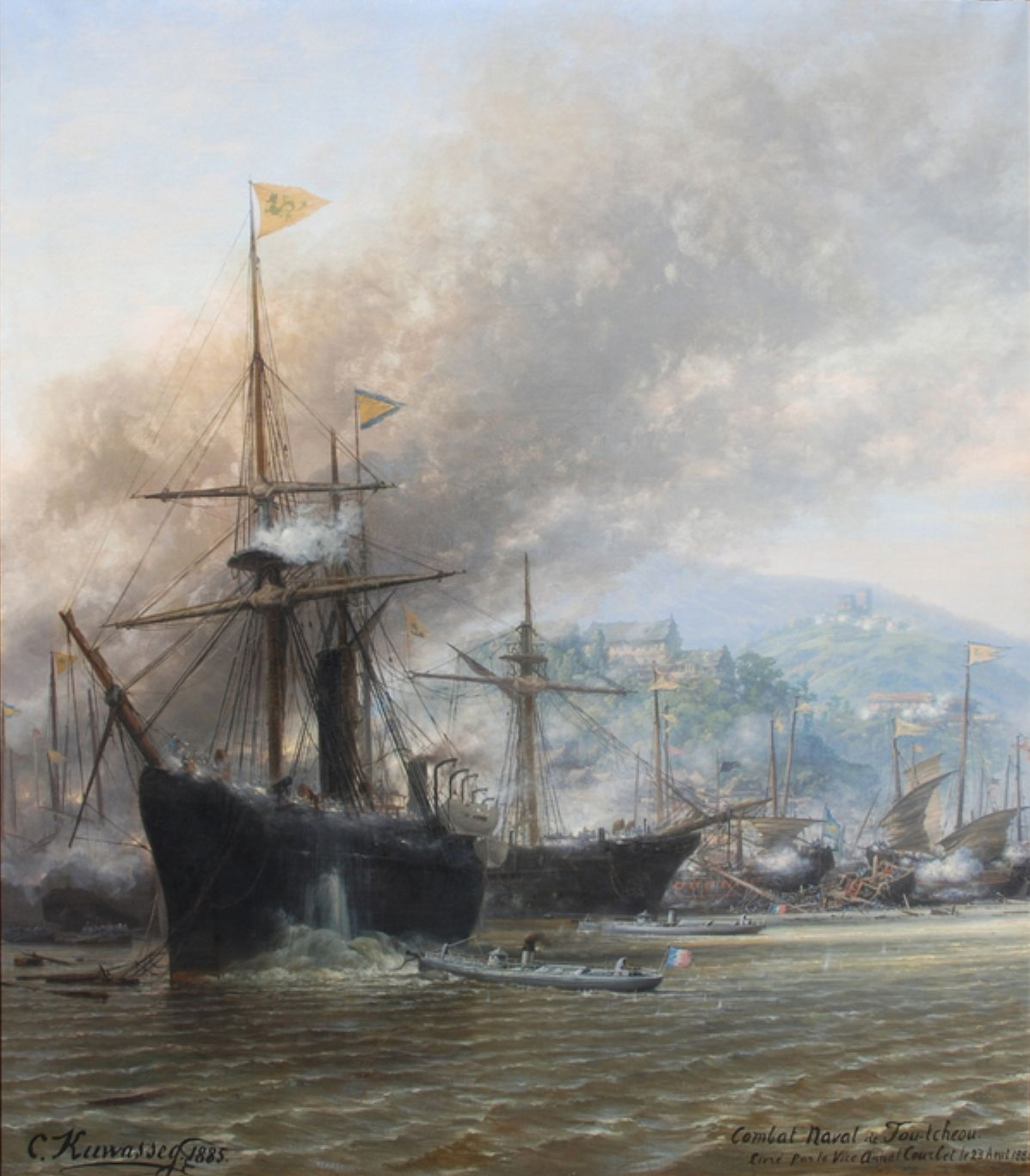
The Chinese flagship Yangwu and the armed transport Fupo under attack by French torpedo boats No. 46 and No. 45. Combat naval de Fou-Tchéou ('The naval battle at Foochow'), by Charles Kuwasseg, 1885

=== French attack ===
On the morning of Saturday 23 August, although the Chinese commanders knew that the French would launch their attack at around 2:00 pm, the sailors in both fleets went about their routine business. The ships of the Fujian Fleet made no attempt to redeploy or to anticipate the French attack by opening fire first. The French crews went to their action stations at 1:30 pm, after eating their midday meal. The Chinese did not react to this obvious threat, and at 1:45 pm the flurry of activity aboard the French ships died down. For the next ten minutes the tension grew aboard the French ships as the minutes ticked away towards 2:00 pm. At 1:55 pm a Chinese mineboat advanced towards the French squadron. Courbet immediately ordered the attack to begin, only five minutes short of his original timetable.

At the outset of the battle the Chinese flagship Yangwu was successfully attacked with a spar torpedo by Torpedo Boat No. 46 (lieutenant de vaisseau Douzans) and grounded. The French torpedo boat suffered damage to her boiler during this attack. The despatch vessel Fupo was attacked less successfully by Torpedo Boat No. 45 (lieutenant de vaisseau Latour), and was subsequently crippled by Volta's torpedo launch and carried by boarding by Boué de Lapeyrère's sailors. She had already been set alight by French shellfire, and was eventually abandoned by the French prize crew and sank in the middle of the Min River.

Their spar torpedoes expended, the two French torpedo boats drifted downriver after making their attack, towards the anchorage of the neutral vessels off Losing Island. Lieutenant Latour had been seriously wounded in the eye during the attack, but he refused an offer of medical assistance from American officers on Enterprise, explaining that he could not leave his post while the battle was still in progress.

Meanwhile, the French cruisers and the ironclad Triomphante, which joined the French squadron only minutes before the battle began, were making short work of the rest of the Chinese fleet. Chenhang, Yongbao, Feiyun, Ji'an, Fusheng and Jiansheng were either sunk or set alight by shellfire from the cruisers Duguay-Trouin, Villars and d'Estaing. Only Fupo and Yixin survived the battle without serious damage, by escaping upriver before the gunboats Lynx, Aspic and Vipère had a chance to engage them. Zhenwei was blown up by a single shell from Triomphante.

Before they were put out of action the outgunned Chinese vessels concentrated their fire on the French flagship Volta, hoping to kill Courbet and the officers of his entourage. Several sailors aboard the French cruiser were killed or wounded, and shortly after the start of the battle a roundshot ploughed through Courbet's command group on the flagship's bridge, killing the British pilot Thomas and only narrowly missing capitaine de frégate Gigon, Volta's captain. A few minutes later splinters from an exploding Chinese shell wounded lieutenant de vaisseau Ravel, Courbet's aide-de-camp.

The fighting ended at 5:00 pm, but during the night of 23 August the Chinese made a number of unsuccessful attacks with fireships on the French warships, obliging some of them to shift their anchorages to evade them.

=== Bombardment of the Foochow Navy Yard ===
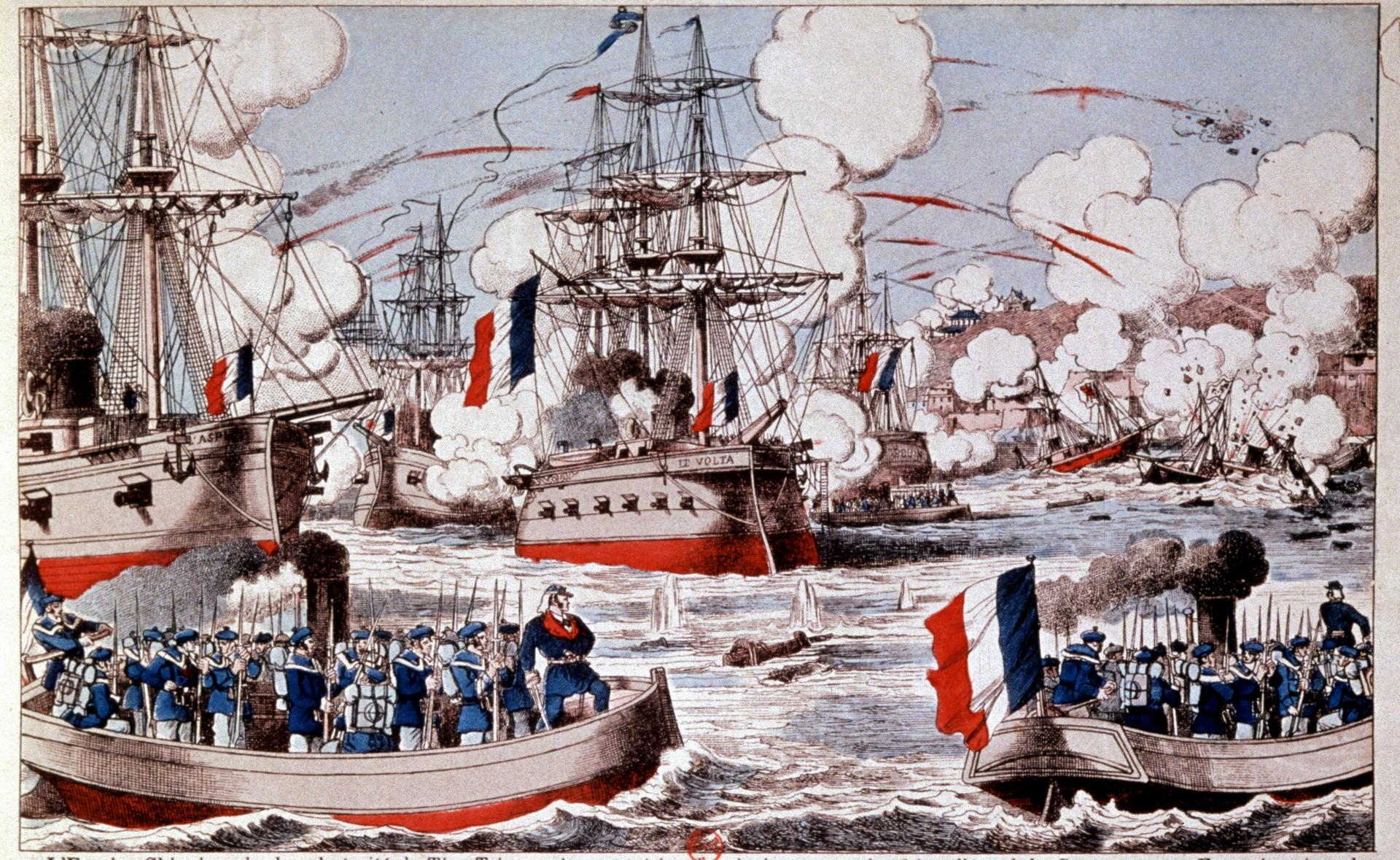
Bombardment of the Foochow Navy Yard, 24 August 1884

On the morning of 24 August Courbet issued orders for his ships' landing companies to go ashore with the naval engineers to destroy the Foochow Navy Yard. Preparations were made for a landing, but Courbet then changed his mind, after observing that the Navy Yard was defended by organised groups of Chinese infantry. The attack was cancelled as the French sailors were on the point of climbing into their launches.

Instead, the French bombarded the Foochow Navy Yard, damaging a number of outbuildings and holing the sloop Henghai (Heng-hai, 橫海), still under construction and lying on the slips. A certain amount of damage was inflicted, but without the support of the heavy guns of Triomphante and Duguay-Trouin or the slightly lighter guns of the cruisers Villars and d'Estaing, which drew too much water to enter the shallows off the Navy Yard except around high tide, Courbet was unable to destroy the Yard completely. He himself admitted in his official report that the damage done 'was not as much as I had hoped for'.

The French squadron remained off Fuzhou during the night of 24 August. Once again the Chinese tried to make a night attack. At 4:00 am two Chinese torpedo launches tried to attack the gunboat Vipère, anchored at the head of the French line. Both launches were lit up by searchlights on the French ships and attacked with Hotchkiss fire by Duguay-Trouin. One launch was sunk instantly, while the crew of the other abandoned ship and swam for the shore.

=== Descent of the Min River ===
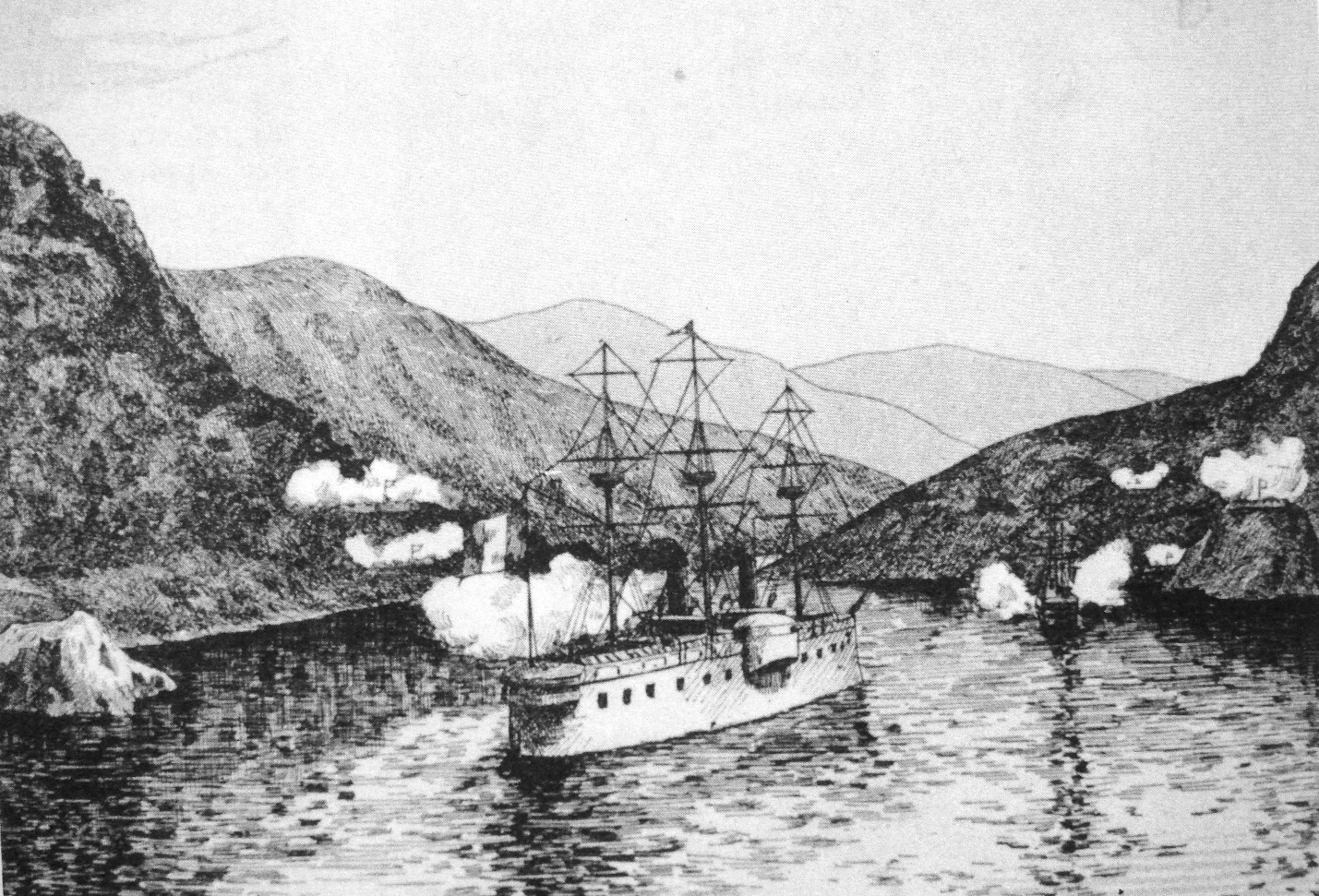
The French cruiser Duguay-Trouin leads the way into the Min'an pass, followed by the ironclad Triomphante

On 25 August, after receiving the congratulations of the captains of the neutral warships on the professionalism displayed by the French squadron during the action of 23 August, Courbet began to lead his ships back down the Min River. The squadron's two heaviest ships, Triomphante and Duguay-Trouin, led the way.

On 25 and 26 August the French bombarded the Tianluowan (田螺灣) and Min'an (閩安) batteries, two Chinese shore batteries covering the approach to Fuzhou through the narrow Min'an Pass. The Chinese batteries, built to fire only on enemy ships approaching from the mouth of the river, were taken in reverse and destroyed by Duguay-Trouin and Triomphante.

On 27 and 28 August the French squadron bombarded and destroyed the Chinese defences at the Jinpai pass near the entrance to the Min River. The Jinpai (金牌) and Changmen (長門) batteries, known to the French as Fort Kimpai and the White Fort (Fort Blanc), were put out of action, and the French also inflicted heavy casualties on a number of Chinese field batteries and infantry formations. However, before its guns were destroyed the White Fort was able to inflict moderate damage on the French ironclad La Galissonnière, which had sailed up from Keelung to join Courbet's squadron and attempted unsuccessfully to fight its way into the Min River. Chinese infantry at the Jinpai pass also killed and wounded several French sailors aboard the gunboat Vipère on 27 August.

== Aftermath ==
=== Losses ===
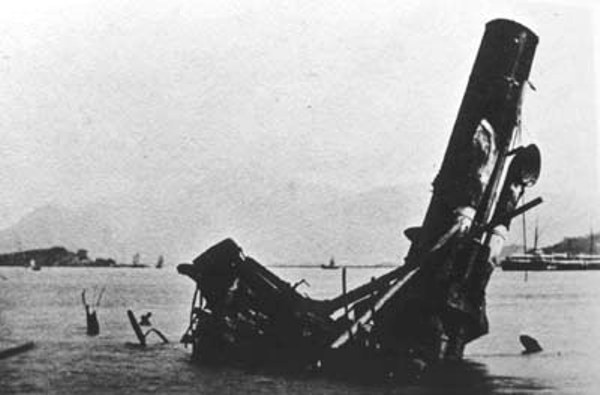
The wreckage of the Chinese flagship Yangwu

The losses of the French squadron in the course of the operations before Fuzhou and in the Min River were relatively light (10 dead and 48 wounded). Most of these casualties were inflicted not by shellfire during the engagement of 23 August but by sniper fire from Chinese infantry during the squadron's descent of the Min River. The French dead included lieutenant de vaisseau Bouët-Willaumez, second-in-command of the gunboat Vipère and son of the noted French admiral Louis-Édouard Bouët-Willaumez (1809–71), who was shot dead on Vipère's bridge during an exchange of fire with the defenders of Fort Kimpai on 27 August. With the exception of La Galissonnière and Torpedo Boat No. 46, none of Courbet's vessels suffered serious damage.

The Chinese lost nine of the eleven ships of the Fujian Fleet. Some of the Chinese ships foundered where they were struck, sinking off the Pagoda anchorage and the Foochow Navy Yard. Others drifted downriver and either ran aground or sank between Losing Island and the Min'an pass. French officers aboard Châteaurenault, anchored near the entrance to the Min River, saw three Chinese warships drifting downriver on the evening of 23 August, abandoned by their crews and blazing from stem to stern. One of the Chinese ships exploded in front of their eyes.

Courbet estimated Chinese casualties at between 2,000 and 3,000 dead. The commemorative tablets in a shrine erected shortly after the war at the Pagoda Anchorage to honour the Chinese dead list the names of 831 sailors and soldiers killed on 23 August, but this list does not include the hundreds of Chinese soldiers killed by the French during their descent of the Min River.

The Chinese imperial commissioner Zhang Peilun, who made no serious attempt to coordinate the resistance of the Fujian fleet, was degraded after the battle and replaced by the veteran general Zuo Zongtang (左宗棠). He Jing (何璟), the governor-general of Fujian and Zhejiang, Zhang Zhaotong (張兆棟), the governor of Fujian, and He Ruzhang (何如璋), the director-general of the Foochow Navy Yard, were also degraded. The Manchu General of Fuzhou Mutušan (穆圖善), who had directed the defence of the Jinpai pass on 27 and 28 August with skill and energy, kept his job.

The Cantonese naval officer Zhang Cheng (張成), a graduate of the Foochow naval college and captain of the Chinese flagship Yangwu, abandoned ship as soon as the battle started and was later beheaded for cowardice.

=== Factors in the French victory ===
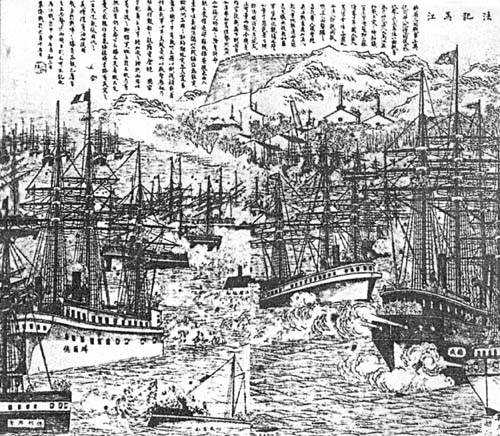
A Chinese lithograph of the Battle of Fuzhou

One of the factors in the French victory at Fuzhou was that the French squadron had sailed up the Min River in time of peace. The Chinese claimed after the battle, with some justification, that the French would never have been able to ascend the river if the two countries had been at war. A second important factor was the absence from the battle of the modern battleships Dingyuan and Zhenyuan, which had recently been completed in Germany for China's Beiyang Fleet (Northern Seas fleet). The Chinese battleships were more powerful than any of the ships under Courbet's command, and in December 1883, foreseeing that war with China was imminent, the French persuaded the German government to detain them in the event of hostilities. The German government invented a number of plausible excuses for keeping the two battleships in port, and they remained in Germany for the duration of the Sino-French War. They were finally released in July 1885, and joined the Northern Seas fleet in October of the same year.

Some Chinese historians have asserted that disunity in the Chinese command structure was an important factor in the Chinese defeat. The Chinese regional fleets and armies represented a considerable 'personal' investment of revenue and prestige that was used to leverage influence at court, and the respective fleet commanders were often loath to see these important assets diminished by war damage. The result, at Fuzhou, was that the Fujian Fleet received little help from China's three other regional fleets. Despite appeals from Zhang Peilun and direct orders from the Empress Dowager Cixi, the commanders of the Beiyang Fleet, the Nanyang Fleet and the Guangdong Fleet declined to send ships to reinforce the Fujian Fleet. Feiyun and Ji'an, two Fujian vessels which had been loaned to the Guangdong Fleet in 1882 to observe French movements in the Gulf of Tonkin, were sent back to Fuzhou in early August by Zhang Zhidong, the governor-general of the two Guangs, arriving just in time to share the fate of their comrades in the forthcoming battle. However, Zhang did not release any of his own Guangdong ships. Li Hongzhang defied an order to send two ships from the Beiyang Fleet to Fuzhou, and the Zhejiang governor Liu Bingzhang (劉秉璋) refused to release the Nanyang ship Chaowu.

== Gallery ==
France:

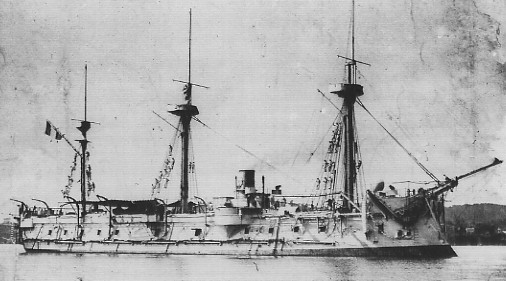
Triomphante

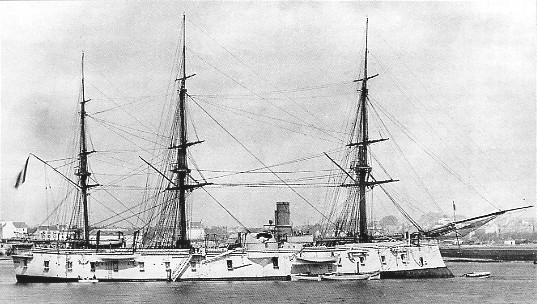
La Galissonnière

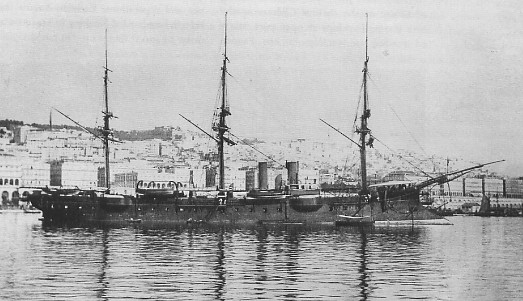
Duguay-Trouin

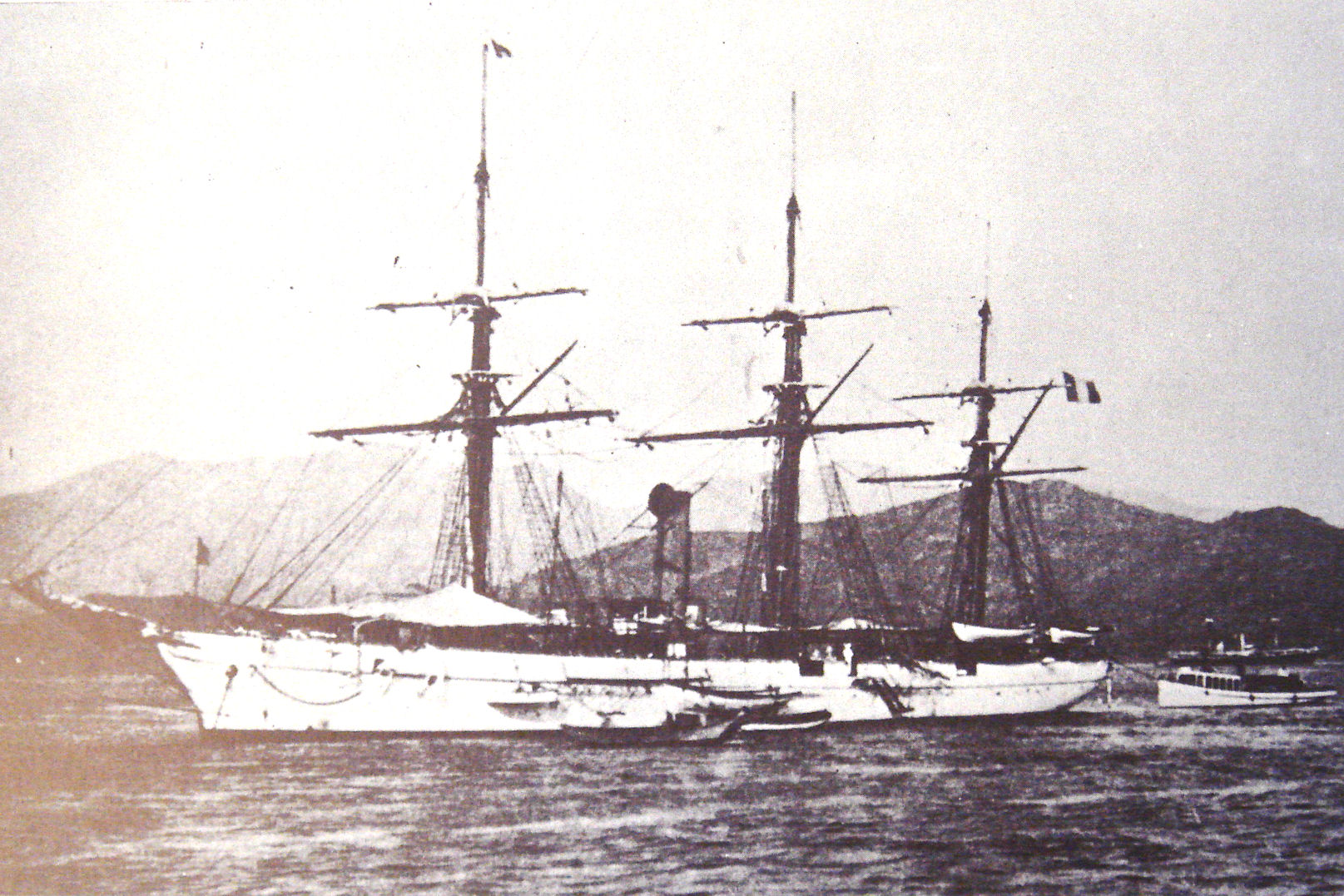
Volta

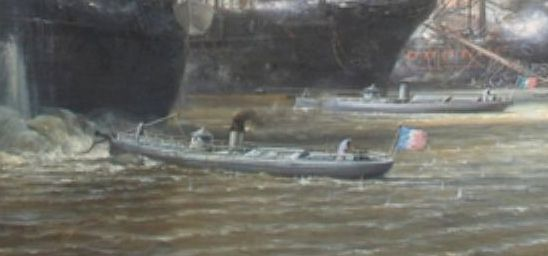
Torpedo boats No.46 and No.45.

(Qing dynasty) China:

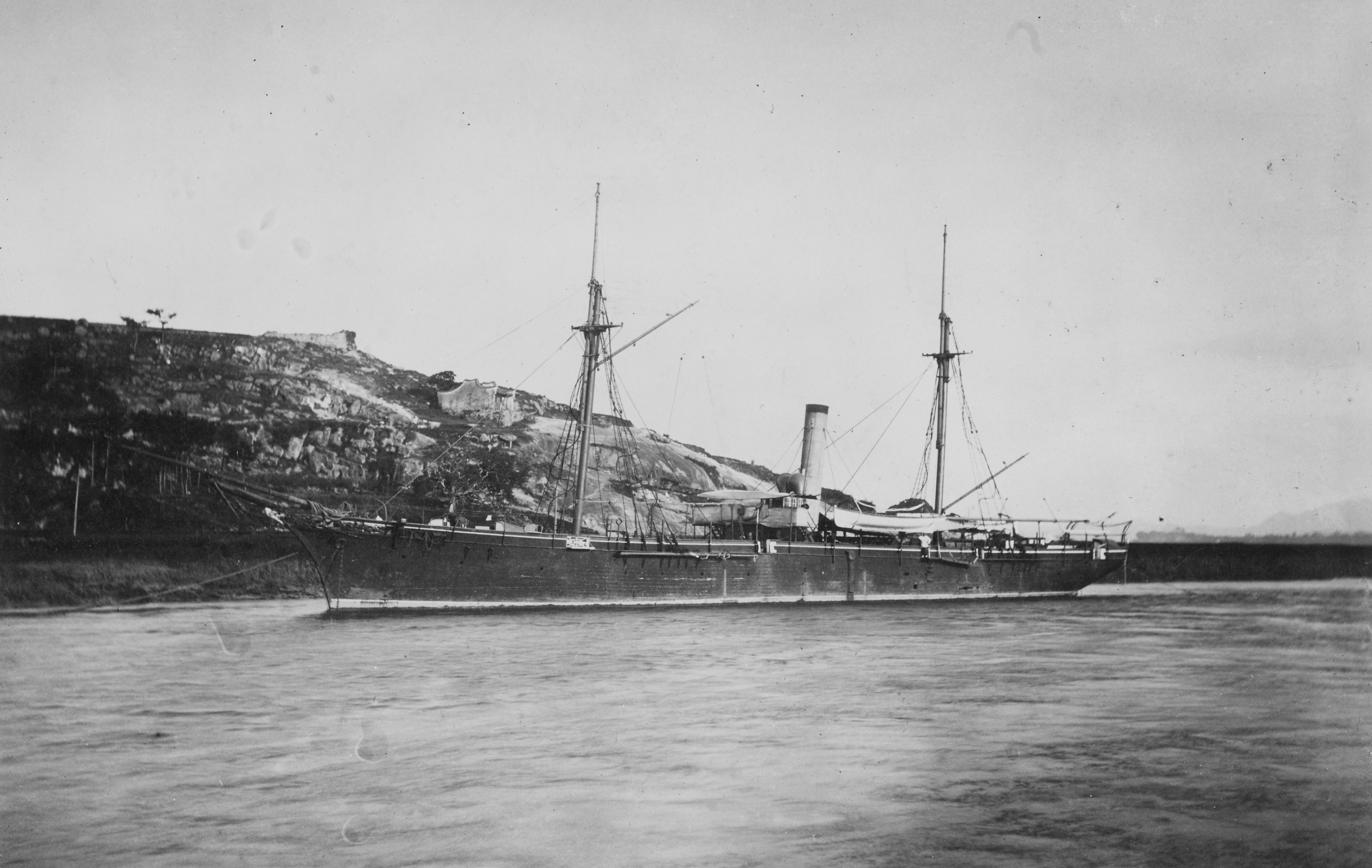
Fupo (伏波)

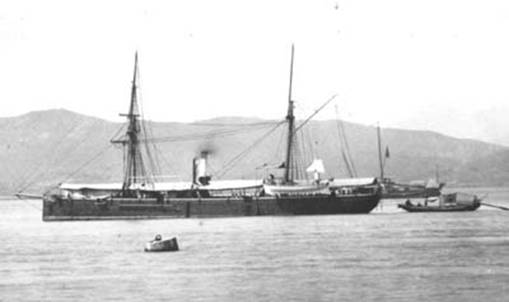
Fuxing (福星)

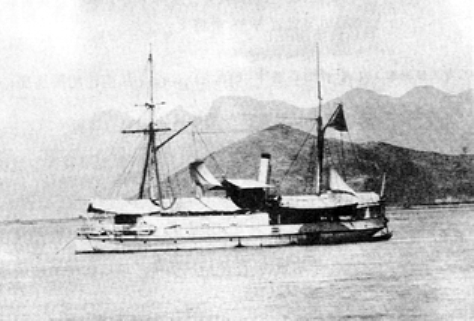
Jiansheng (建勝)

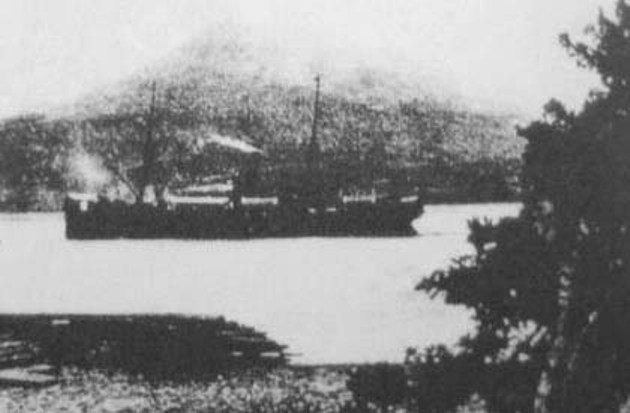
Yixin (藝新)
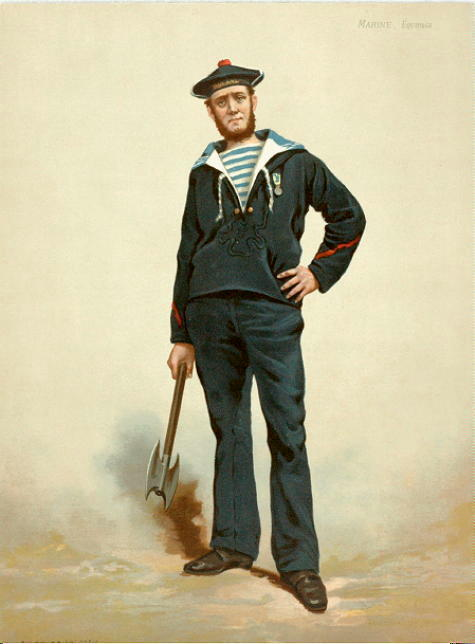
French sailor

'Going into battle'

== The battlefield today ==
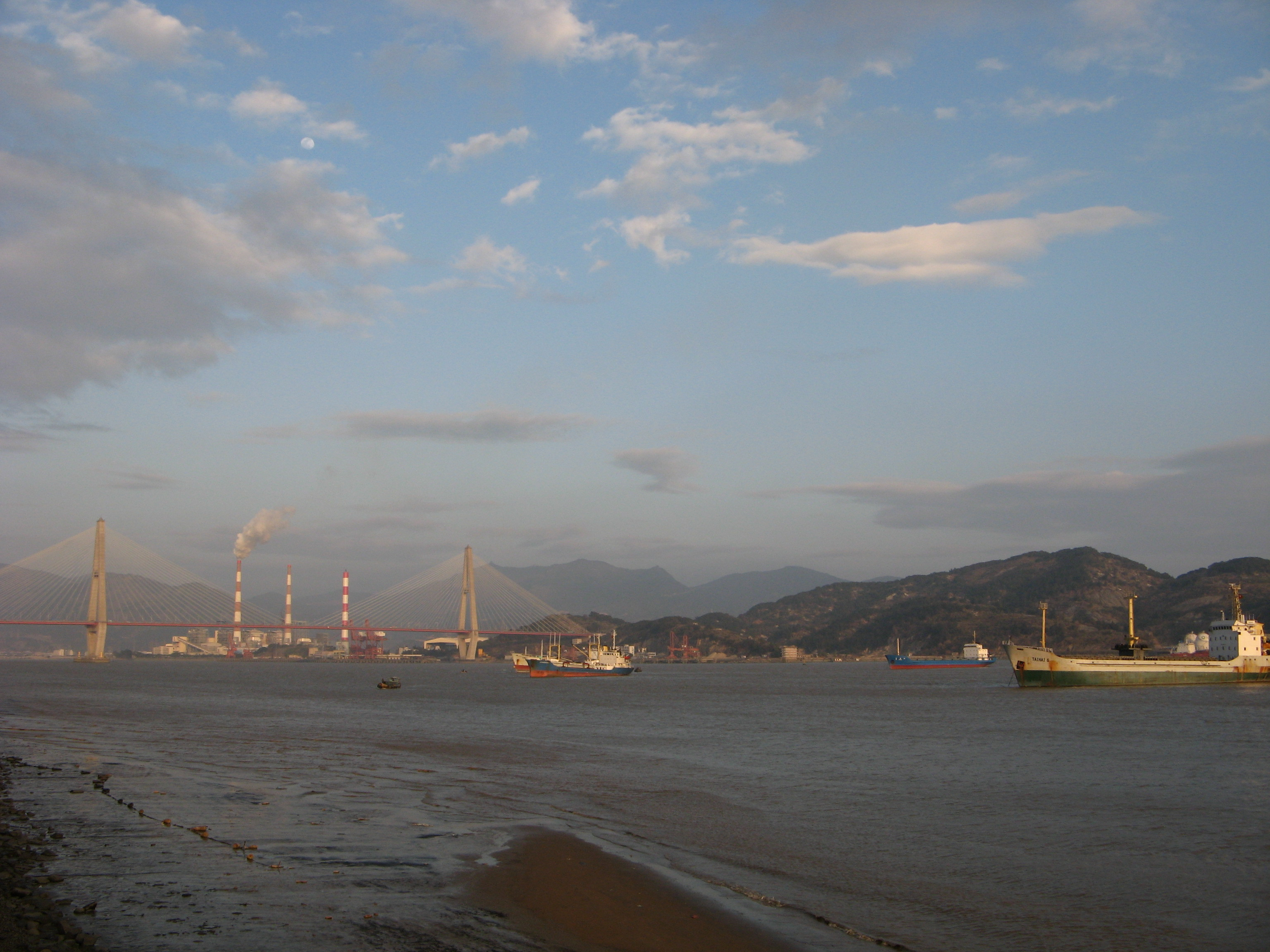

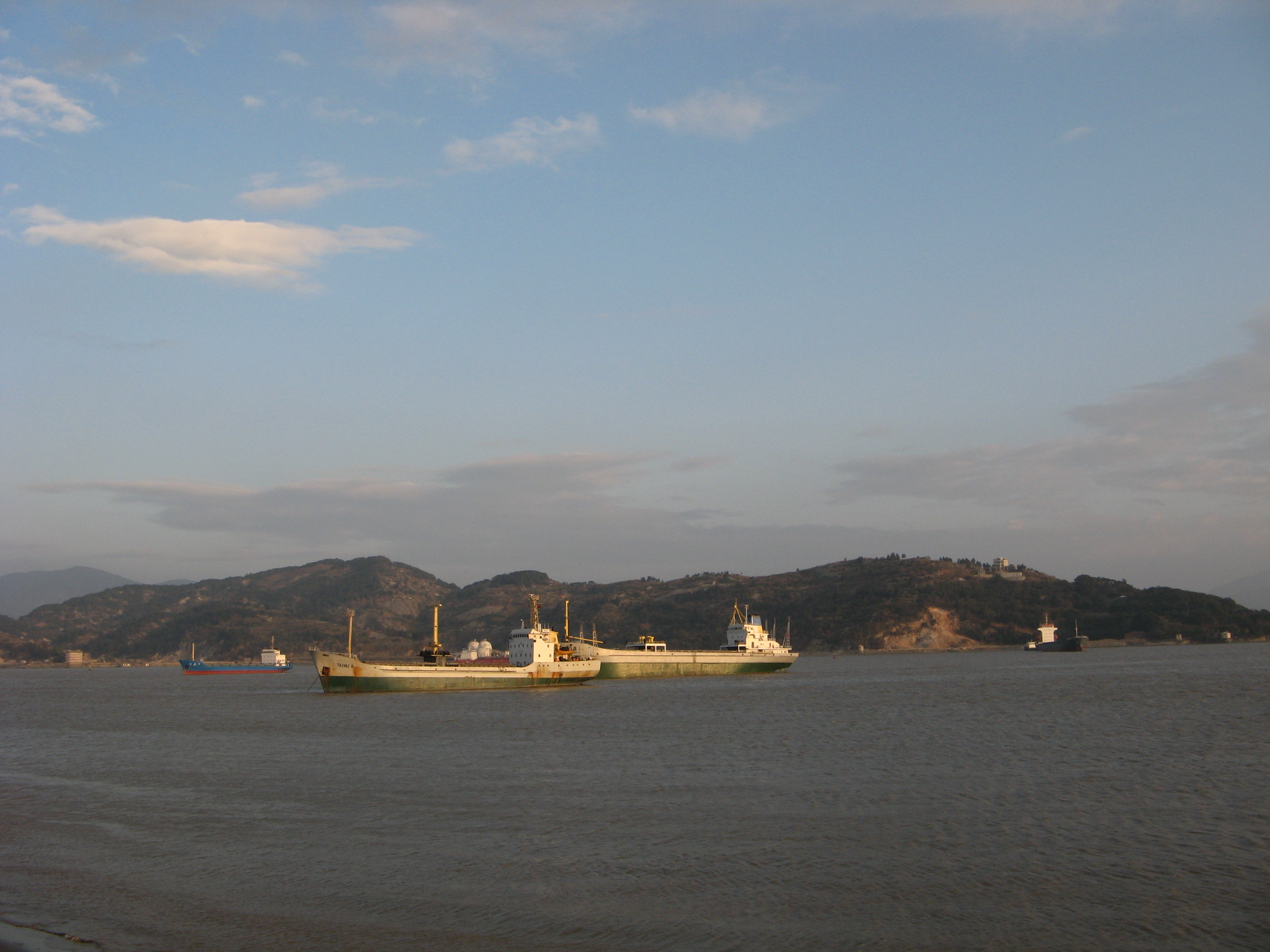

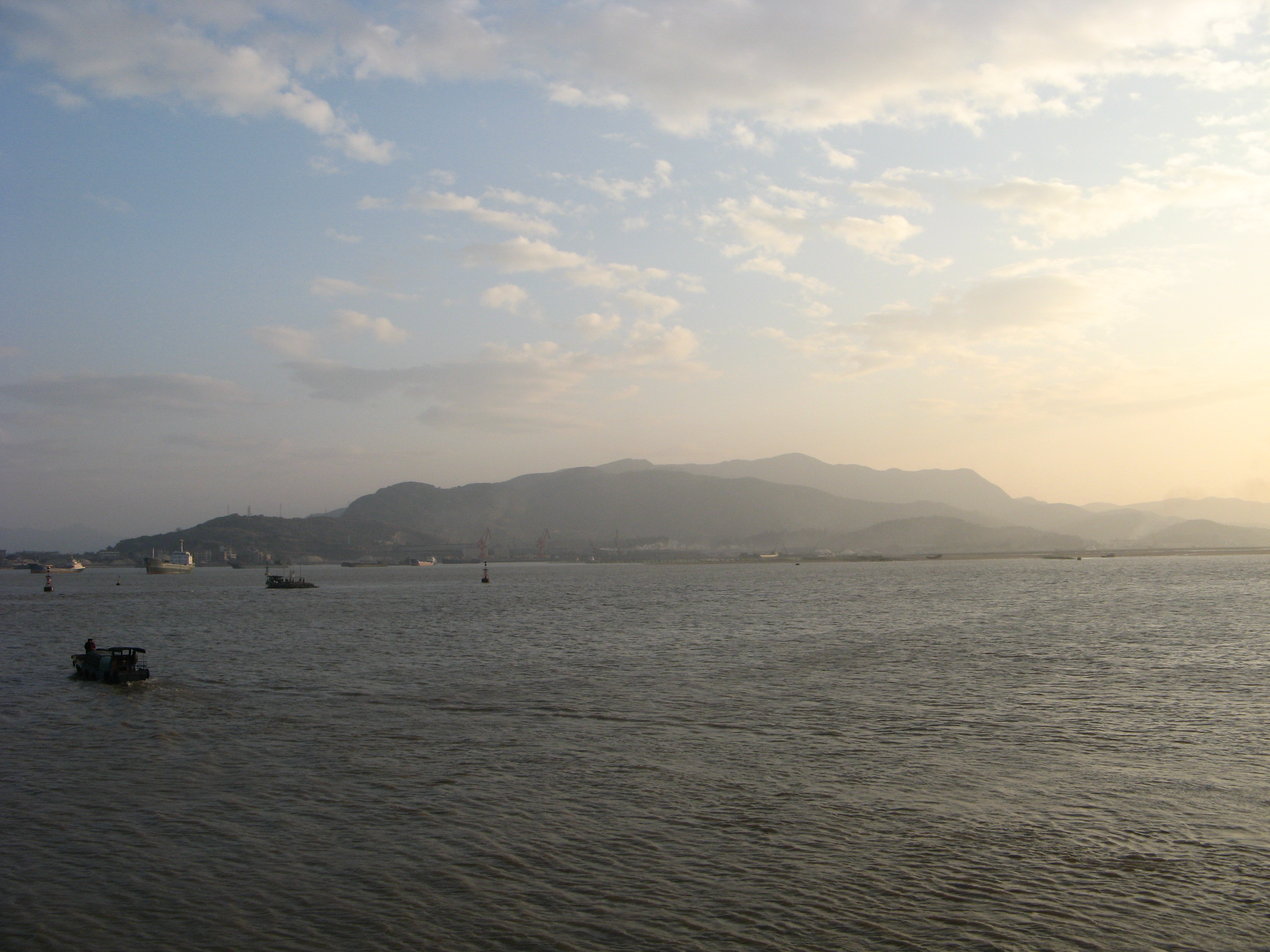

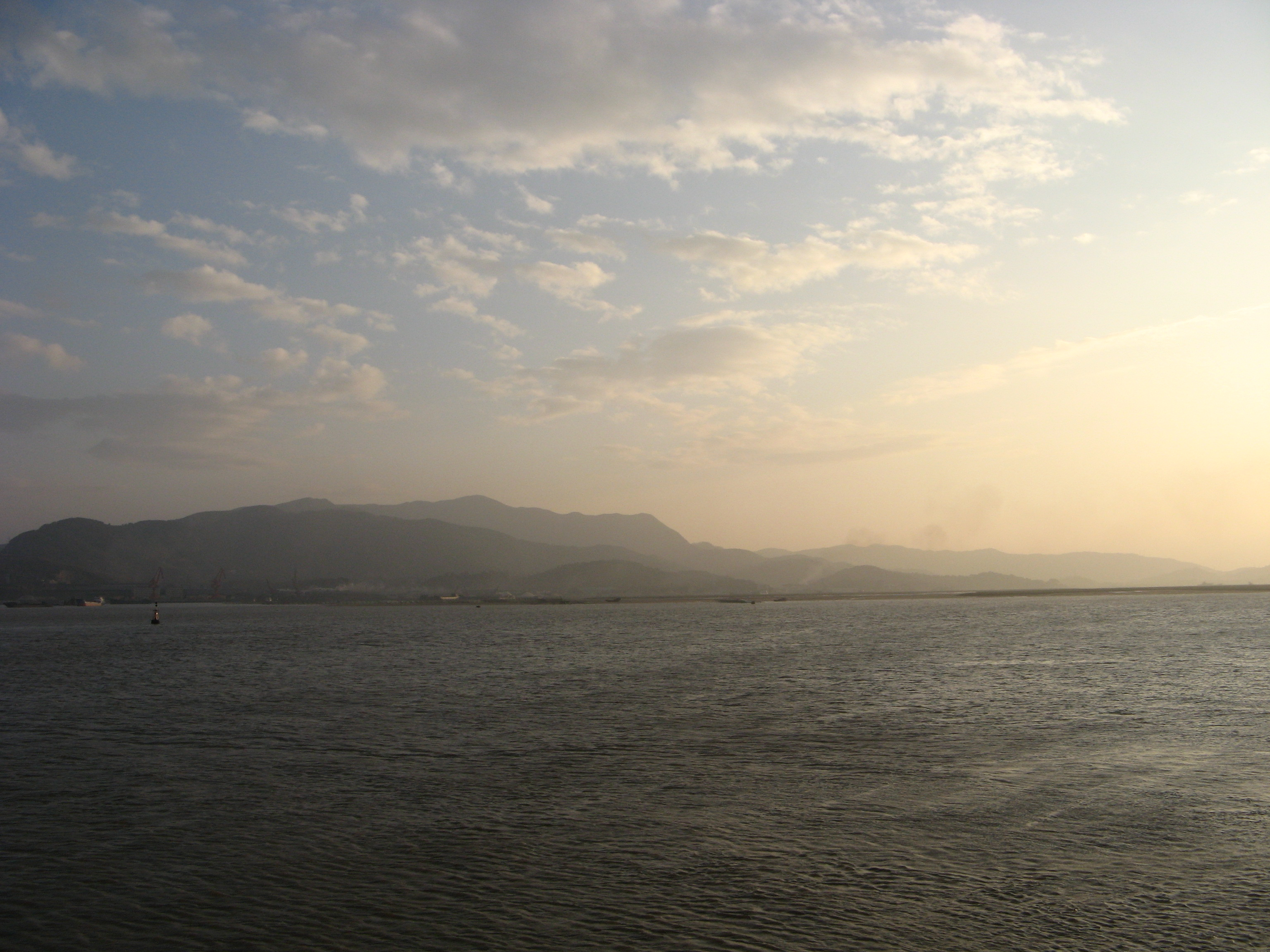

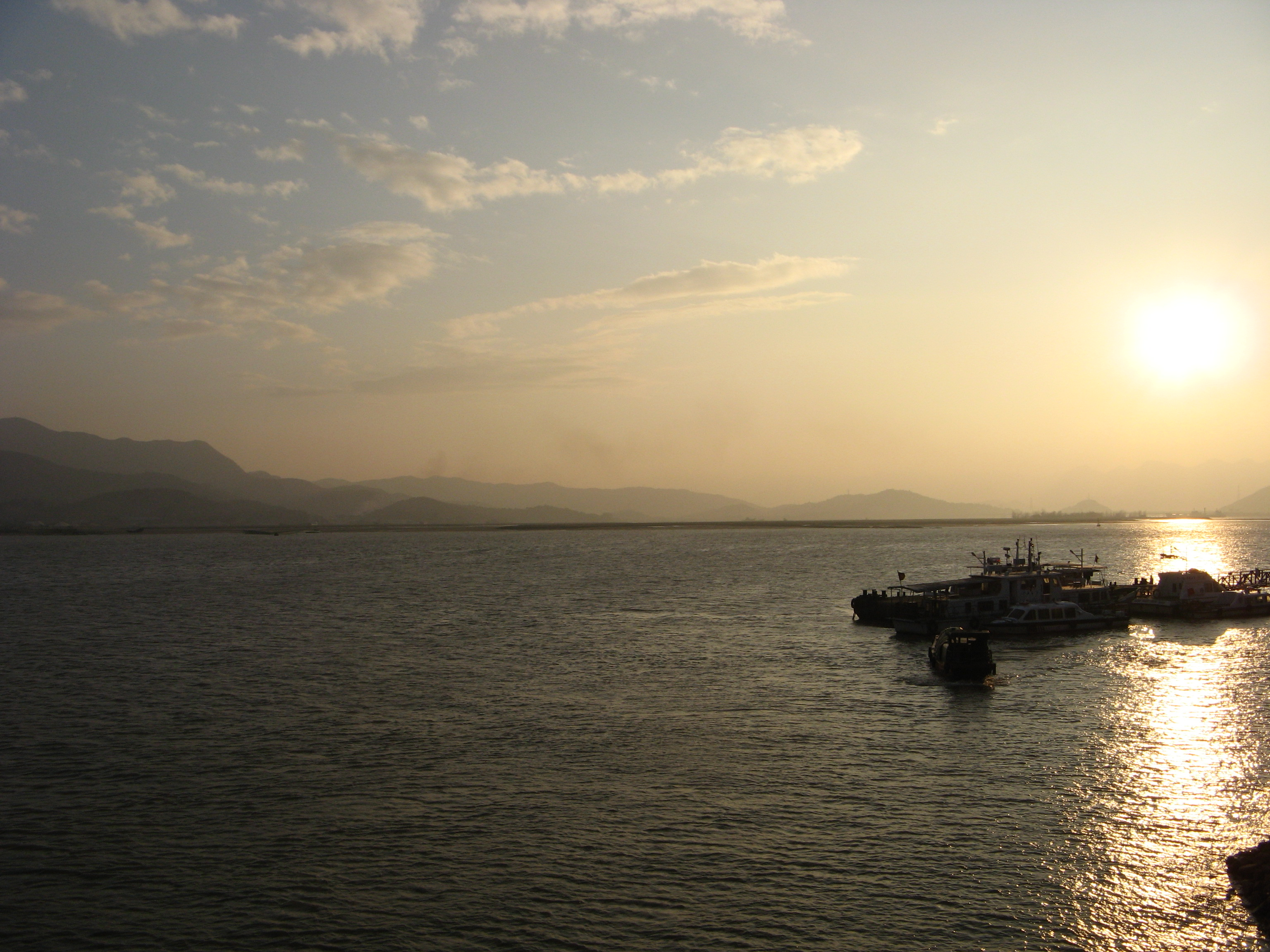
