= Fujian Fleet =

Qing China military fleet (1678–1912)

- Ensign of Fujian Fleet
- Active: 1678 – 1912
- Country: (China) Qing dynasty
- Allegiance: Emperor of China
- Branch: Imperial Chinese Navy
- Garrison/HQ: Fujian
- Battle honours: Sino-French War; First Sino-Japanese War

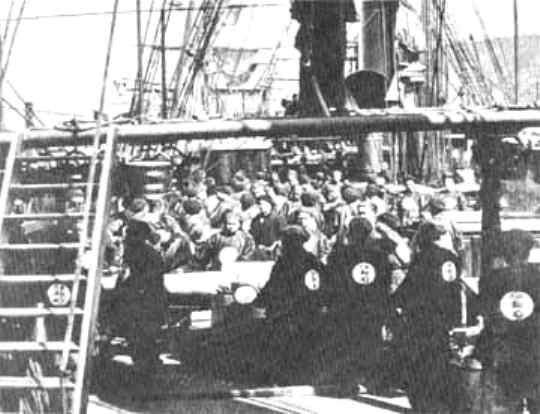
Crewmen aboard the corvette Yangwu, flagship of the Fujian fleet

The Fujian Fleet (simplified Chinese: 福建水师; traditional Chinese: 福建水師; pinyin: Fújiàn Shuǐshī; Pe̍h-ōe-jī: Hok-kiàn Chúi-su or simplified Chinese: 福州舰队; traditional Chinese: 福州艦隊; pinyin: Fúzhōu Jiànduì) founded in 1678 as the Fujian Marine Fleet was one of Qing China's four regional fleets during the closing decades of the nineteenth century. The fleet was almost annihilated on 23 August 1884 by French Admiral Amédée Courbet's Far East Squadron at the Battle of Fuzhou, the opening engagement of the Sino-French War.

== Composition ==
The Fujian Fleet, which would be the main target of the French attack in August 1884, was considerably weaker than the Beiyang Fleet and the Nanyang Fleet, though slightly stronger than the Guangdong Fleet. Nearly all of its ships were elderly products of the Foochow Navy Yard. Its flagship, the wooden corvette Yangwu, was built in 1872. The other Chinese-built ships included the wooden gunboats Fuxing and Zhenwei (1870 and 1872), the wooden transports Fupo, Feiyun, Ji'an, Yongbao and Chenhang (all built in 1874 or earlier), and the despatch vessel Yixin. The fleet also included two British-built ships, the 256-ton Rendel 'flatiron' gunboats Jiansheng and Fusheng, which had been ordered by the southern trade commissioner Shen Baozhen in the wake of the Japanese incursion into southern Taiwan in 1874 and were built at Laird's yard in Birkenhead in 1875.

Table 1: Ships of the Fujian Fleet (listed according to date of construction)

Name (pinyin)	Name (Wade Giles)	Characters	Type	Construction	Specifications
Fuxing	Fu-hsing	福星	wooden gunboat	1870, Foochow Navy Yard	515 tons, 3 guns
Zhenwei	Chen-wei	振威	wooden gunboat	1872, Foochow Navy Yard	572.5 tons, 10 knots, 6 guns
Fupo	Fu-p'o	伏波	scout-transport	1870, Foochow Navy Yard	1,258 tons, 5 guns
Feiyun	Fei-yun	飛雲	scout-transport	1872, Foochow Navy Yard	1,258 tons, 13 knots, 5 Prussian breechloaders
Yangwu	Yang-wu	揚武	wooden corvette	1872, Foochow Navy Yard	1,393 tons, 15 knots, 13 British muzzle-loaders
Ji'an	Chi-an	濟安	scout-transport	1873, Foochow Navy Yard	1,258 tons, 12 knots, 5 guns
Yongbao	Yung-pao	永保	scout-transport	1873, Foochow Navy Yard	1,391 tons, 3 guns
Chenhang	Ch'en-hang	琛航	scout-transport	1874, Foochow Navy Yard	1,391 tons, 3 guns
Jiansheng	Chien-sheng	建勝	Rendel flatiron gunboat	1875, Laird, Birkenhead	250 tons
Fusheng	Fu-sheng	福勝	Rendel flatiron gunboat	1875, Laird, Birkenhead	280 tons
Yixin	I-hsin	藝新	river patrol boat	1876, Foochow Navy Yard	No details available
Henghai	Heng-hai	橫海	composite sloop	1885, Foochow Navy Yard	Details to follow
Fujing	Fu-ching	福靖	steel torpedo boat	1893, Foochow Navy Yard	2,200 tons, 17 knots, two 8-in Armstrong guns, 8 quickfirers
Fu An	Fu-An	福安	composite cruiser	1894, Foochow Navy Yard	3,100 tons, 380' length 14 knots, two 6.3-in Armstrong guns, 4 6-in guns

== The Battle of Fuzhou ==
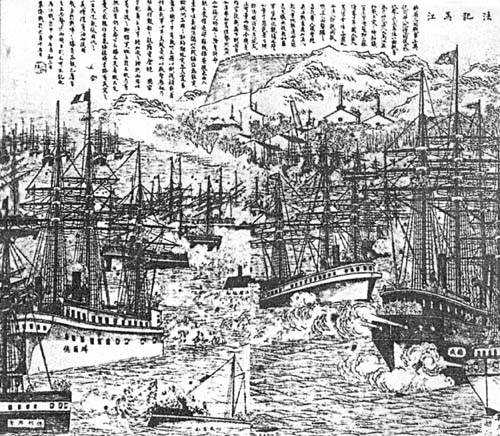
Chinese lithograph of the Battle of Fuzhou

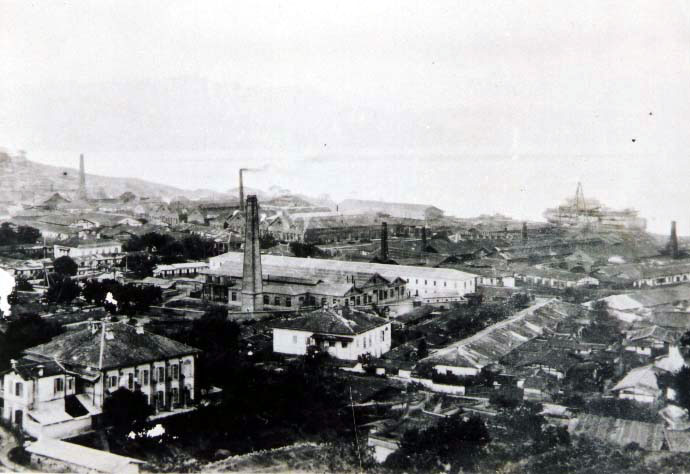
The Foochow Arsenal, where most of the Fujian Fleet's ships were built

Nine of the eleven vessels of the Fujian Fleet were destroyed in less than an hour during the Battle of Fuzhou (23 August 1884). The Chinese flagship Yangwu was successfully attacked with a spar torpedo and grounded. The despatch vessel Fuxing was also attacked, less successfully, with spar torpedoes, and was finally carried by boarding. She had already been set alight by French shellfire, and was eventually abandoned by the French prize crew and sank in the middle of the Min River. Zhenwei was blown up by a single shell from the ironclad Triomphante, which joined the French squadron minutes before the battle began. Chenhang, Yongbao, Feiyun, Ji'an, Fusheng and Jiansheng were either sunk or set alight by shellfire from the cruisers Duguay-Trouin, Villars and d'Estaing. Only Fupo and Yixin survived the battle without serious damage, by escaping upriver before the French ships had a chance to engage them.

== Fleet acquisitions after 1885 ==
The Fujian Fleet never recovered from the loss of most of its ships in the Sino-French War. During the following decade it acquired several new ships, but it was never as large again as it was in 1884. The composite sloop Henghai (橫海) was completed at the Foochow Navy Yard in late 1885 and entered service with the Fujian Fleet. The sloop, which had been lying on the slips at the Foochow Navy Yard in August 1884, had been holed by French gunfire in the Battle of Fuzhou (23 August 1884), but the Chinese seem to have repaired the damage rapidly. Henghai served with the Fujian Fleet for less than a year. She ran aground off the Pescadores Islands on 30 March 1886 in thick fog, and broke up several days later during a gale after efforts by the warships Fupo (伏波) and Wannianqing (萬年清) to refloat her had failed.

In 1893 the 2,200-ton steel torpedo boat Fujing (福靖) was completed at the Foochow Navy Yard and joined the Fujian Fleet. She was sent north during the Sino-Japanese War to assist the Beiyang Fleet, but returned to Fujian in 1896 without having seen action. She sank in a storm near Port Arthur in 1898.

== Ships of the Fujian Fleet ==
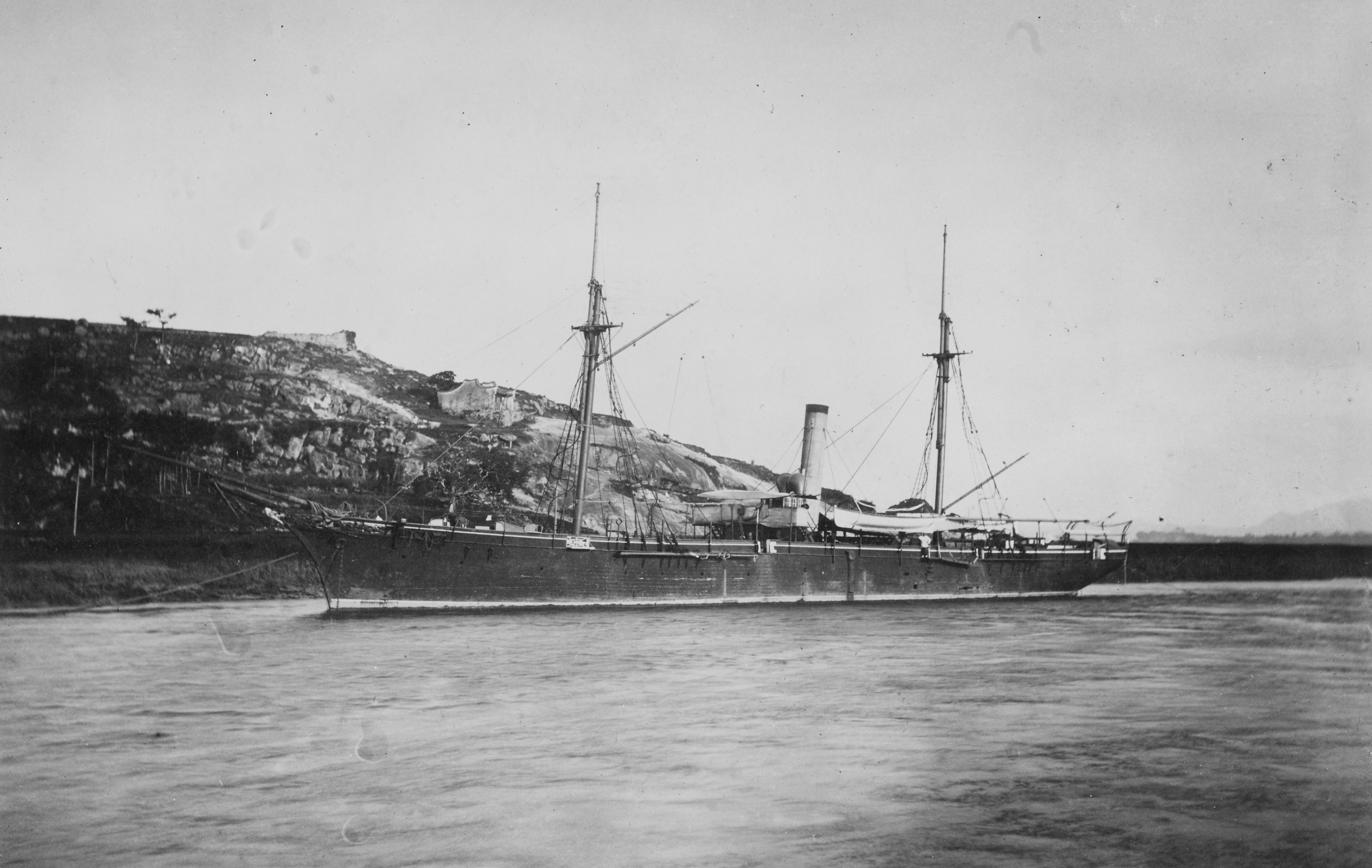
Fupo (伏波)

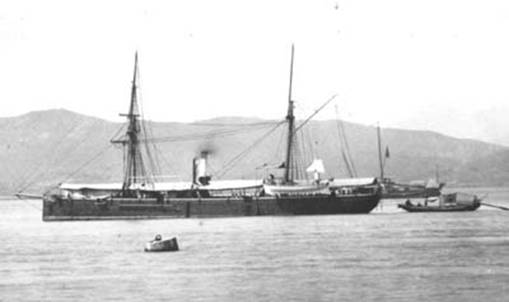
Fuxing (福星)

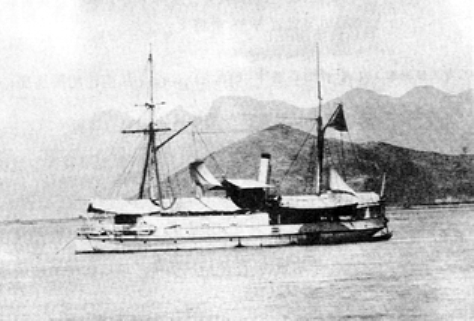
Jiansheng (建勝)

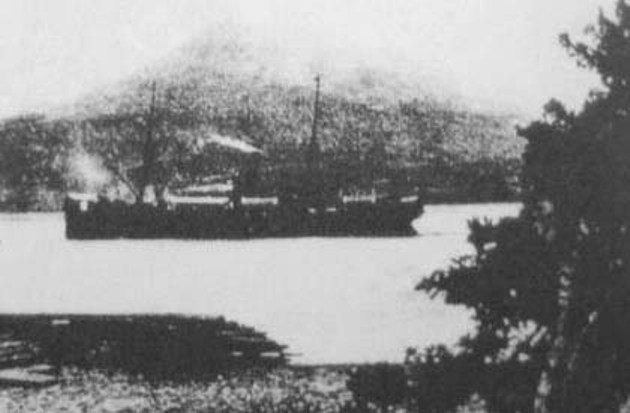
Yixin (藝新)
