= Prosper Giquel =

French naval officer

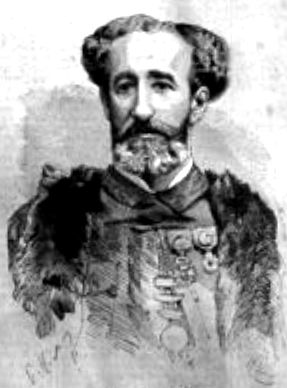
- Prosper Giquel (1835-1886).
- Nicknames: 日意格 (pinyin: Rì Yìgé)
- Born: 20 November 1835
- Died: 19 February 1886 (aged 50)
- Allegiance: France
- Branch: French Navy

Prosper Marie Giquel (20 November 1835 – 19 February 1886) was a French naval officer who played an important role in the modernization of 19th century China. His Chinese name was 日意格 (pinyin: Rì Yìgé).

== Career ==
Prosper Giquel first arrived in China in 1857 as part of the allied assault forces of the Arrow War. Taking the opportunity that service in the Guangzhou (Canton) occupation force allowed, Giquel began the study of Chinese. In late 1861 he joined the Imperial Maritime Customs Service under Robert Hart, as the director of the Ningbo office and remained there until the city was captured by the forces of the Taiping Rebellion in December 1861. He was again the Commissioner of Customs for Ningbo in 1864.

=== Taiping Rebellion ===
After spending the following spring working in the coordinated French and English campaign to drive the rebels from Shanghai, Giquel returned to Ningbo to organize the force which eventually became the Ever Victorious Army, also known as the "Franco-Chinese force". The force numbered between 2,000 and 3,000 men. On 15 March 1863, the force, under the command of Ensign Paul d'Aiguebelle captured the city of Shaoxing from the Taiping rebels. Giquel took command of the "Franco-Chinese force" when d'Aiguebelle returned to France, but the force was soon dissolved in October 1864, in agreement with Zuo Zongtang.

=== Fuzhou Arsenal ===
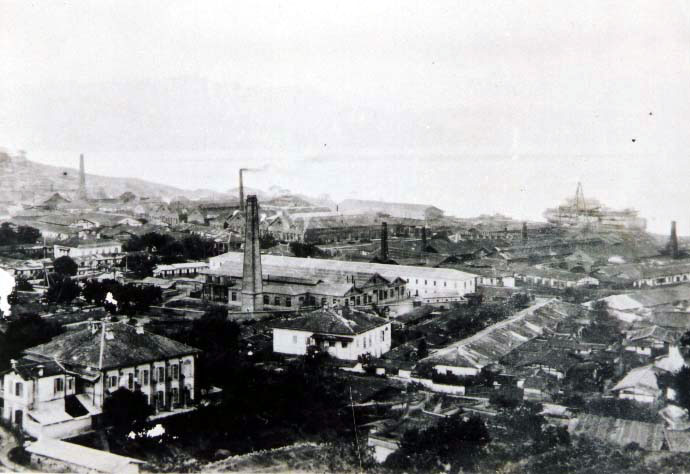
Prosper Giquel supervised the building of the Fuzhou Arsenal in Mawei.

In 1866 Giquel became involved in the organization and planning for the Fuzhou dockyard project envisioned by Zuo Zongtang. From 1867 to 1874 he served as European director of the project which Shen Baozhen, as the imperial commissioner, headed. The objective of the dockyard was to create a modern Chinese fleet of warships and transports, and to educated technicians in Western sciences. These efforts contributed to China's Self-Strengthening Movement of acquiring Western knowledge. Similarly, the Nanjing Arsenal was put under the responsibility of the Englishman Halliday Macartney.

Having completed his direct administration of the project by 1874, Giquel continued to serve the dockyard by working as a consultant, purchasing agent, and co-director of the European Educational Mission in 1877. The educational mission's goal was to provide advanced technical training to complement the dockyard's instructional program.

In the mid-1870s and 1880s Giquel became increasingly involved in international diplomacy. He first served as an adviser during the "Taiwan crisis", a diplomatic clash between Japan and China in 1874 culminating with Japan's invasion of the island. In 1881 he helped Zeng Jize peacefully conclude the "III crisis" between China and Russia. Giquel spent his last years (1883–1885) struggling to help end the Sino-French War, which had broken out due to conflicting Sino-French claims to Indochina. Among the traumatic events of that period, certainly for Prosper Giquel, was the August 1884 destruction by the French Navy of the Fuzhou Dockyard, the principal accomplishment of his entire career in China, in the Battle of Fuzhou.

== Legacy ==
Prosper Giquel appears as a character in Li Bo's Tienkuo: The Heavenly Kingdom an historical novel set in the middle of the 19th century as well as the same author's Beyond the Heavenly Kingdom.

== Works ==
- Journal of the Chinese Civil War
- The Foochow Arsenal, and Its Results, from the Commencement in 1867, to the End of the Foreign Directorate, on the 16th February, 1874.
