= Foochow Arsenal =

Shipyard in Fuzhou, China

Coordinates: 25.993°N 119.460°E

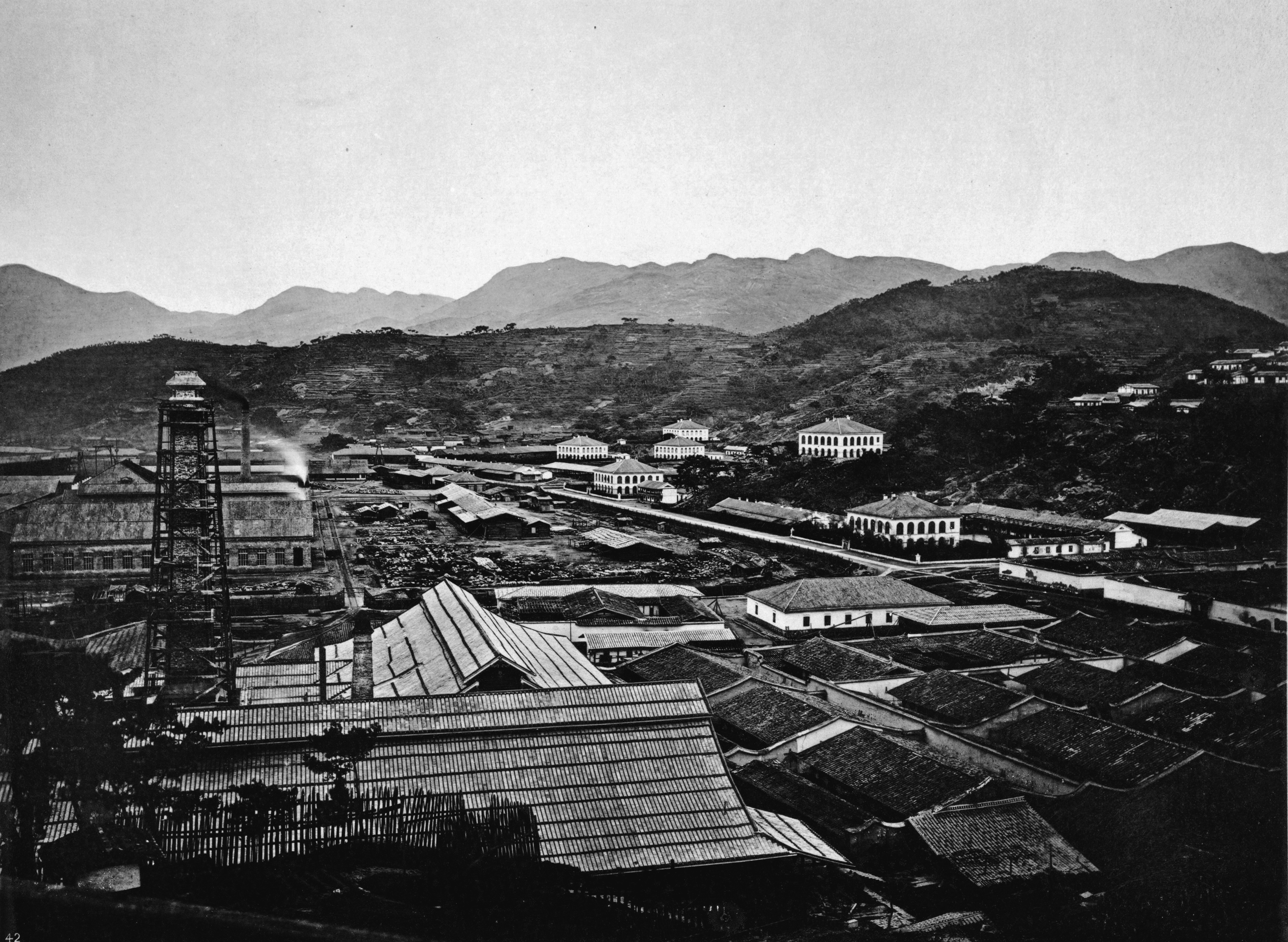
- Foochow Arsenal (1870s)
- Traditional Chinese: 福州造船廠
- Simplified Chinese: 福州造船厂
- Literal meaning: Fuzhou Shipyard
Transcriptions
Standard Mandarin
- Hanyu Pinyin: Fúzhōu Zàochuánchǎng
- Wade–Giles: Fu-chou Tsao-ch'uan-ch'ang

Mawei Arsenal
- Traditional Chinese: 馬尾造船廠
- Simplified Chinese: 马尾造船厂
- Literal meaning: Mawei Shipyard
Transcriptions
Standard Mandarin
- Hanyu Pinyin: Mǎwěi Zàochuánchǎng
- Wade–Giles: Ma-wei Tsao-ch'uan-ch'ang

The Foochow Arsenal, also known as the Fuzhou or Mawei Arsenal, was one of several shipyards created by the Qing Empire and a flagship project of French assistance to China during the Self-Strengthening Movement. The shipyard was constructed under orders from Li Hongzhang and Zuo Zongtang and was situated in Mawei (simplified Chinese: 马尾; traditional Chinese: 馬尾, romanized as Mamoi in that period), a port town within the jurisdiction of Fuzhou fu (then romanized as "Foochow"), which is several miles up the Min River.

== History ==
Planning for the shipyard, the Fuzhou Naval College (t 船政學堂, s 船政学堂, p Chuánzhèng Xuétáng, w Ch'uan-cheng Hsüeh-t'ang), and other facilities began in 1866. Construction began in 1867. Two French Naval officers, Prosper Giquel and Paul d'Aiguebelle, both on leave from the French Imperial Navy, were contracted to recruit a staff of about forty European engineers and mechanics, and to oversee the construction of a metal-working forge, the creation of a Western-style naval dockyard, the construction of eleven transports and five gunboats, and the establishment of schools for training in navigation and marine engineering—all within a five-year period. Chinese authorities provided the materials and labour, with the number of labourers rising from an initial figure of 1,600 to more than 2,000 by 1872. The operating cost over five years was estimated at 3 million taels of silver, and the cost of maintenance of the ships produced was partly funded by revenue from duties on the import of opium. The first ship produced at the Arsenal, the 150-horsepower Qing Forever (t 萬年清, s 万年清, p Wànnián Qīng, w Wan-nien Ch'ing), was launched in June 1869.

The shipyard was severely damaged by French forces in 1884 during the Sino-French War of 1883–1885, in the battle of Fuzhou. A modern shipyard was later rebuilt on the site.

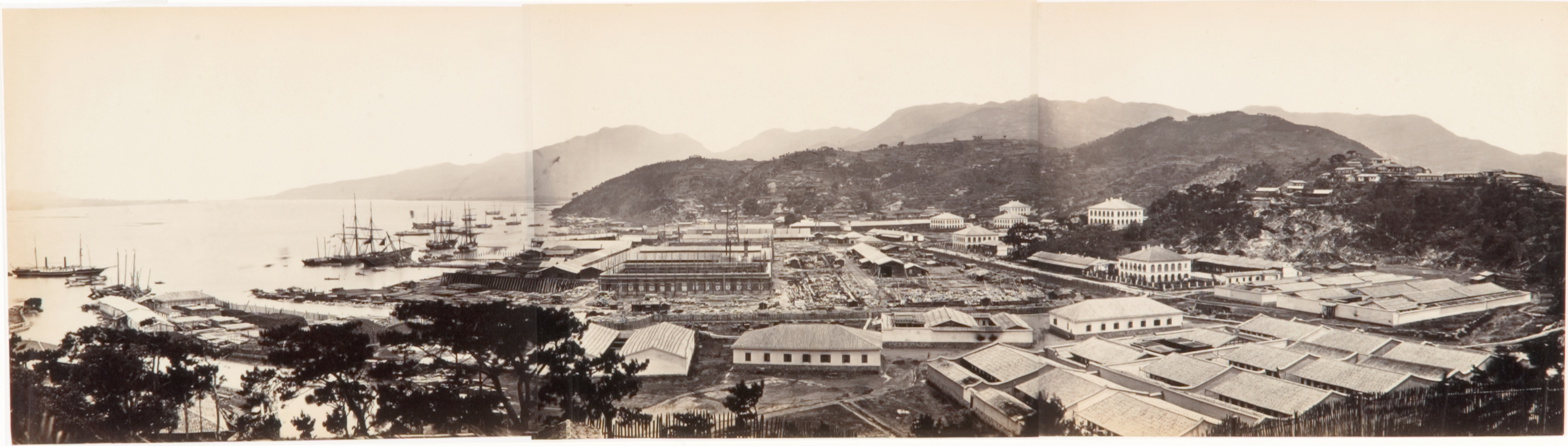
The Foochow Arsenal under construction, between 1867 and 1871. Three albumen prints joined to form a panorama.

== See also ==
- Chen Jitong, shipbuilder and diplomat trained at the Foochow Arsenal
- Hanyang Arsenal
- Taiyuan Arsenal
- Great Hsi-Ku Arsenal
- Jiangnan Shipyard
- Shen Baozhen, Qing minister worked in Foochow Arsenal
