= Cup of Solid Gold =

National anthem of Qing China (1911–1912)

Gǒng jīn'ōu
English: Cup of Solid Gold
- 鞏金甌
- Sheet music in Gongche notation
- Former national anthem of China
- Lyrics: Yan Fu
- Music: Bo Tong
- Adopted: 4 October 1911
- Relinquished: 12 February 1912

Audio sample
- Cup of Solid Gold: file; help

Cup of Solid Gold
- Traditional Chinese: 鞏金甌
- Simplified Chinese: 巩金瓯
Transcriptions
Standard Mandarin
- Hanyu Pinyin: Gǒng jīn'ōu
- Wade–Giles: Kung^{3} Chin^{1}-ou^{1}
- IPA: [kʊ̀ŋ tɕín.óʊ]

"Cup of Solid Gold" (traditional Chinese: 鞏金甌; simplified Chinese: 巩金瓯; pinyin: Gǒngjīn'ōu) was the first official national anthem of China, adopted by the Qing dynasty (1644–1912) on 4 October 1911. The title references the "golden cup," a ritual instrument that symbolized the empire. The anthem was never performed publicly; the Wuchang Uprising started six days later and the dynasty ended with the 1911 Revolution.

== Background ==
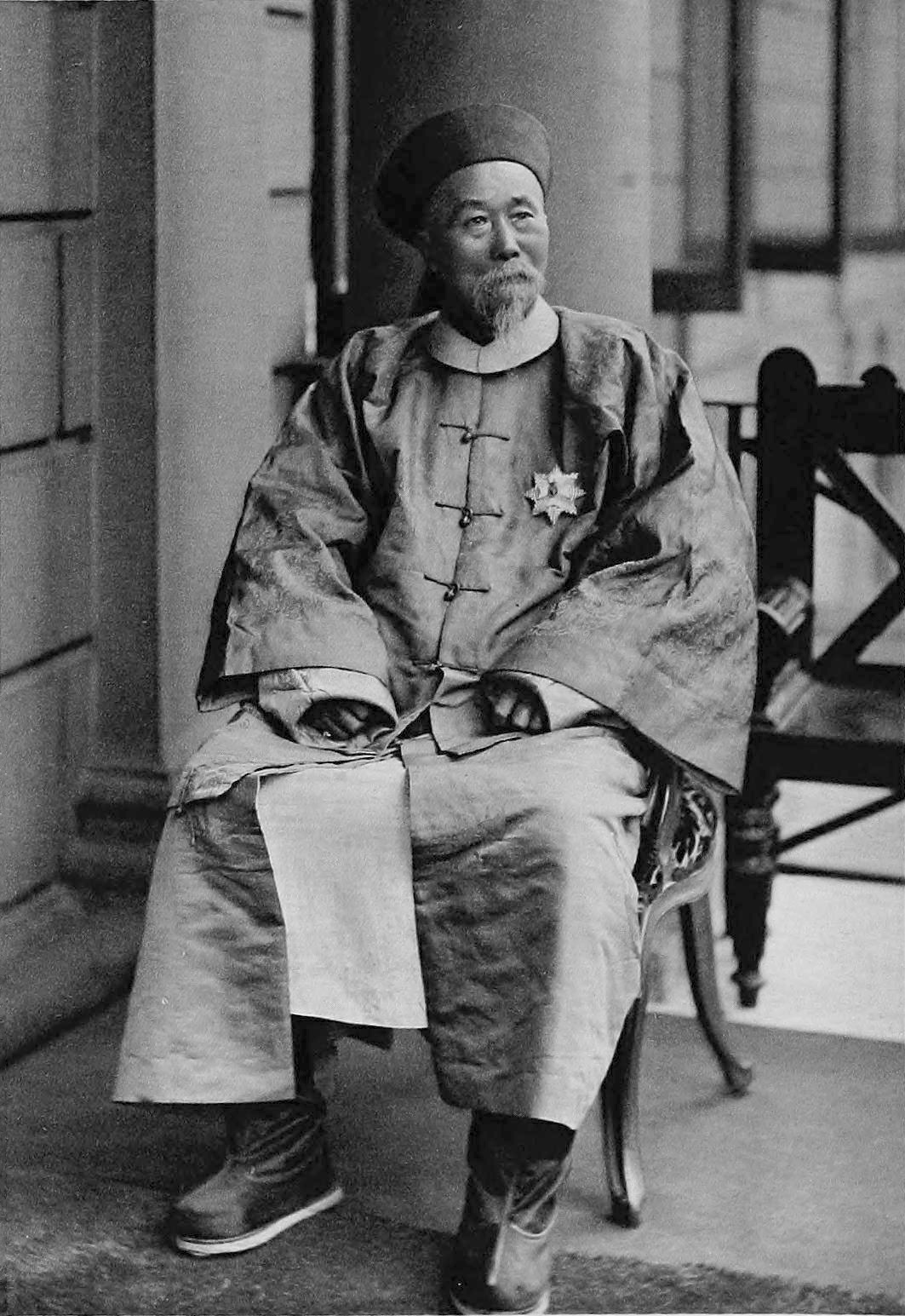
Li Hongzhang arranged a Tang dynasty (618–907) poem to ceremonial music to serve as China's unofficial anthem during his visit to Europe in 1896.

Dynasties in Chinese history used music for various ceremonies, but never had official anthems representing the country, state, or dynasty. By the end of the nineteenth century, however, Qing China was constantly in contact with foreign countries and started to require a national anthem "for diplomatic convenience".

Qing diplomats were one of the first to suggest adopting an official anthem. Zeng Jize (1839–1890) – eldest son of statesman Zeng Guofan – was the Qing envoy to France, Britain, and Russia for several years starting in 1878. Around 1880, he composed a song called Pu Tian Yue to be played as China's anthem in various state ceremonies and suggested the Qing adopt it as its official anthem, but the court did not approve. That song's lyrics and melody have both been lost for a very long time. However, an instrumental version of the anthem has been found and a part of what is seemingly the lyrics.

When Li Hongzhang (1823–1901) visited Western Europe and Russia in 1896 as a special envoy charged with learning about foreign institutions after the disastrous end of the Sino–Japanese War in 1895, he was again asked to provide China's national anthem for performance at state receptions. He hastily adapted some court music to a slightly modified jueju poem by Tang dynasty (618–907) poet Wang Jian and presented that song as the Qing anthem. That song later became known as the Tune of Li Zhongtang, but was never officially recognized as a national anthem.

Another unofficial anthem was written for the new Qing ground forces that were established in 1906. Entitled Praise the Dragon Flag, it was played on ceremonial occasions, but like the songs promoted by Zeng Jize and Li Hongzhang, was never officially adopted as the Qing national anthem.

A Chinese version of the Japanese national anthem Kimigayo (adopted by the Meiji regime in 1888) was played in the new-style schools that taught modern topics like science and engineering. The Chinese lyrics – "To unify old territories, our ancient Asian country of four thousand years sighs in sorrow for the Jews, India, and Poland. Reading the history of those who have lost their countries, we shiver in our hearts!" – emphasized the Social Darwinist themes of ethnic crisis and loss of national territory, but many considered these too far from the usual themes of ceremonial music to be acceptable.

== The Cup of Solid Gold ==
On 25 January 1911, an official from the Ministry of Rites called Cao Guangquan (曹廣權／曹广权) petitioned the Qing court to adopt a stately "national music" (guoyue 國樂／国乐) that could be performed at court ceremonies. He proposed that officials collect both ancient music and examples of state music from abroad and, on that basis, design an anthem for the Qing. The Ceremonial Council (Dianliyuan 典禮院／典礼院), which had just replaced the Ministry of Rites, responded on 15 July of that year. It put Bo Tong (溥侗) (1877–1950) — a Manchu noble and direct descendant of the Daoguang Emperor who served in the Imperial Guard — in charge of writing the melody, whereas Yan Fu (1854–1921), a translator of European scientific and philosophical treatises and an advisor to the Qing Navy, was charged with writing the lyrics. Guo Cengxin (郭曾炘), who had worked for the Ministry of Rites, made some minor modifications at the end.

The Qing government adopted Gong Jin'ou as its national anthem on 4 October 1911. The edict announcing the new anthem, and sometimes even the anthem's music and lyrics, were published in newspapers, and the court instructed the Navy and Army to practice the song, which was also transmitted to China's ambassadors throughout the world. However, the Wuchang Uprising took place on October 10 (six days after the anthem was promulgated) and quickly led to the fall of the dynasty. The foundation of the Republic of China was announced for 1 January 1912, and the last Qing emperor officially abdicated a little more than a month later. Gong Jin'ou was never performed publicly.

=== Title ===
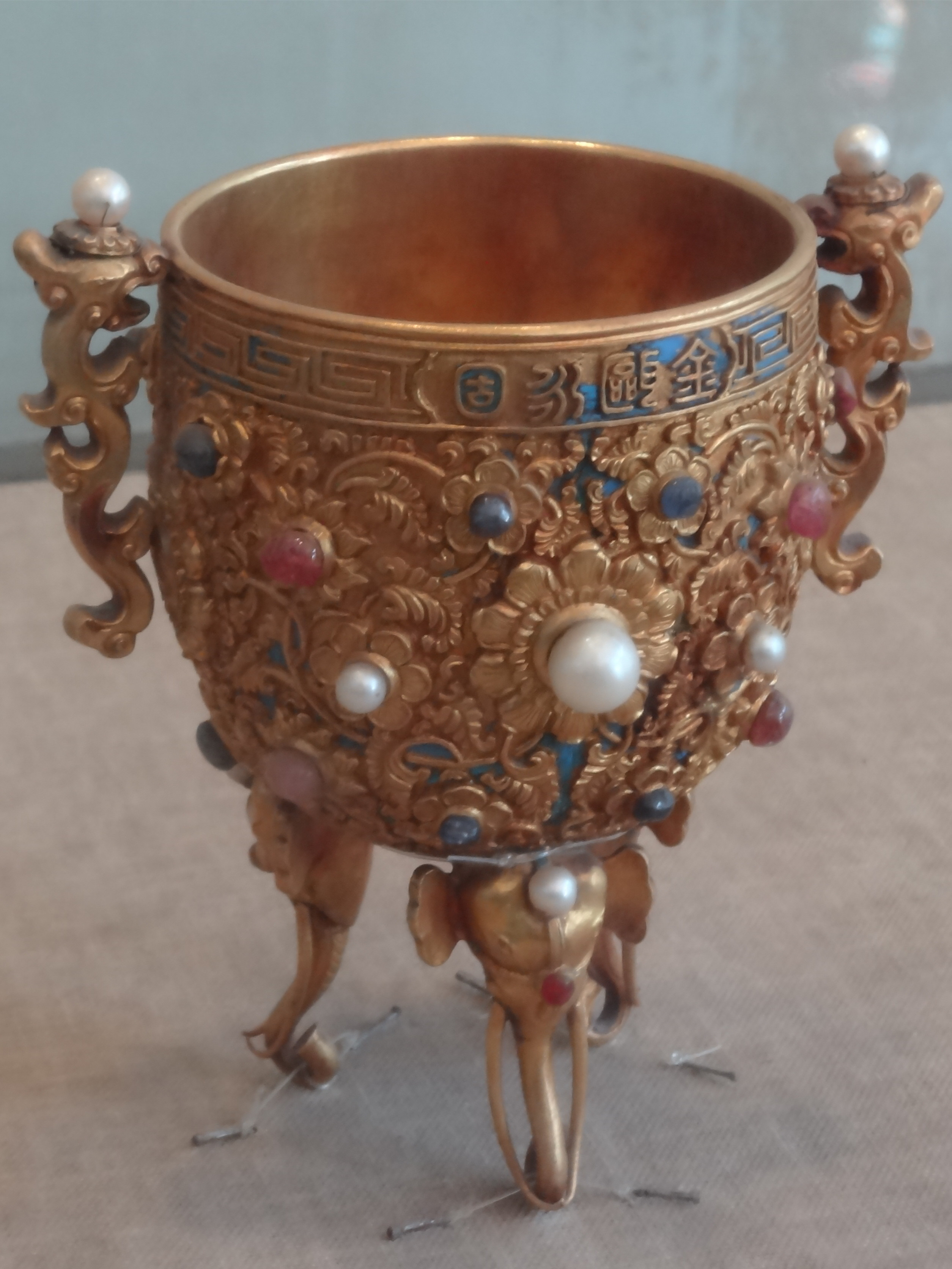
Cup of Eternal Solid Gold, preserved in the Palace Museum

Ou (甌) was a kind of wine vessel. Jin'ou (金甌／金瓯), or golden wine vessel, symbolized an "indestructible country". The Qing emperor used such a vessel for ritual purposes. Inlaid with pearls and gems, it was known as the "Cup of Eternal Solid Gold" (Jin'ou Yonggu Bei 金甌永固杯). Because gong 鞏 means "to consolidate" or "to strengthen," the entire title may be translated as "strengthening our hold on the golden cup."

Yan Fu, who wrote the lyrics, glossed the title and first line of the anthem as "Firm and stable be the 'golden cup' (which means the empire)."

=== Music ===
The person who was nominally put in charge of the anthem's music was Bo Tong, an imperial relative. Aided by assistants in the Imperial Guard, he composed the music based on the models found in the Complement to the Treatise on Pitch Pipes (Lülü Zhengyi Houbian 律呂正義後編／律吕正义后编; 1746), an imperial compilation that complemented a much shorter 1724 work on ceremonial music commissioned by the Kangxi Emperor.

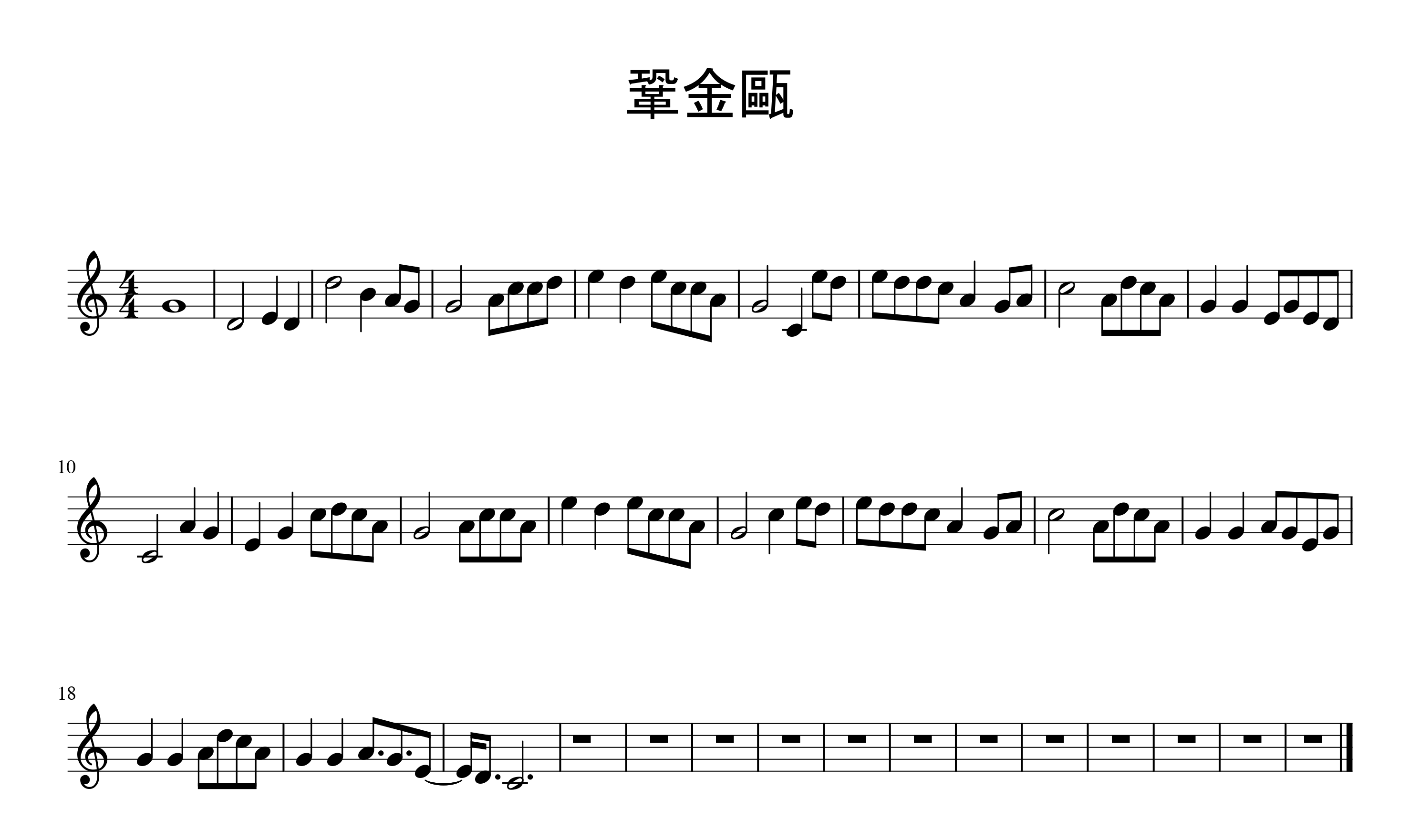
European notation

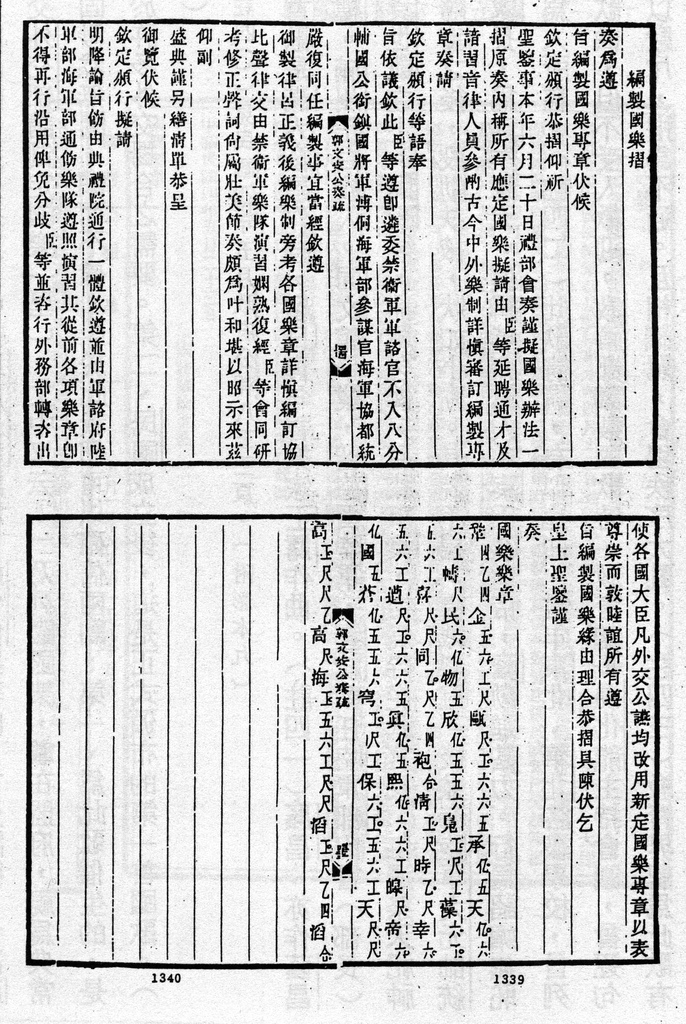
Government document with Gongche notation

=== Lyrics ===
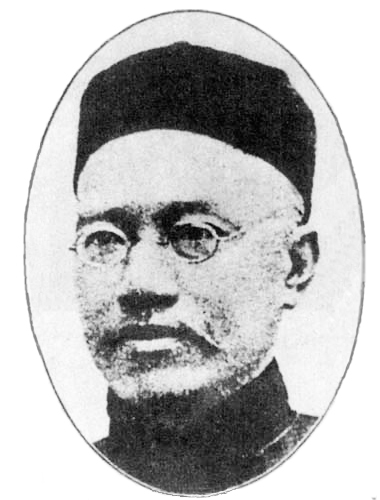
Yan Fu, the scholar and naval advisor who composed lyrics.

The lyrics, composed by Yan Fu, are in Classical Chinese.

Traditional Chinese

鞏金甌，
承天幬，
民物欣鳧藻，
喜同袍。
清時幸遭，
真熙皞，
帝國蒼穹保。
天高高，
海滔滔。

Simplified Chinese

巩金瓯，
承天帱，
民物欣凫藻，
喜同袍。
清时幸遭,
真熙皞，
帝国苍穹保。
天高高，
海滔滔。

Hanyu Pinyin

Gǒng Jīn'ōu
Chéng tiān chóu,
Mínwù xīn fúzǎo,
Xǐ tóng páo.
Qīng shí xìngzāo,
Zhēn xī hào,
Dìguó cāngqióng bǎo.
Tiān gāogāo,
Hǎi tāotāo.

IPA transcription

[kʊ̀ŋ t͡ɕín.óʊ̯]
[ʈ͡ʂʰɤ̌ŋ tʰjɛ́n ʈ͡ʂʰǒʊ̯]
[mǐn.û ɕín fǔ.t͡sɑ̀ʊ̯]
[ɕì tʰʊ̌ŋ pʰɑ̌ʊ̯]
[t͡ɕʰíŋ ʂɻ̩̌ ɕîŋ.t͡sɑ́ʊ̯]
[ʈ͡ʂə́n ɕí xɑ̂ʊ̯]
[tî.kwǒ t͡sʰɑ́ŋ.t͡ɕʰjʊ̌ŋ pɑ̀ʊ̯]
[tʰjɛ́n kɑ́ʊ̯.kɑ́ʊ̯]
[xàɪ̯ tʰɑ́ʊ̯.tʰɑ́ʊ̯]

English translation

Solidify our golden empire,
Follow the will of Heaven,
All of creation will celebrate,
All of mankind will be filled with happiness.
As long as the Qing rules,
May the enlightened empire,
And its vast boundaries be protected.
The sky is high,
The sea is turbulent.

In the second line, tian chou 天幬／天帱 (literally, the "canopy of Heaven") referred to the Mandate of Heaven, which a legitimate dynasty was supposed to represent. Tongpao 同袍 (lit., "sharing the same robes"), an allusion to a verse in the Book of Poetry, meant "sharing the same goals and loyalties" or being part of the same army. In modern transcriptions of the lyrics, that phrase is often miswritten as tongbao 同胞 ("compatriot"), a term with racial connotations that the Manchu nobles who ruled Qing China purposely wanted to avoid.

Answering a request transmitted by George Ernest Morrison, on 16 March 1912 Yan Fu wrote to British Foreign Secretary Edward Grey to explain the Qing anthem, and ended his letter with a rough translation of the lyrics:

Firm and Stable be the "golden cup" (which means the empire) domed by the Celestial concave. In it, men and things happily prosper. Glad are we who live in the time of Purity. May Heaven protect and secure us from enemies and help us to reach the truly golden age! Oh! The Blue firmament is infinitely high and the seas flow everlastingly.

The character qīng 清 that Yan rendered as "Purity" was also the name of the Qing dynasty.

== Bibliography ==
- Rhoads, Edward J. M. (2000), Manchus & Han: Ethnic Relations and Political Power in Late Qing and Early Republican China 1861–1928, Seattle and London: University of Washington Press, ISBN 978-0-295-97938-0.
- Qian 钱, Renkang 仁康 (2010), World National Anthem Encyclopedia New Edition 新编世界国歌博览, Shanghai: Shanghai Music Publishing House 上海音乐出版社, ISBN 978-7-807-51549-4.
- Ye, Xiaoqing 葉小青 (2006), "Da Qing guo de guoge 大清國的國歌 [The Qing National Anthem]", Xun Gen (尋根), 2006 (3): 90–91, doi:10.3969/j.issn.1005-5258.2006.03.010, archived from the original on 6 September 2017.
- ——— (2012), Ascendant Peace in the Four Seas: Drama and the Qing Imperial Court, Hong Kong: The Chinese University of Hong Kong Press, ISBN 978-962-996-457-3.
- ———; Eccles, Lance (2007), "Anthem for a Dying Dynasty: The Qing National Anthem through the Eyes of a Court Musician", T'oung Pao, 93 (4/5): 433–58, doi:10.1163/008254307x246946, JSTOR 40376331.

Preceded by Various unofficial tunes	"Cup of Solid Gold"; 1911–1912	Succeeded by "Song to the Auspicious Cloud" (1912–1928)
