= Cheng Biguang =

Chinese admiral

- 程璧光
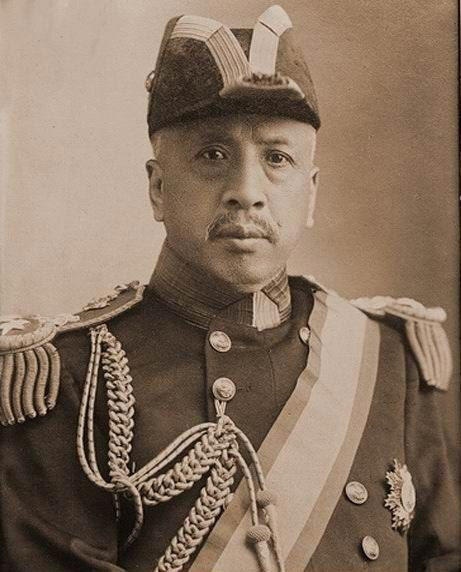

Minister of Navy
- In office 30 June 1916 – 24 June 1917
- Preceded by: Liu Guanxiong
- Succeeded by: Sa Zhenbing

Personal details
- Born: 1861 Xiangshan County, Guangdong, Qing China
- Died: February 26, 1918 (aged 56–57) Haizhu District, Guangzhou, Guangdong, Republic of China
- Awards: Order of Wen-Hu

Military service
- Allegiance: Qing Dynasty (Republic of China (1912–1949)) Republic of China
- Branch/service: Imperial Chinese Navy; Republic of China Navy
- Commands: Admiral
- Battles/wars: First Sino-Japanese War

Cheng Biguang (pinyin: Chéng Bìguāng; Jyutping: Cing^{4} Bik^{1}gwong^{1}) (1861－26 February 1918) was a Chinese admiral during the late Qing dynasty and later the Republic of China. He served in the Beiyang Fleet and the Republic of China Navy. When Duan Qirui refused to validate the Constitution, Cheng and fellow Admiral Lin Baoyi sailed their fleets to Guangzhou join the Constitutional Protection Movement led by Sun Yat-sen. He was assassinated in Haizhu District, Guangzhou, in 1918.

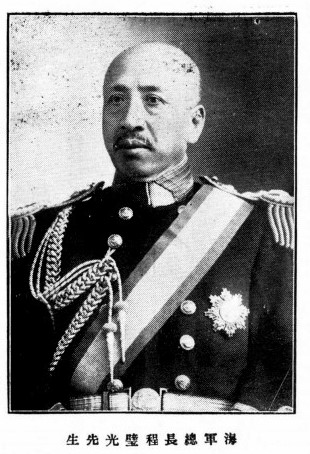
Cheng Biguang

Military offices
Preceded by Liu Guanxiong	Minister of Navy of the Republic of China; 1916-1917	Succeeded by Sa Zhenbing
