= Hǎi Qí =

Hǎi Qí may refer to:

- Jiang Haiqi, a Chinese Olympic swimmer
- Chinese cruiser Hǎi Qí, a protected cruiser in the Chinese fleet
- Hǎi Qí class cruiser, a pair of protected cruisers
