= Guoge =

Guoge is may refer to:

- "The March of the Volunteers", long the provisional and since 1982 the official national anthem of the People's Republic of China
- The National Anthem of the Republic of China
- The National Anthem (film), a 1999 film about the composition of "The March of the Volunteers"
- "The East Is Red" (song), an unofficial anthem during the late 1960s and early 1970s amid the PRC's Cultural Revolution
- Other historical Chinese anthems
- Other countries' national anthems
