= 甌 =

甌 can refer to:

- Jian'ou
- Dong'ou
  - Wenzhou, modern city on the Dong'ou location
- Cup of Solid Gold (鞏金甌), national anthem of the Qing dynasty
- Âu Lạc
