= Chinese cruiser Hai Tien =

Chinese ship

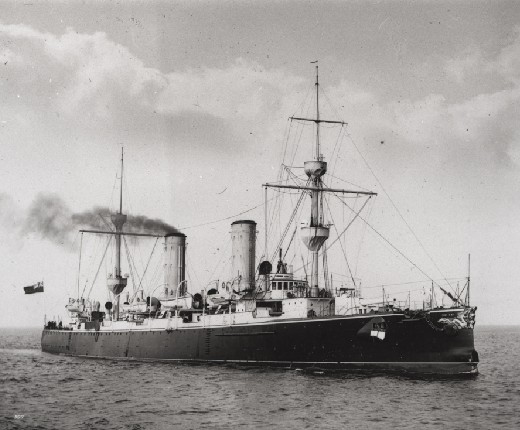
- Hai Tien before her handover to China, 1897

History

Imperial China
- Name: Hai Tien (海天)
- Builder: Armstrong Whitworth
- Cost: £336,659
- Laid down: 16 February 1897
- Launched: 25 November 1897
- Completed: 28 March 1899
- Acquired: August 1899
- Maiden voyage: 22 May 1899
- Homeport: Shanghai
- Fate: Foundered 25 April 1904

General characteristics
- Class & type: Hai Chi-class protected cruiser
- Displacement: 4,300 tons (standard); 4,515 t (full load)
- Length: 129.2 m (423 ft 11 in) o/a
- Beam: 14.2 m (46 ft 7 in)
- Draught: 5.45 m (17 ft 11 in)
- Propulsion: 2 shafts, 4 Hawthorn Leslie VTE engines, 12-cylindrical boilers, 17,000 bhp (12,700 kW)
- Speed: 24.15 knots (27.79 mph; 44.73 km/h)
- Range: 8,000 nmi (15,000 km) at 'economical speed'
- Complement: 400
- Armament: 2 × 203.2-millimetre (8.00 in)/45 (1 × 1); 10 × 120 mm (5 in)/45 (1 × 1); 16 × 47 mm (2 in)/40 (16 × 1); 5 × 450 mm (18 in) torpedo tubes (1 × 1 bow, 4 × 1 stern)
- Armour: Deck: 37–127 mm (1–5 in); Turrets: 114.3 mm (5 in); Barbettes: 51 mm (2 in); Conning tower: 152 mm (6 in)

Hai Tien (Chinese: 海天; pinyin: Hǎi Tiān; Wade–Giles: Hai Tien; lit. 'Heavenly Sea') was the second ship of the Hai Chi class of protected cruisers and one of the last built for the Manchu Qing dynasty.

== Background ==
In the late 19th century, China, which had been ruled for over two hundred years by the Qing dynasty, was subject to a series of humiliating unequal treaties with foreign powers after a devastating military defeat at the hands of the emerging Empire of Japan. With their armies and navies shattered, China appeared weak to the great powers who were eager to expand their financial and political control over China. In order to rebuild their military and reassert their own national sovereignty, the Qing government appointed the Marquis of Suyi, Li Hongzhang, as a special envoy to Europe in May 1896. Li, a veteran diplomat, was tasked with ordering new warships from foreign dockyards, visiting the Russian Empire, German Empire, Belgium and the United Kingdom throughout summer 1896. A pair of protected cruisers were ordered from Armstrong Whitworth of Newcastle upon Tyne in the United Kingdom as part of this. Hai Tien was ordered along with her sister ship Hai Chi in October 1896, two months after Li's visit to Britain. The two ships were based on an improved Buenos Aires design, which Armstrong Whitworth had built for Argentina a year earlier but made to Chinese dimensional specifications. Hai Tien, although laid down 16 February 1897, three months after Hai Chi, and launched 25 November 1897, two months after Hai Chi's launch, was completed a month ahead of the Hai Chi. Both ships were brought to China by a contract crew, and handed over to the China's Beiyang Fleet in August 1899. Hai Chi and Hai Tien were the largest ships in the Chinese navy until after World War II.

== Service history ==
Hai Tien had a very brief and uneventful career in the Qing Navy. Shortly after the start of Boxer Rebellion which plunged China into chaos, the Beiyang Fleet was sent to reinforce the Dagu forts on 31 May 1900. During this time there was an uneasy state of high alert between the increasing number of foreign warships and the Chinese fleet, although tensions were high no shots were fired between the two sides. Eventually on 16 June 1900, the twenty-three ships of the Eight-Nation Alliance anchored off Dagu made an ultimatum to the fort, demanding its surrender to the allied fleet in order to relieve the Siege of the International Legations in the capital, Beijing. The commanding officer of the forts, General Luo Rongguang refused and opened fire on the foreign ships, leading to the Battle of Dagu Forts. The anti-Boxer governor of Shandong, Yuan Shikai ordered the Beiyang fleet south, in order to prevent the possibility of the outgunned ships from being captured or destroyed by the alliance navies, as had happened to the four new German-built Hai Long-class destroyers and the torpedo gunboat Fei Ting. These five ships were captured by allied forces during the capture of the forts dock facilities. From Dagu, the remains of the Beiyang fleet, which consisted of the protected cruisers Hai Tien, Hai Chou, Hai Chen, and the torpedo gunboat Hai Ying, sailed south to Shanghai and finally to Jiangyin where they quietly stayed for the next year with the Nanyang Fleet until the end of the war on 7 September 1901.

Less than four years later at 5:30 AM on 25 April 1904, Hai Tien under the command of future admiral Liu Guanxiong was sailing to Shanghai from Zhifu when he became engulfed in fog at Weihai. Hai Tien overshot the entrance to the Yangtze River and struck a pinnacle rock just off the Shengsi Islands in Hangzhou Bay. Her crew had abandoned her by the evening and was rescued by passing Chinese customs cruisers. Attempts to salvage the ship failed save for the rescue of her EOC 8 inch 45 caliber guns. This left Hai Chi as the sole surviving member of her class for the rest of her service.
