= Hai Tien =

Hai Tien may refer to:

- Hai Tien, the protagonist of the Hong Kong film Game of Death, played by Bruce Lee
- Chinese cruiser Hai Tien, a protected cruiser in the Chinese fleet
