= Tune of Li Zhongtang =

Lǐ Zhōng táng Yuè
- Tune of Li Zhongtang
- Unofficial anthem of Qing Dynasty
- Lyrics: Wang Jian
- Music: Li Hongzhang, 1896
- Adopted: 1896
- Relinquished: 1906
- Preceded by: Pu Tian Yue
- Succeeded by: Praise the Dragon Flag

Audio sample
- Tune of Li Zhongtang: file; help

Old recording

The Tune of Li Zhongtang (simplified Chinese: 李中堂乐; traditional Chinese: 李中堂樂; pinyin: Lǐ Zhōng táng Yuè) was a semi-official national song of China, written by Li Hongzhang in 1896 during the Qing dynasty. "Zhongtang" was a bureaucratic title held by Li Hongzhang.

== History ==
In 1896 (the 22nd year of Guangxu), Li Hongzhang, Minister of Beiyang and Governor of Zhili, paid a diplomatic visit to Western Europe and Russia. As a national anthem was requested for the welcome ceremony, Li Hongzhang adopted a Tang dynasty poem by Wang Jian for the event.

It shares the same tune with Praise the Dragon Flag.

== Lyrics ==
=== Simplified Chinese ===
金殿当头紫阁重，
仙人掌上玉芙蓉，
太平天子朝天日，
五色云车驾六龙。

=== Traditional Chinese ===
金殿當頭紫閣重，
仙人掌上玉芙蓉，
太平天子朝天日，
五色雲車駕六龍。

=== Hanyu Pinyin ===
Jīndiàn dāng tóu zǐgè chóng,
Xiānrén zhǎng shàng yù fúróng,
Taìpíng Tiānzǐ cháo tiān rì,
Wǔ sè yúnchē jià liù lóng.

=== English translation ===
In the Golden Palace, amongst the overlapping purple pavilions,
Like a jade lotus flower in an immortal's palm,
The Son of Heaven of Supreme Peace pays tribute to Heaven's sun,
In its five-colour chariot of clouds, drawn by six dragons.

== See also ==
- Royal anthem
- Historical Chinese anthems
- Anthem of the Beiyang Fleet
