= Praise the Dragon Flag =

Unofficial Chinese national anthem

The Praise the Dragon Flag (simplified Chinese: 颂龙旗; traditional Chinese: 頌龍旗; pinyin: Sòng Lóng Qí) was a semi-official national anthem of the Qing dynasty, as well as a military and an imperial anthem. It shares the same tune with Tune of Li Zhongtang, the semi-official anthem from 1896 to 1906.

== History ==
In 1906, (the 32nd year of Guangxu), the Department of the Army of the Qing Dynasty was established, and wrote this song as its anthem. The Qing Dynasty also used this song as a semi-official imperial anthem (代國歌).

== Lyrics ==
=== Simplified Chinese ===
于斯万年，亚东大帝国！
山岳纵横独立帜，江河漫延文明波；
四百兆¹民神明冑，地大物产博。
扬我黄龙帝国徽，唱我帝国歌！

=== Traditional Chinese ===
於斯萬年，亞東大帝國！
山嶽縱橫獨立幟，江河漫延文明波；
四百兆¹民神明冑，地大物產博。
揚我黃龍帝國徽，唱我帝國歌！

=== Hanyu Pinyin ===
yú sī wàn nián, yà dōng dà dì guó!
shān yuè zòng héng dú lì zhì, jiāng hé màn yán wén míng bō;
sì bǎi zhào mín shén míng zhòu, dì dà wù chǎn bó.
yáng wǒ huáng lóng dì guó huī, chàng wǒ dì guó gē!

=== English Translation ===
We located here for thousands years as a great empire in East Asia!
Mountains in our land, rivers in our land, spread the culture;
Four hundred million (Note: 兆 usually means one trillion (10^{12}), but it could mean one million (10^{6}), and should have that value here in the song for factual accuracy. See Chinese numerals for details.) people blessed by God, we have a big land and plenty of product.
Raise our Yellow Dragon Emblem Proud, sing our empire's song!

== See also ==
- Historical Chinese anthems
- Personal anthem
