= Beiyang Fleet =

One of the four modernised Chinese navies in the late Qing dynasty

- Ensign of Beiyang Fleet
- Active: 1871–1909
- Country: Qing Empire
- Allegiance: Emperor of China
- Branch: Imperial Chinese Navy
- Garrison/HQ: Weihaiwei
- March: "Anthem of the Beiyang Fleet"
- Engagements: Sino-French War; First Sino-Japanese War

Commanders
- Notable commanders: Li Hongzhang; Ding Ruchang; Sa Zhenbing

The Beiyang Fleet (Pei-yang Fleet; simplified Chinese: 北洋舰队; traditional Chinese: 北洋艦隊; pinyin: Běiyáng Jiànduì; Wade–Giles: Pei^{3}-yang^{2} Chien^{4}-tui^{4}; lit. 'Northern Ocean Fleet', alternatively Northern Seas Fleet) was one of the four modernized Chinese navies in the late Qing dynasty. Among the four, the Beiyang Fleet was particularly sponsored by Li Hongzhang, one of the most trusted vassals of Empress Dowager Cixi and the principal patron of the "self-strengthening movement" in northern China in his capacity as the Viceroy of Zhili and the Minister of Beiyang Commerce (北洋通商大臣). Due to Li's influence in the imperial court, the Beiyang Fleet garnered much greater resources than the other Chinese fleets and soon became the dominant navy in Asia before the onset of the 1894–1895 First Sino-Japanese War. It was the largest fleet in Asia and the 8th largest in the world during the late 1880s in terms of tonnage.

== Creation ==
The creation of the Beiyang Fleet dated back to 1871, when four ships from the southern provinces were shifted north to patrol the northern waters. The Beiyang fleet was initially considered to be the weakest of the four Chinese regional navies. This soon changed when Li Hongzhang allotted the majority of naval funds to the Beiyang Fleet. In 1884, on the eve of the Sino-French War, the Beiyang Fleet was the second-largest regional navy but was gradually closing the gap with the Nanyang Fleet, based at Shanghai. By 1890, it was the largest of China's four regional navies.

Unlike the other Chinese fleets, the Beiyang Fleet consisted mostly of battleships imported from Germany and Great Britain. When the flagships Dingyuan and Zhenyuan were purchased from Germany, the superiority in strength of the Beiyang Fleet became evident, as Germany was the emerging world power, rivalling Britain (which dominated the ocean) in new naval construction.

The Qing Chinese navy at its peak consisted of 78 ships, with a total tonnage of 83,900 tons. However, construction of new ships almost completely stopped in 1888 owing to the Qing dynasty's high expenditures in other fields. Grand Tutor Weng Tonghe advised the Guangxu Emperor to cut all funding to the navy and army, because he did not see Japan as a true threat, and there were several natural disasters during the early 1890s which the emperor thought to be more pressing to expend funds on. Because of the lack of funding, the training of the fleet and personnel essentially came to a standstill, which eventually contributed to its defeat in the Battle of the Yalu River against Japan. Much of the diverted funding was re-directed to the renovation and repairs of the New Summer Palace and construction of a marble boat; a total of $12mil was diverted from the naval fund between 1889 and 1894.

Flag of the Admiral of the Beiyang Fleet

Prior to 1888 the budget of the Beiyang fleet was two million taels. However, in 1888 the Beiyang fleet was formally subordinated to the Navy Yamen (the Qing equivalent to a naval ministry). This saw the budget reduced to 1.3 million taels and in 1891 the Hubu recommended against the purchasing of large guns for the navy and in favour of the reduction of naval personnel. This made any effort of modernisation or even maintenance extremely difficult and meant that many of the Chinese ships went into action in the first Sino-Japanese war in a state of disrepair and unmodernised. The state of disrepair was so acute that when the Dingyuan fired its 10-inch guns at the beginning of the battle of the Yellow Sea its flying bridge flew sending Admiral Ding and Tyler flying along with it.

The British naval officer Captain William Lang was recruited by Hart and Li Hongzhi in 1882 to advise the Chinese in naval matters.

Other foreign officers hired included:

- Constantin von Hanneken, a German gunnery training expert. He was the highest ranked foreign advisor within the fleet who also designed the Weihaiwei and Port Arthur coastal defences. He was appointed co-admiral of the fleet alongside Ding Ruchang.
- William Ferdinand Tyler, a former sub-lieutenant in the Royal Navy Reserves and an official within the Imperial Maritime customs service. Initially an advisor following his volunteering for service he was appointed co-captain of the Dingyuan.
- Philo Norton McGiffin, an American graduate of the U.S. Naval Academy who volunteered for service in China in 1885 as an advisor. Initially an instructor at the Tianjin Naval academy he was appointed superintendent of the new Weihaiwei naval academy in 1890. During the First Sino-Japanese War he was appointed co-captain of the Zhenyuan.

== Personnel ==
The Fuzhou academy in the Fuzhou arsenal established in 1866 produced many naval officers which Li hired for the Beiyang navy. However, the academy also had to provide officers for the other three fleets, and with the academy producing only 630 cadets over a 14-year period, this was insufficient, and Li established the Beiyang naval college in 1880 which produced 300 cadets within the same 14-year period. However, Fuzhou graduates still composed the majority of the graduates in the fleet. Nonetheless, these two academies only provided basic and general naval training which was insufficient for a modern fleet, and so 35 cadets were sent to study in the Royal Naval College Greenwich, Royal Artillery academy Woolwich and others with a more practical assignment in the Royal Navy itself. When these students returned to China they were appointed captains. This meant a minimum of 636 trained cadets in a fleet numbering 4,000.

Senior command of the fleet went to Ding Ruchang, an army officer without any formal training. who was noted for his courage and capability in land affairs. William Lang was appointed as Chief Inspector of the Beiyang navy in 1882 and re-appointed for another term in 1885. Lang resigned following the Flag-hoisting incident, where Beiyang officers refused to hoist the Admiral's flag due to Ding Ruchang's absence. Lang felt insulted when Li did not support him, and resigned in anger.

== Naval bases ==
It was necessary for a modern fleet to possess fortified dockyards and bases for the maintenance and repair of ships of that navy. Li Hongzhang endeavoured therefore to create the necessary support needed for the fleet. The remit of the Beiyang fleet was the protection of the coastal waters between the mouth of the Yalu River and the bay of Jiaozhou a large section of the coastline and an important one as it guarded the Bohai bay and therefore the approaches to Tianjin and the capital Beijing. Li decided to fortify the ports of Lushunkou, Weihaiwei and Tianjin that formed a triangle within the Bohai bay.

=== Tianjin/Dagu ===
This port at the mouth of the Hai river and the port city of the capital Beijing was strategically important and was also the headquarters of the entirety of the Beiyang fleet. The base also hosted the Dagu shipyards, the Tianjin Arsenal, the Tianjin Naval college, the Beiyang Military Academy. The base at Tianjin hosted the telegraph office and academy of the fleet making it important for communication as well as a medical academy and a hospital for naval personnel the torpedo and mining detachments also had their headquarters based in the base.

=== Weihaiwei ===
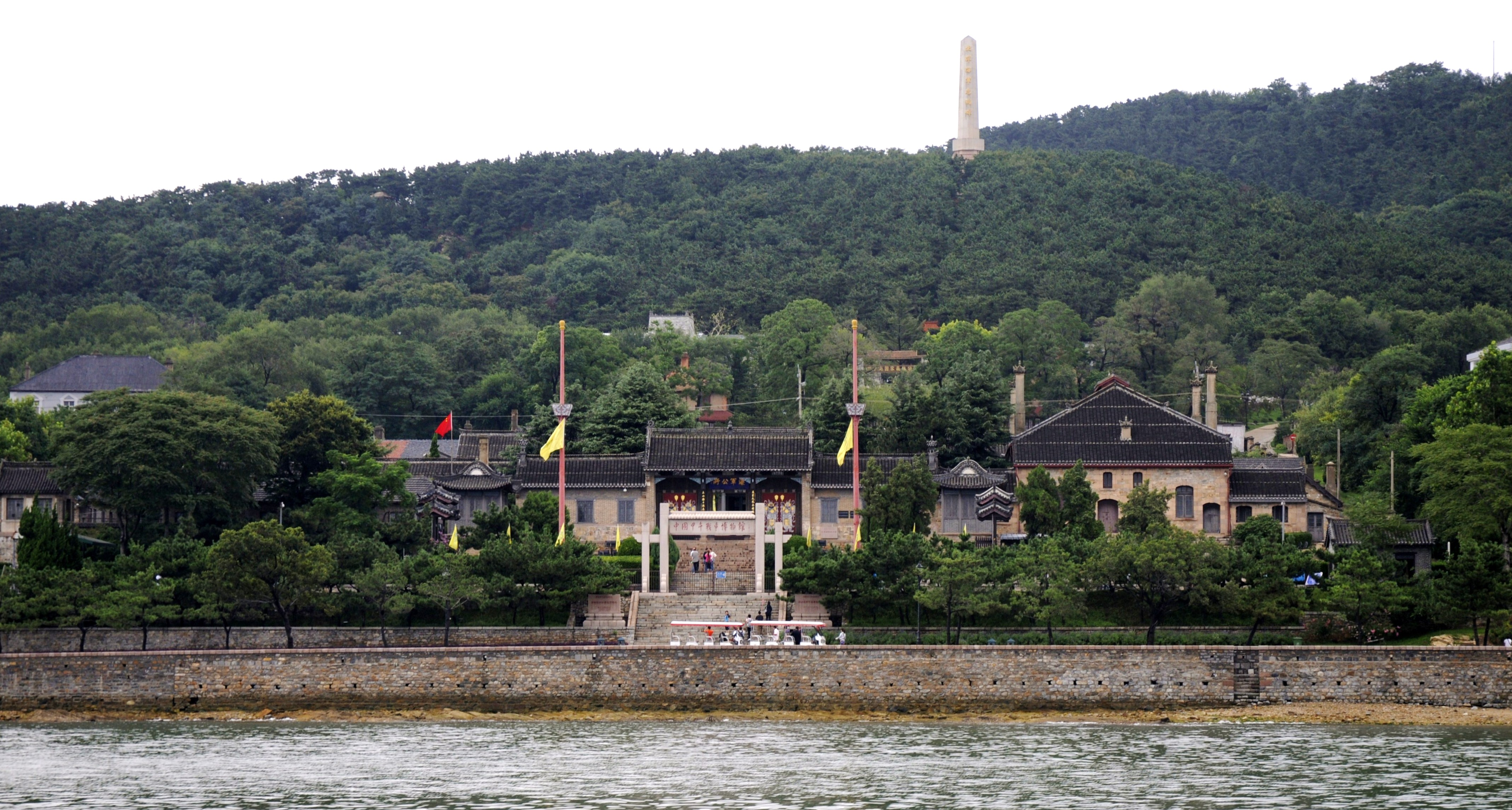
Admiral office in Liugong Island, Weihaiwei

This city sits at the Northeastern tip of the Shandong Peninsula and guarded the southern entrance to the Bohai Bay. The harbour of Weihai was guarded by Liugong Island and had excellent deep waters for the basing of large warships. The naval base was established in 1887 due to the limited budget of the fleet soon the harbour was fortified, with an arsenal including a torpedo factory being constructed too, other facilities included an ammunition depot and coaling facilities important for the fleet.

=== Lushunkou ===
This base sat at the southeastern tip of the Liaodong Peninsula and guarded the northern entrance to the Bohai Bay. Construction of the base was given particular priority, and a French syndicate constructed most of the facilities; the construction ran from 1880 to 1890 and cost approximately three million taels. The port also hosted torpedo and mining facilities and hosted a large dockyard the only one capable of repairing the Dingyuan class battleships. Port Arthur was of particular importance that the Navy Regulations stipulated half the year must be spent there by senior officers of the fleet. However, there is controversy over the decision to adopt Lushunkou as the primary base given its relative isolation something that proved particularly important in the First Sino-Japanese war, this was explained as being necessary as Li as the limited budget of the fleet meant that despite Qingdao being the superior naval base with a larger and more amenable bay the financial capacity to establish a base was not sufficient.

== Sino-French War ==
The Beiyang Fleet took good care to stay out of range of Admiral Amédée Courbet's Far East Squadron during the Sino-French War (August 1884 – April 1885). Nevertheless, it featured prominently in the calculations of the French government between 1883 and 1885. The Beiyang Fleet was due to take delivery in early 1884 of Dingyuan, Jiyuan and Zhenyuan, three modern warships then building in German shipyards. In December 1883, as war with China seemed increasingly likely, the French persuaded the German government to delay the release of these three ships. They did not reach China until the autumn of 1885, after the end of the Sino-French War.

In late June 1884, when the news of the Bắc Lệ ambush broke, the French admiral Sébastien Lespès, commander of the Far East naval division, was cruising off Che-foo in the Gulf of Petchili with the French warships La Galissonnière, Triomphante, Volta and Lutin, while the Beiyang Fleet lay at anchor in Che-foo harbour. Although war was clearly imminent, France and China remained technically at peace, and Lespès was forbidden to attack the Beiyang Fleet pending the outcome of diplomatic efforts to resolve the crisis. On 3 July 1884 the Beiyang Fleet's commander, Admiral Ding Ruchang (丁汝昌), withdrew his ships from Che-foo to Pei-ho, where a strong bar across the harbour protected them from the French ships. The fleet remained at Pei-ho in almost complete idleness throughout the Sino-French War.

In February 1885 the Beiyang Fleet reluctantly released two of its ships, Chaoyong and Yangwei, to join a sortie launched by a number of ships of the Nanyang Fleet to break the French blockade of Formosa. The two ships set sail for Shanghai to join the Nanyang vessels, but were almost immediately recalled by Li Hongzhang, who claimed that they were needed to watch the Japanese in Korea. The result was the loss of two Chinese warships from the Nanyang Fleet at the Battle of Shipu (14 February 1885). Li's selfish attitude was neither forgotten nor forgiven, and in the First Sino-Japanese War the Nanyang Fleet made little attempt to help the Beiyang Fleet.

== Composition, 1894 ==
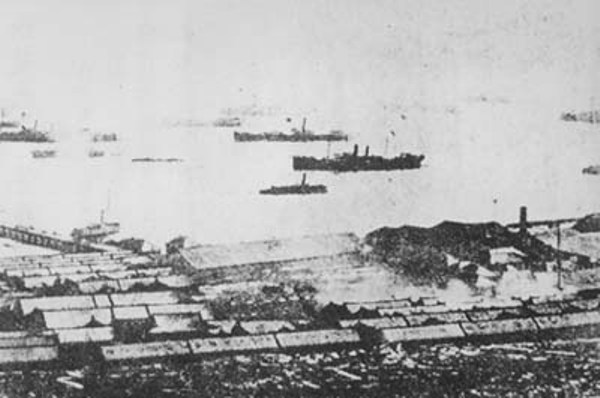
The Beiyang fleet at anchor in Weihaiwei

In 1894, on the eve of the war with Japan, the Beiyang Fleet was in theory the most powerful fleet in Asia. It was only one of China's four regional fleets, but in numbers it equalled Japan's entire fleet. The pride of the Beiyang Fleet were the German-built steel turret battleships Dingyuan (定遠) and Zhenyuan (鎮遠).

Between 1881 and 1889 the Beiyang Fleet acquired a squadron of eight protected or armoured cruisers, most of which were built in either Britain or Germany. The cruisers Chaoyong (超勇) and Yangwei (揚威), which joined the fleet in 1881 and which Li Hongzhang prudently kept far from the scene of action during the Sino-French War, were products of Laird's yard, Birkenhead. Three German-built cruisers, Jiyuan, Jingyuan (normally romanised as Kingyuan or King Yuen (經遠) to distinguish her from another, British-built, cruiser whose name was pronounced identically) and Laiyuan (來遠), were completed in 1887 in the Vulcan yard at Stettin. Another pair of protected cruisers, Chingyuan (靖遠) and Zhiyuan (致遠), were built by Armstrong Whitworth at its new Elswick yard in 1887. The latter pair were a class loosely known as the "Elswick Cruisers", ships built for export under a generally similar design. These cruisers were fast (25 knots) and heavily armed, but were not adopted by the Royal Navy because the Admiralty considered them to be "weak in structure". The Admiralty view proved correct when both Chinese ships were lost in the Sino-Japanese War. (So were the Japanese Elswick Cruisers Yoshino and Takasago during the 1904 Russo-Japanese War, though not for the design reasons – the first was accidentally rammed, and the second struck a mine and blew up.) These foreign-built ships were joined in 1889 by the ironclad coastal battleship Pingyuan, a product of the Foochow Navy Yard originally named Longwei (Lung-wei, 龍威).

The Beiyang Fleet also included six steel but unarmoured British-built gunboats, delivered in 1879. These gunboats, of identical specifications, were named respectively Zhenbei ("Guard the north"), Zhendong ("Guard the east"), Zhennan ("Guard the south"), Zhenxi ("Guard the west"), Zhenbian ("Guard the frontier") and Zhenzhong ("Guard the interior"). The first four ships were originally to have been allocated to the Nanyang Fleet, but Li Hongzhang was so impressed with their quality that he took them over for the Beiyang Fleet, compensating the Nanyang Fleet with four elderly gunboats that had served with the Beiyang Fleet since 1876.

The Beiyang Fleet also possessed an array of small torpedo boats. Exact numbers are uncertain, because these craft were not systematically listed, but some details are known. Four 16-ton torpedo boats were built in 1883 at the Vulcan yard in Stettin for the use of the steel battleships Dingyuan and Zhenyuan. These four craft, known respectively as Dingyuan No. 1 and No. 2 and Zhenyuan No. 1 and No. 2, were delayed in harbour by the Germans during the Sino-French War along with their mother ships, and joined the Beiyang Fleet in October 1885.

Battleships

Name (pinyin)	Name (Wade Giles)	Characters	Type	Construction	Specifications
Dingyuan	Ting-yuen	定遠	steel battleship	1882, Vulcan, Stettin	7,430 tons, 14.5 knots, four 12-in guns, two 5.9-in guns, three 14-in torpedo tubes
Zhenyuan	Chen-yuen	鎮遠	steel battleship	1882, Vulcan, Stettin	7,430 tons, 14.5 knots, four 12-in guns, two 5.9-in guns, three 14-in torpedo tubes
Pingyuan	P'ing-yuen	平遠	ironclad coastal battleship	1889, Foochow Navy Yard	2,150 tons, 10.5 knots, one 10-in gun, two 5.9-in guns, four 18-in torpedo tubes

Cruisers

Name (pinyin)	Name (Wade Giles)	Characters	Type	Construction	Specifications
Chaoyong	Ch'ao-yung	超勇	steel cruiser	1881, Laird, Birkenhead	1,350 tons, 15 knots, two 10-in guns, four 4.7-in guns, two 15-in torpedo tubes
Yangwei	Yang-wei	揚威	steel cruiser	1881, Laird, Birkenhead	1,350 tons, 15 knots, two 10-in guns, four 4.7-in guns, two 15-in torpedo tubes
Jiyuan	Chi-yuen	濟遠	steel protected cruiser	1884, Vulcan, Stettin	2,440 tons, 15 knots, two 8-in guns, one 5.9-in gun, four 15-inch torpedo tubes
Jingyuan	Ching-yuen	經遠	steel protected cruiser	1887, Vulcan, Stettin	2,900 tons, 16 knots, two 8.3-in guns, two 5.9-in guns, four 18-in torpedo tubes
Laiyuan	Lai-yuen	來遠	steel protected cruiser	1887, Vulcan, Stettin	2,900 tons, 16 knots, two 8.3-in guns, two 5.9-in guns, four 18-in torpedo tubes
Zhiyuan	Chih-yuen	致遠	steel protected cruiser	1887, Armstrong Whitworth, Elswick	2,355 tons, 18 knots, three 8.2-in guns, two 5.9-in guns, four 18-in torpedo tubes
Jingyuan	Ching-yuen	靖遠	steel protected cruiser	1887, Armstrong Whitworth, Elswick	2,355 tons, 18 knots, three 8.2-in guns, two 5.9-in guns, four 18-in torpedo tubes

Gunboats

Name (pinyin)	Name (Wade Giles)	Characters	Type	Construction	Specifications
Zhenbei	Chen-pei	鎮北	steel Rendel gunboat	1879, Laird, Birkenhead	440 tons, 10 knots, one 35-ton Armstrong, two 22-pdr guns
Zhenbian	Chen-pien	鎮邊	steel Rendel gunboat	1879, Laird, Birkenhead	440 tons, 10 knots, one 35-ton Armstrong, two 22-pdr guns
Zhendong	Chen-tung	鎮東	steel Rendel gunboat	1879, Laird, Birkenhead	440 tons, 10 knots, one 35-ton Armstrong, two 22-pdr guns
Zhennan	Chen-nan	鎮南	steel Rendel gunboat	1879, Laird, Birkenhead	440 tons, 10 knots, one 35-ton Armstrong, two 22-pdr guns
Zhenxi	Chen-hsi	鎮西	steel Rendel gunboat	1879, Laird, Birkenhead	440 tons, 10 knots, one 35-ton Armstrong, two 22-pdr guns
Zhenzhong	Chen-chung	鎮中	steel Rendel gunboat	1879, Laird, Birkenhead	440 tons, 10 knots, one 35-ton Armstrong, two 22-pdr guns

Torpedo boats

Name (English)	Name (pinyin)	Name (Wade Giles)	Characters	Type	Construction	Specifications
Dingyuan No. 1	Dingyuan yihao	Ting-yuen i-hao	定遠一號	torpedo boat	1883, Vulcan, Stettin	15.7 tons, two 14-in torpedo tubes in bow
Dingyuan No. 2	Dingyuan erhao	Ting-yuen erh-hao	定遠二號	torpedo boat	1883, Vulcan, Stettin	15.7 tons, two 14-in torpedo tubes in bow
Zhenyuan No. 1	Zhenyuan yihao	Chen-yuen i-hao	鎮遠一號	torpedo boat	1883, Vulcan, Stettin	15.7 tons, two 14-in torpedo tubes in bow
Zhenyuan No. 2	Zhenyuan erhao	Chen-yuen erh-hao	鎮遠二號	torpedo boat	1883, Vulcan, Stettin	15.7 tons, two 14-in torpedo tubes in bow

Torpedo boats

- Left Fleet 1 "左隊一號"
- Left Fleet 2 "左隊二號"
- Left Fleet 3 "左隊三號"
- Right Fleet 1 "右隊一號"
- Right Fleet 2 "右隊二號"
- Right Fleet 3 "右隊三號"
- Fulong "福龍"
- "捷順"

Training ships

- Kangji "康濟"
- Weiyuan *"威遠"
- "敏捷"

Auxiliary ships

- "泰安"
- Zhenhai "鎮海"
- Caojiang "操江"
- "湄云"

Transport

- Liyun "利運"

=== Beiyang Fleet land units ===
The Beiyang Fleet maintained a naval infantry unit of 300 marines who were identified by their red uniforms, as opposed to the regular Beiyang Navy white dress uniforms for the summer and autumn, and blue dress uniform for the winter and spring. In addition to amphibious warfare, the marines also conducted firefighting and military policing.

The marines saw action following the First Sino-Japanese War when they attempted to retake Nanbang Fort (南幫炮台) after it was attacked by Japanese forces on Christmas day of 1895 and fell on 29 December 1895. However, the marines failed to dislodge the Japanese from the fort.

== First Sino-Japanese War and demise ==
Flag of Provincial Commander-in-Chief of Beiyang Fleet

Flag of Fleet Commander of the Beiyang Fleet

In 1894, the Imperial Japanese Navy launched the First Sino-Japanese War against China. Due to the lack of government funding and the intensive Japanese naval program, Beiyang's once superior resources were becoming outdated. By the time of the Battle of Yalu River (1894), the Beiyang Fleet suffered heavy losses due to the surprise attack of the Japanese and the inferiority of its equipment, and was eventually annihilated in the Battle of Weihaiwei.

Minor attempts to rebuild the fleet were made after the war, but the Beiyang Navy was never to reattain its former significance. From 1896 to 1899 the fleet received new ships from Germany and the United Kingdom, including the Hai Qi-class cruisers Hai Qi and Hai Tien that arrived in Dagū, where they became part of the reorganized Beiyang Fleet at the time of the Boxer Rebellion.

In 1909 the Beiyang and Nanyang fleets were merged and re-organised into the Sea Fleet and the River Fleet.

== Ships of the Beiyang Fleet ==
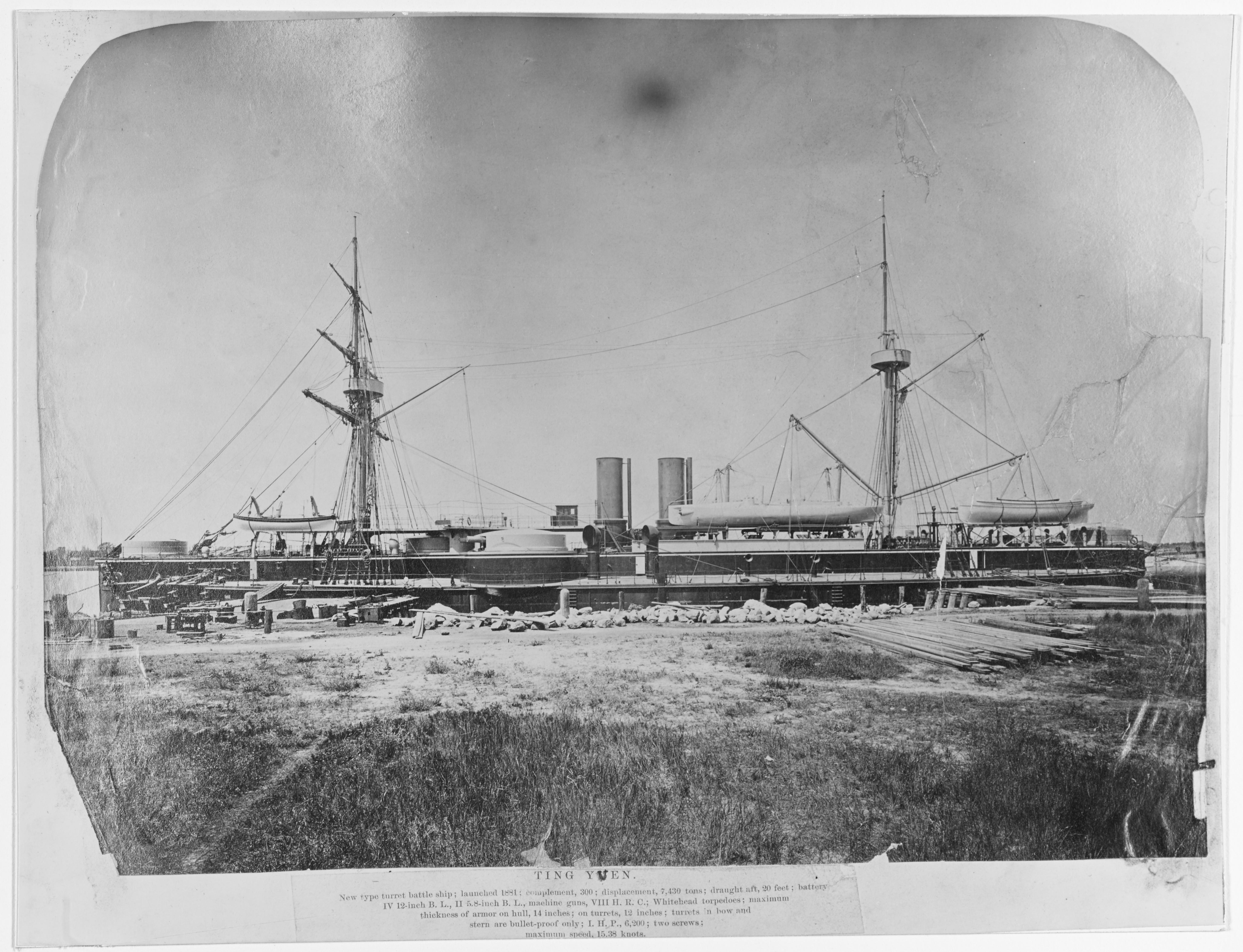
Dingyuan (定遠)

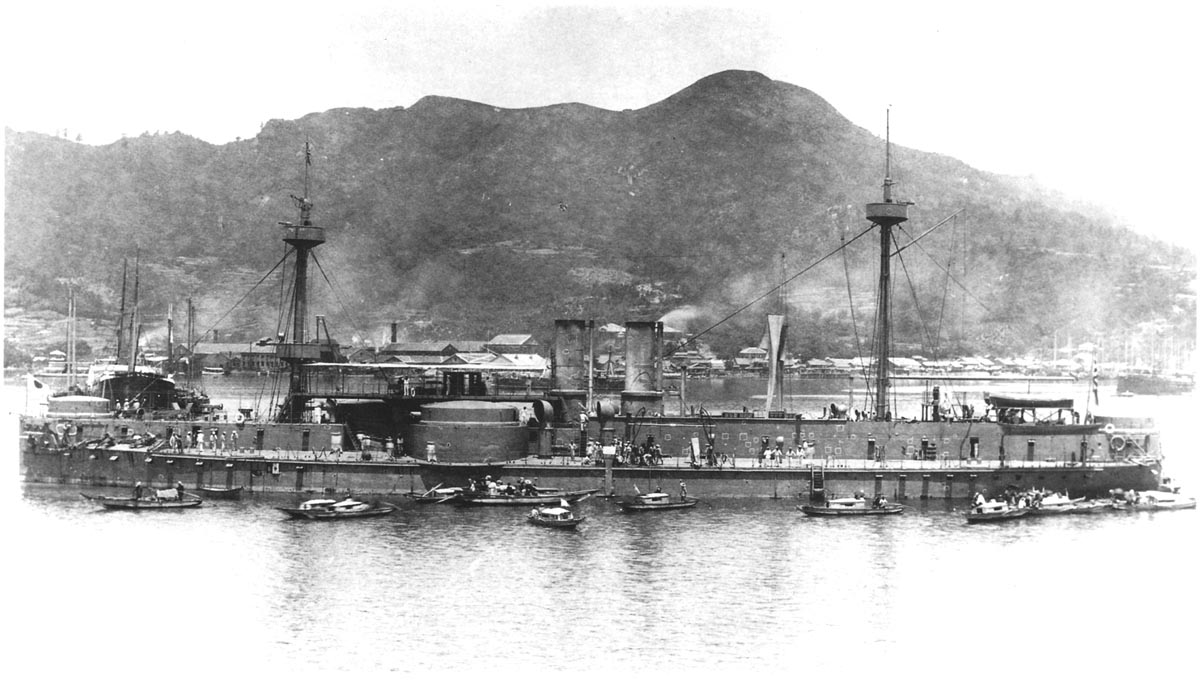
Zhenyuan (鎮遠)

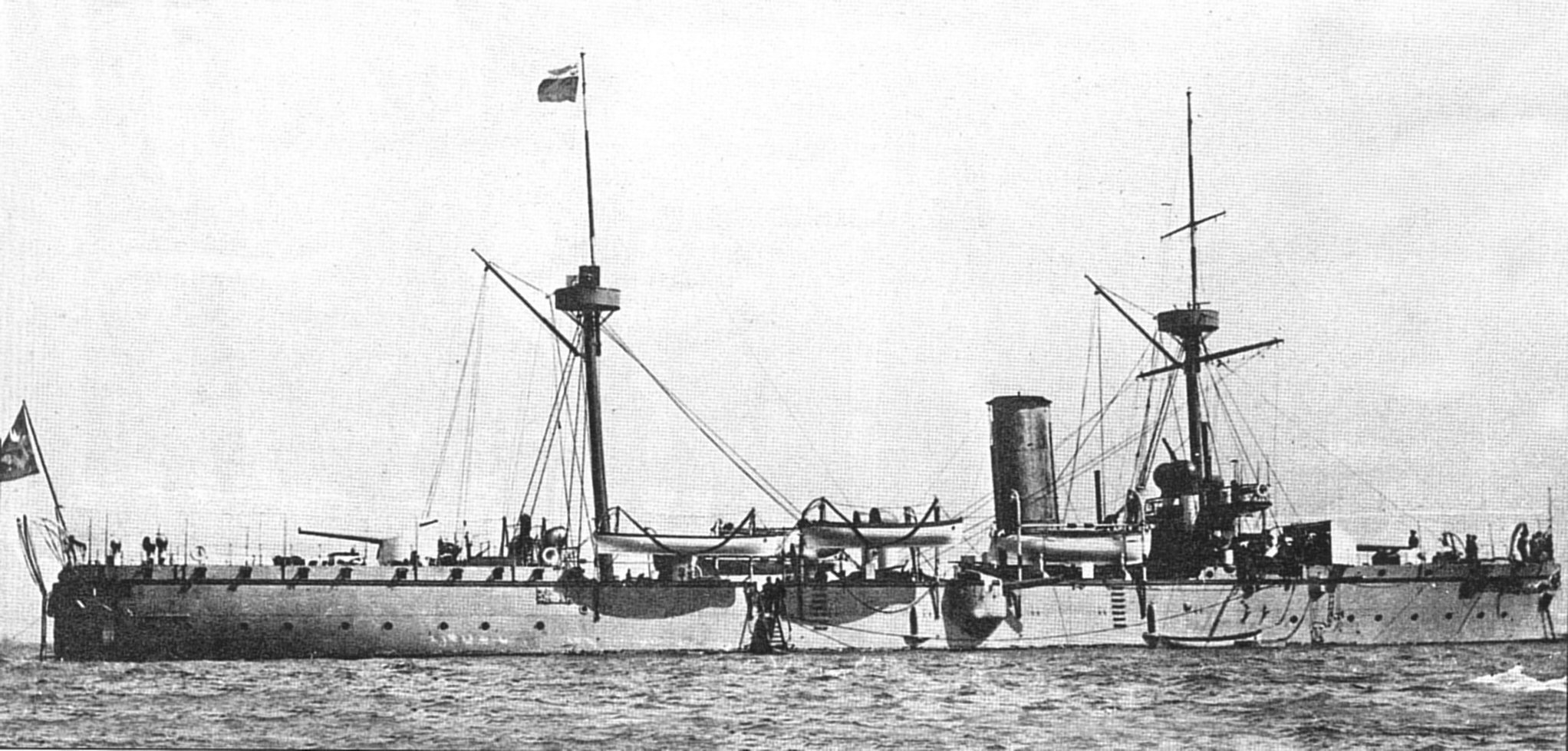
Jingyuan (靖遠)

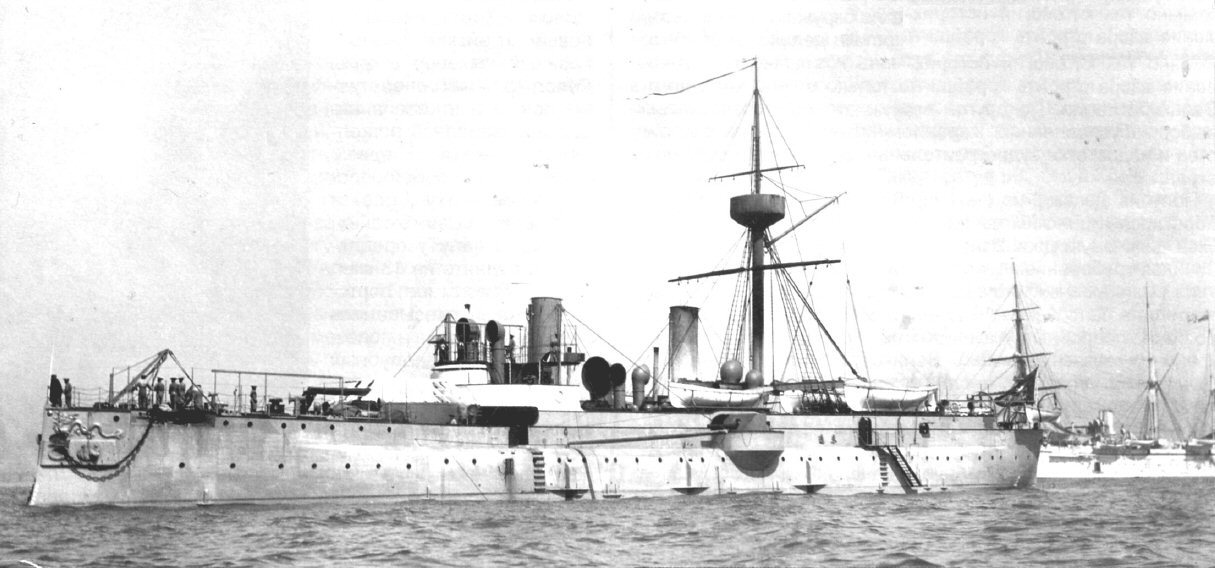
Jingyuan (經遠)

Lai Yuan (來遠)

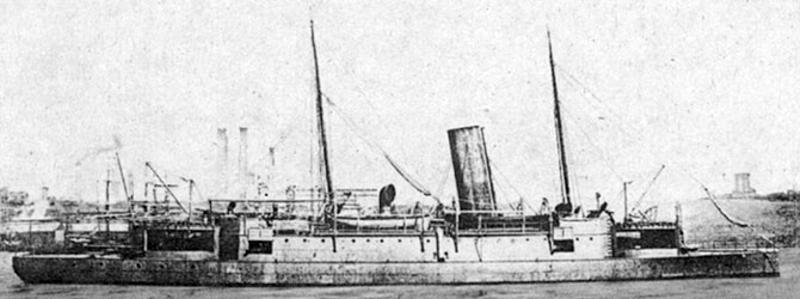
Chaoyong (超勇)

== See also ==
- Beiyang Army
- Self-Strengthening Movement
- Anthem of the Beiyang Fleet
