= Anthem of the Beiyang Fleet =

Official song

The Anthem of the Beiyang Fleet (simplified Chinese: 北洋海军军歌; traditional Chinese: 北洋海軍軍歌 Hanyu Pinyin: Běiyáng hǎijūn jūngē) was the official anthem of Beiyang Fleet during the Qing Dynasty, and was presumed lost after the defeat of the Beiyang Fleet in the First Sino-Japanese War. The piece was re-discovered by Yue Chen (Chinese: 陈悦) in the archives of the Royal Navy in the United Kingdom in 2012. A modern adaptation was arranged by Xue Ye (Chinese: 雪野) for the People's Liberation Army Navy. The documentary Rise and Fall of Beiyang Fleet presented by CCTV uses this anthem as its theme music.

The anthem shares the same tune with Tune of Li Zhongtang.

== Lyrics ==
=== Traditional Chinese ===
寶祚延庥萬國歡
景星拱極五雲端
海波澄碧春輝麗
旌節花間集鳳鸞

=== Simplified Chinese ===
宝祚延庥万国欢
景星拱极五云端
海波澄碧春辉丽
旌节花间集凤鸾

=== Hanyu Pinyin ===
Bǎozuò yánxiū wànguó huān
Jǐngxīng gǒngjí wǔ yún duān
Hǎibō chéngbì chūnhuī lì
Jīngjié huājiān jí fèngluán

=== English Translation ===
Ten thousand nations celebrate the Imperial throne's prosperity
The fortune star climbs over the iridescent clouds of five colors
The crystal blue ocean glitters under spring's sunshine
Tributaries bow to the Emperor like flowers centering a phoenix

== See also ==
- Beiyang Fleet
