= Hai Qi-class cruiser =

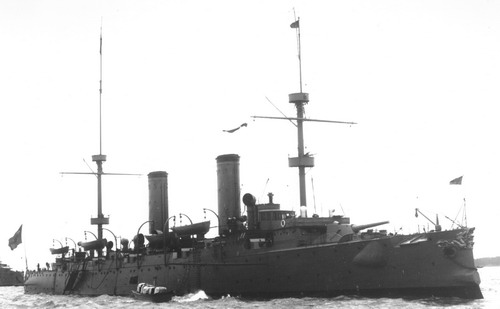
- Chinese cruiser Hai Chi

Class overview
- Name: Hai Chi class
- Builders: Armstrong Whitworth, Elswick, Tyne and Wear, United Kingdom
- Operators: Imperial Chinese Navy; Republic of China Navy; Beiyang Army
- Preceded by: Hai Yung class
- Succeeded by: Chao Ho class
- Cost: £336,659
- Built: 1896–1899
- In commission: 1899–1937
- Completed: 2
- Lost: 1
- Retired: 1

General characteristics
- Type: Protected cruiser
- Displacement: 4,300 tons (standard); 4,515 t (full load)
- Length: 129.2 m (423 ft 11 in) o/a
- Beam: 14.2 m (46 ft 7 in)
- Draught: 5.45 m (17 ft 11 in)
- Propulsion: 2 shafts, 4 Hawthorn Leslie VTE engines, 12-cylindrical boilers, 17,000 bhp (12,700 kW)
- Speed: 24.15 knots (27.79 mph; 44.73 km/h)
- Range: 8,000 nmi (15,000 km) at 'economical speed'
- Complement: 400
- Armament: 2 × 203.2-millimetre (8 in)/45 (1 × 1); 10 × 120 mm (4.7 in)/45 (1 × 1); 16 × 47 mm (1.9 in)/40 (16 × 1); 5 × 450 mm (18 in) torpedo tubes (1 × 1 bow, 4 × 1 stern)
- Armour: Deck: 37–127 mm (1.5–5.0 in); Turrets: 114.3 mm (4.5 in); Barbettes: 51 mm (2.0 in); Conning tower: 152 mm (6.0 in)

The Hai Chi class (Chinese: 海圻級; pinyin: Hǎi Qí jí; Wade–Giles: Hai Chi ji; lit. 'Sea Boundary class') was a class of two protected cruisers built for the Qing Dynasty from 1896–1899. The Hai Chi class was ordered shortly after the conclusion of the First Sino-Japanese War from the United Kingdom to replace the catastrophic losses of the Beiyang Fleet. The Hai Chi class would remain one of the largest ship classes commissioned by China until the Cold War. The Hai Chi class would go on to serve in the Republic of China Navy through the National Protection War, World War I, the Second Zhili–Fengtian War, and the Northern Expedition.

== Design and development ==
With the conclusion of the First Sino-Japanese War in 1895, the Manchu Qing dynasty which had ruled China for over two hundred years was left broken. Her newly built, costly navy, the Beiyang Fleet, had been annihilated and her armies decimated by the more modern Imperial Japanese Army. With the weakness of China's military abilities exposed, foreign powers renewed attempts to carve up China with unequal treaties. In a few years after the war, several such treaties were signed with the Qing government. In 1896 the Li–Lobanov Treaty was signed with the Russian Empire effectively ceding sovereignty over Northeast China to Russia. In 1898 the Convention for the Extension of Hong Kong Territory was signed with the United Kingdom, leasing the territory for 99 years. A similar unequal treaty with the German Empire was signed in the same year for a 99-year lease of Jiaozhou. The following year Guangzhouwan was leased to France. With more Western powers looking for territorial concessions, The Qing government announced an ambitious plan to rebuild China's navy in May 1896 with western built ships. The Marquis of Suyi, Li Hongzhang, was appointed to head the mission. Li, a veteran diplomat of the Qing was sent as China's special envoy to the coronation of Nicholas II of Russia, where he concluded the aforementioned unequal treaty bearing his name with Aleksey Lobanov-Rostovsky. From Moscow, Li toured through Europe, visiting Germany, France, Belgium and the United Kingdom by August 1896 to solicit orders for warships. Li then crossed the Atlantic to the United States to advocate for the reform of the Chinese Exclusion Act. Due to continued financial problems created by the wake of the Sino-Japanese War, a modest order of three protected cruisers from Vulcan, two protected cruisers from Armstrong Whitworth and four destroyers from Schichau were ordered, rather than the battleships originally envisioned.

The two cruisers from, Armstrong Whitworth would be named Hai Chi (Chinese: 海圻; Wade–Giles: Hai Chi; lit. 'Sea Boundary'), the lead ship and Hai Tien (Chinese: 海天; pinyin: Hǎi Tiān; Wade–Giles: Hai Tien; lit. 'Heavenly Sea') and ordered July 1896. Hai Chi would be laid down on 11 November 1896, launched 24 January 1889 and commissioned 10 May 1899. Her sister ship, Hai Tien, although laid down nearly three months earlier on 16 February 1897 and launched 25 November 1897, would be commissioned earlier, on 28 March 1899. The Hai Chi-class design was based on the Argentinean Buenos Aires protected cruiser (designed by renowned British naval architect Philip Watts) which Armstrong Whitworth had just built a year earlier. The Hai Chi class had a displacement of 4,300 tons and a full displacement of 4,515 tons. The ships' armour was made from harvey steel. The deck was protected by a 127 mm (5 in) thick, sloped, to 37 mm (1 in) mm of armour on the flat. Gun shields were 114-millimetre (4.5 in) with 102-millimetre (4.0 in) thick ammunition hoists. The conning tower was 152-millimetre (6.0 in) thick. Like the Buenos Aires, the primary battery were two single-mounted 203.2-millimetre (8.00 in)/45 calibre guns, mounted fore and aft behind shields on the ship's centreline. Unlike the Buenos Aires, which had a mixed secondary armament of 6-inch and 4.7-inch guns, the Hai Chi class had a uniform calibre of ten secondary guns QF 4.7 inch Mk V naval gun. Tertiary armaments consisted of sixteen QF 3-pounder Hotchkiss. The Hai Chi class was also armed with five above-water, 450 mm (18 in) torpedo tubes. One tube located at the bow and four more tubes mounted broadside, just aft of the mast. Propulsion was provided by four Hawthorn Leslie vertical triple expansion engines, powered by twelve cylindrical boilers which consisted of four double-ended and four single-ended types. Capable of carrying 1000 tons of coal, range was listed as 8,000 nmi (15,000 km) at an 'economical speed'. During sea trials, Hai Tien was rated at 22.6 knots (26.0 mph; 41.9 km/h) at natural draught but was capable of up to 24.15 knots (27.79 mph; 44.73 km/h) at forced draught. Hai Tien set sail for China on 22 May 1899 with a British contract crew, followed three weeks later by Hai Chi and by August both cruisers had reached China where they joined the reconstituted Beiyang Fleet at Dàgū. Upon arrival, Hai Chi was assigned as the flagship of Commodore Sa Zhenbing.

== Ships ==
Name	Builder	Laid	Launched	Completed	Fate
Hai Chi (海圻)	Armstrong Whitworth	11 November 1896	24 January 1898	10 May 1899	Scuttled at Jiangyin on 11 August 1937 as a blockship.
Hai Tien (海天)	Armstrong Whitworth	16 February 1897	25 November 1897	28 March 1899	Foundered 25 April 1904 after hitting a rock in Hangzhou Bay.
