= Liu Guanxiong =

Chinese admiral (1861–1927)

- 劉冠雄
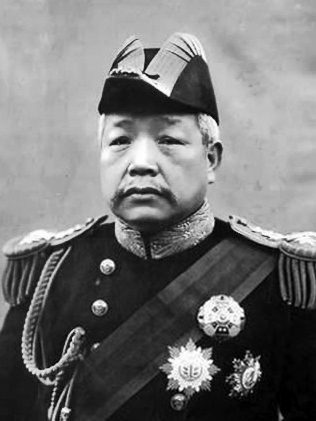

Minister of Navy
- In office 30 March 1912 – 30 June 1916
- Preceded by: Huang Zhongying
- Succeeded by: Cheng Biguang
- In office 15 July 1917 – 3 December 1919
- Preceded by: Sa Zhenbing
- Succeeded by: Sa Zhenbing

Personal details
- Born: 7 June 1861 Houguan County, Fujian, Qing dynasty
- Died: 24 June 1927 (aged 66) Tianjin, (Beiyang government) Republic of China
- Awards: Order or Rank and Merit; Order of the Precious Brilliant Golden Grain; Order of Wen-Hu

Military service
- Allegiance: Qing dynasty (Beiyang government) Republic of China; Empire of China
- Branch/service: Imperial Chinese Navy; Republic of China Navy
- Commands: Admiral
- Battles/wars: First Sino-Japanese War

Liu Guanxiong (Chinese: 劉冠雄; 1861, Fuzhou, Fujian – 1927, Tianjin) was a Chinese admiral from the late Qing dynasty and the early Republic of China who was Navy Minister of China, from 1912 to 1916 and from 1917 to 1919. When he was young he entered the Navy College of Fuzhou and was sent abroad to Britain. He was named Minister of the Navy and Commander-in-Chief upon the founding of the Republic of China. He was also Minister of Education (1913) and Transportation Minister (1912). During Yuan Shikai's rule as Emperor in 1915 he was named a Duke. Liu turned to Duan Qirui soon after Yuan's death, but the Chinese fleet became fractured and split due to Duan's refusal to validate the abolished Constitution.

== International relations ==
Liu met with the vice chairman of Bethlehem Steel Archibald Johnston and American naval attache Irvin van Gillis in late December 1913 to gain his support for the construction of the Sanduao military port in Fuzhou. Liu agreed to this and allowed Johnson and Gillis to inspect the port and the shipyard in Mawei.

== Gallery ==
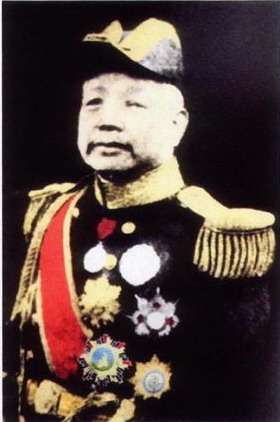
Liu Guanxiong

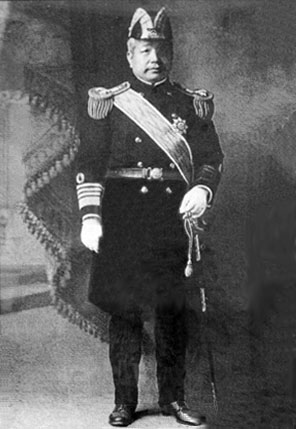
Liu Guanxiong

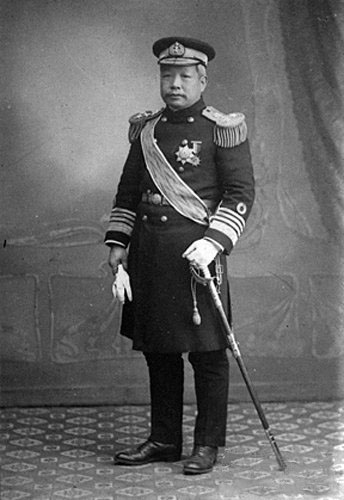
Liu Guanxiong

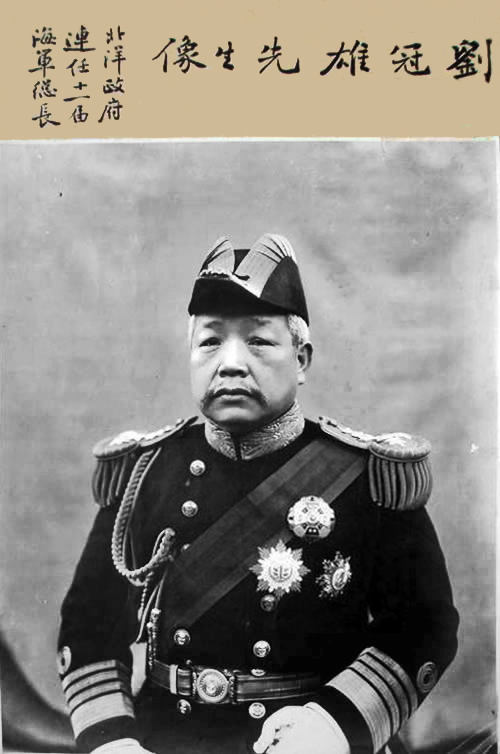
Liu Guanxiong

Military offices
Preceded by Huang Zhongying	Minister of Navy of the Republic of China; 1912–1916	Succeeded by Cheng Biguang
Preceded by Sa Zhenbing	Minister of Navy of the Republic of China; 1917–1919	Succeeded by Sa Zhenbing
