= Wang Jian (poet) =

Chinese poet

Wang Jian (Chinese: 王建; pinyin: Wáng Jiàn; Wade–Giles: Wang Chien, 766?–831?) was a Chinese poet of the Tang dynasty. One of his poems is included in the famous anthology Three Hundred Tang Poems.

== Biography ==
Wang Jian was born around 766.

He died around 831.

== Poetry ==
Wang Jian had one poem collected in Three Hundred Tang Poems, which was translated by Witter Bynner as "A Bride". He was also known to write in the rare six-syllable line, which is characterized by the presence of two caesuras per line, dividing each line into three parts of two syllables each.

One of Wang's poems was adapted in the Tune of Li Zhongtang by Li Hongzhang for use as an unofficial national anthem in 1896, (the 22nd year of Guangxu) during a diplomatic visit to western Europe and Russia.

== Works cited ==
- Frankel, Hans H. (1978). The Flowering Plum and the Palace Lady. (New Haven and London: Yale University Press) ISBN 0-300-02242-5
- Ueki, Hisayuki; Uno, Naoto; Matsubara, Akira (1999). "Shijin to Shi no Shōgai (Ō Ken)". In Matsuura, Tomohisa (ed.). Kanshi no Jiten 漢詩の事典 (in Japanese). Tokyo: Taishūkan Shoten. p. 118. OCLC 41025662.
- Watson, Burton (1971). CHINESE LYRICISM: Shih Poetry from the Second to the Twelfth Century. New York: Columbia University Press. ISBN 0-231-03464-4

== See also ==
- Geng (dish)
