= Sa Zhenbing =

Chinese admiral

Admiral Sa Zhenbing KCMG
- 薩鎮冰
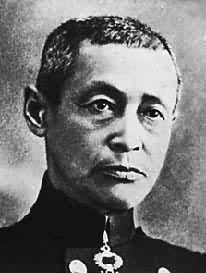

Acting Premier of China
- In office 14 May 1920 – 9 August 1920
- President: Xu Shichang
- Preceded by: Jin Yunpeng
- Succeeded by: Jin Yunpeng

Minister of Navy of the Great Qing
- In office 2 November 1911 – 12 February 1912
- Monarch: Xuantong Emperor
- Prime Minister: Yuan Shikai
- Preceded by: Zaixun
- Succeeded by: Position abolished
- In office 1 July 1917 – 12 July 1917
- Monarch: Xuantong Emperor
- Prime Minister: Zhang Xun
- Preceded by: Position established
- Succeeded by: Position abolished

Minister of Navy
- In office June 1917 – July 1917
- Preceded by: Cheng Biguang
- Succeeded by: Liu Guanxiong
- In office December 1919 – May 1921
- Preceded by: Liu Guanxiong
- Succeeded by: Li Dingxin

Personal details
- Born: March 30, 1859 Fuzhou, Qing Empire
- Died: April 10, 1952 (aged 93) Fuzhou, People's Republic of China
- Party: Anhui clique
- Awards: Order of Wen-Hu; Order of St Michael and St George

Military service
- Allegiance: Qing dynasty
- Branch/service: Imperial Chinese Navy
- Years of service: 1869–1911
- Rank: Admiral
- Commands: Beiyang Fleet; Nanyang Fleet; Guangdong Fleet; Imperial Chinese Navy (unified by Sa Zhenbing)
- Battles/wars: First Sino-Japanese War; Xinhai Revolution

Sa Zhenbing KCMG (simplified Chinese: 萨镇冰; traditional Chinese: 薩鎮冰; pinyin: Sà Zhènbīng; Wade–Giles: Sah Chen-ping) (30 March 1859 – 10 April 1952) was a prominent Chinese admiral of the late Qing dynasty and the early Republic. He lived through four governments (Qing, Beiyang, Nationalist, Communist) in China, and had been appointed to various senior naval and political offices.

== Early life ==
Sa Zhenbing was born in Fuzhou, Fujian province, to a Semu family of Qarluk origin who had lived in the area since the late Yuan dynasty. Between 1869 and 1872 he attended the Fuzhou Naval Academy; Deng Shichang was among his classmates. Between 1877 and 1880 Sa Zhenbing was among the first group of Fuzhou Naval Academy alumni sent abroad to study at the Royal Naval College, Greenwich in Britain.

== Battle of Weihaiwei ==
After serving as a Chief Mate in the Nanyang Fleet, Sa Zhenbing became the youngest captain in the Beiyang Fleet. In 1895 he participated in the Battle of Weihaiwei during the First Sino-Japanese War, leading a group of sailors from the training ship Kangji in a ten-day defence of an island coastal fortress off Weihaiwei.

At that time the Japanese Admiral Itō Sukeyuki appealed to the Beiyang Fleet Admiral Ding Ruchang to surrender, promising him political asylum in Japan; Admiral Ding chose to commit suicide by handgun in his office at the Liugong Island headquarters. His deputy, Admiral Liu, after ordering that his warship be scuttled by explosives, also committed suicide by taking poison. Command of the Chinese Forces fell to Scottish-born Vice-Admiral John McClure, who completed the surrender negotiations with Admiral Ito. As the only captain still alive at the end of the battle, Sa Zhenbing was given the task of formally surrendering to Admiral Ito.

== Later career ==
In 1905 Sa Zhenbing was appointed Admiral-in-Chief of the Beiyang, Nanyang and Guangdong Fleets (three out of four Qing's fleets), tasked with rebuilding the Imperial Chinese Navy after the defeat during the First Sino-Japanese War. Under his leadership the general efficiency of the Chinese naval personnel improved considerably.

In July 1909 the prince regent, Prince Chun, created a Navy Commission to prepare for the rebuilding of a naval force after its destruction in the Sino-Japanese war, and in December 1910 the commission became the Ministry of the Navy. One of its first acts was to abolish regional fleets in order to create a unified naval force for the Qing dynasty, and Sa Zhenbing was made the commander-in-chief of the navy, with his headquarters in Shanghai.

During the Wuchang Uprising of 1911, Sa Zhenbing was ordered to sail to Wuhan to suppress the revolutionaries; upon realizing his sailors' revolutionary tendencies, he left his post on 1 November for Shanghai. Nonetheless, he was appointed Minister of the Navy by Yuan Shikai, who at the time was the last Prime Minister of the Imperial Cabinet.

Sa Zhenbing briefly served as acting Prime Minister under the Beiyang government in 1920, then as Governor of Fujian Province from 1922 to 1926.

In 1949, near the end of the Chinese Civil War, Sa Zhenbing declined an offer by Chiang Kai-shek to evacuate him to Taiwan, instead pledging his allegiance to the Chinese Communist Party.

Sa Zhenbing died in his hometown of Fuzhou in 1952, aged 94.

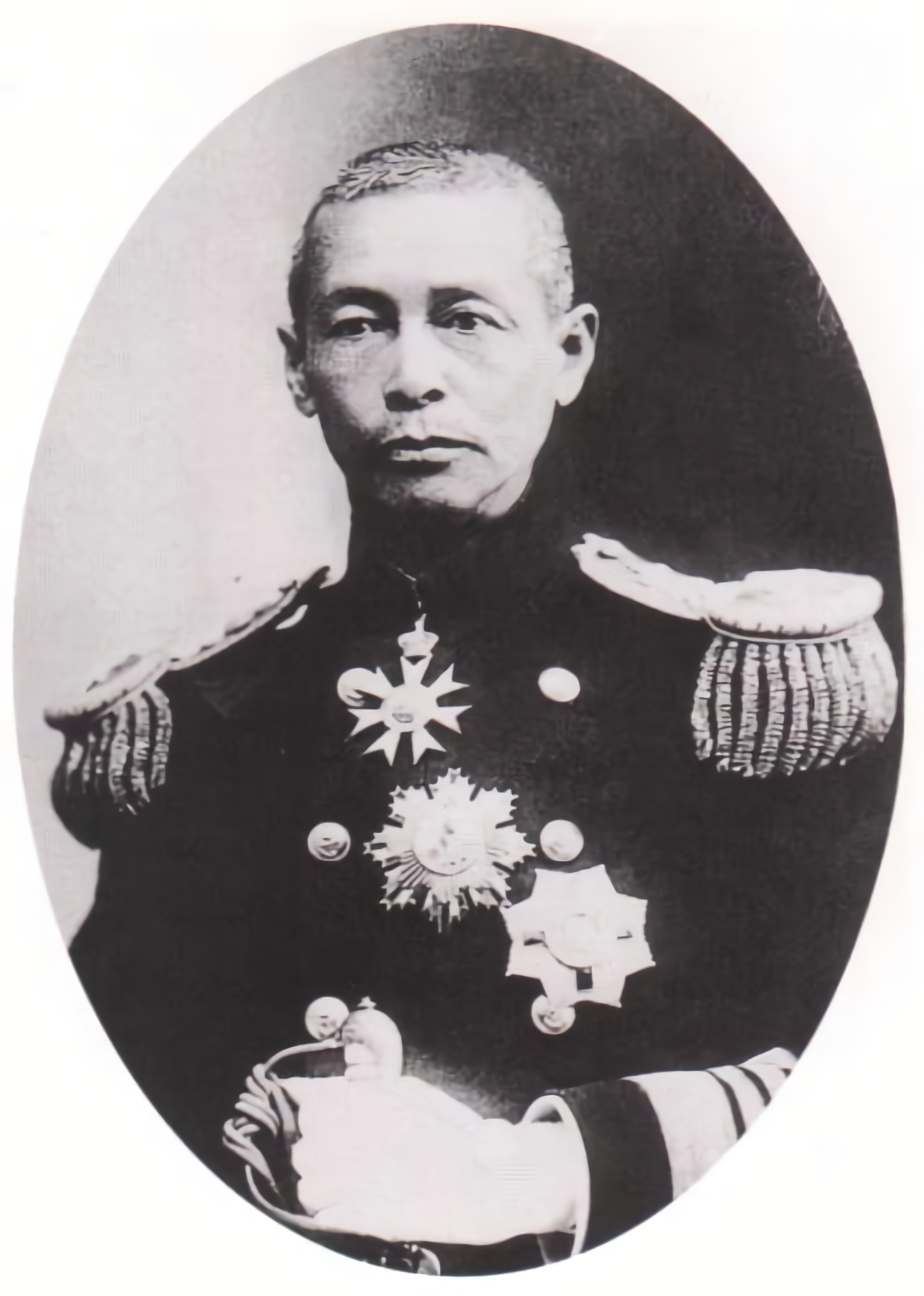
Sa Zhenbing

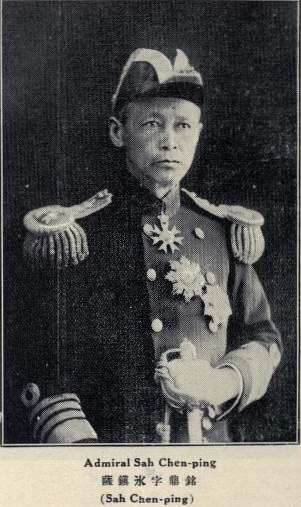
Sa Zhenbing (Who's Who in China 3rd ed., 1925)

== See also ==
- Chao Ho-class cruiser

Political offices
Preceded by Jin Yunpeng	Acting Premier of China; 1920	Succeeded by Jin Yunpeng
Preceded by Li Houji	Governor of Fujian; 1922–1926	Succeeded by Zhang Zhen (張貞) as acting director of the KMT Provincial Political Commission
Military offices
Preceded by Zaixun	Minister of Navy of the Great Qing; 1911–1912	Dynasty ended
Preceded by Cheng Biguang	Minister of Navy; 1917	Succeeded by Liu Guanxiong
Preceded by Zhang Xun Restoration	Minister of Navy (nominal) of the Great Qing (restored); 1917	Restoration failed
Preceded by Liu Guanxiong	Minister of Navy; 1919–1921	Succeeded by Li Dingxin
