= Imperial Chinese Navy =

1875–1912 naval warfare branch of the Qing military

- Active: 1132/1875–1912
- Country: China
- Allegiance: Emperor of China
- Branch: Navy
- Size: 10,000-15,000 before 1895
- Part of: Ministry of the Navy
- Garrison/HQ: Shanghai
- Fleets: Beiyang Fleet; Fujian Fleet; Guangdong Fleet; Nanyang Fleet
- Engagements: First Sino-Japanese War; Boxer Rebellion; 1911 Revolution

Commanders
- Ceremonial chief: Zaixun, Prince Rui (First); Sa Zhenbing (Last)

Insignia
- Ensign of the Imperial Chinese Navy

The Imperial Chinese Navy was the modern navy of the Qing dynasty of China established in 1875. An imperial naval force in China first came into existence in 1132 during the Southern Song dynasty and existed in some form until the end of the Qing dynasty in 1912. However, the term "Imperial Chinese Navy" usually only refers to the Qing navy that existed between 1875 and 1912, with "Imperial Chinese Navy" as its official English name. The Imperial Chinese Navy was succeeded by the Republic of China Navy.

== History ==
=== Precursors ===
In the 1860s, an attempt was made to establish a modern navy via the British-built Osborn or "Vampire" Fleet to combat the Taiping rebels' US-built gunboats. The so-called "Vampire Fleet", fitted out by the Chinese government for the suppression of piracy on the coast of China, was scrapped owing to the non-fulfilment of the condition that British commander Sherard Osborn should receive orders from the imperial government only.

=== Establishment of the Qing navy ===
In 1865, the Jiangnan Shipyard was established.

In 1874, a Japanese incursion into Taiwan exposed the vulnerability of China at sea. A proposal was made to establish three modern coastal fleets: the Northern Sea or Beiyang Fleet, to defend the Yellow Sea, the Southern Sea or Nanyang Fleet, to defend the East China Sea, and the Canton Sea or Yueyang Fleet, to defend the Taiwan Strait and the South China Sea. The Beiyang Fleet, with a remit to defend the section of coastline closest to the capital Beijing, was prioritised.

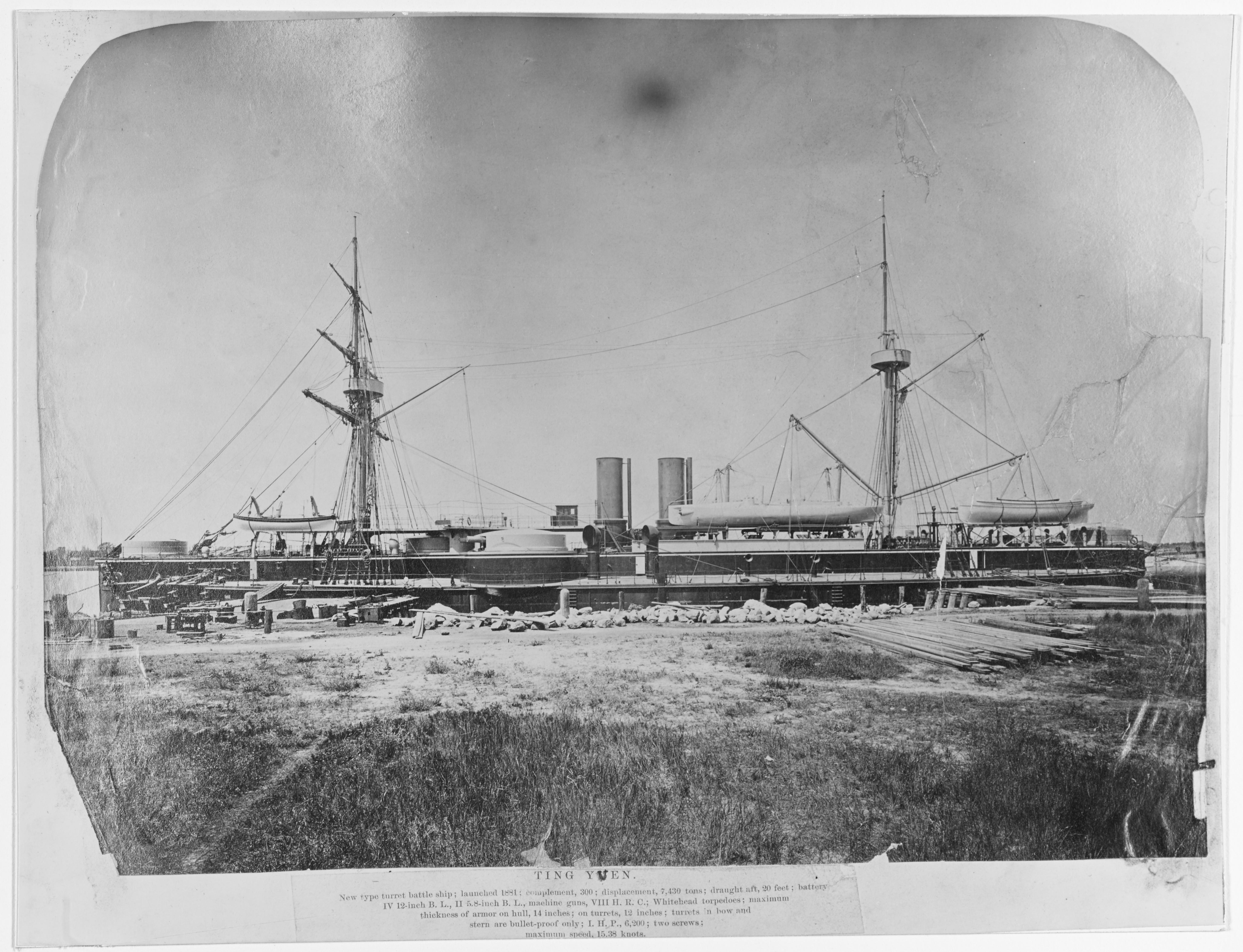
Chinese ironclad battleship Dingyuan, the flagship of the Beiyang Fleet

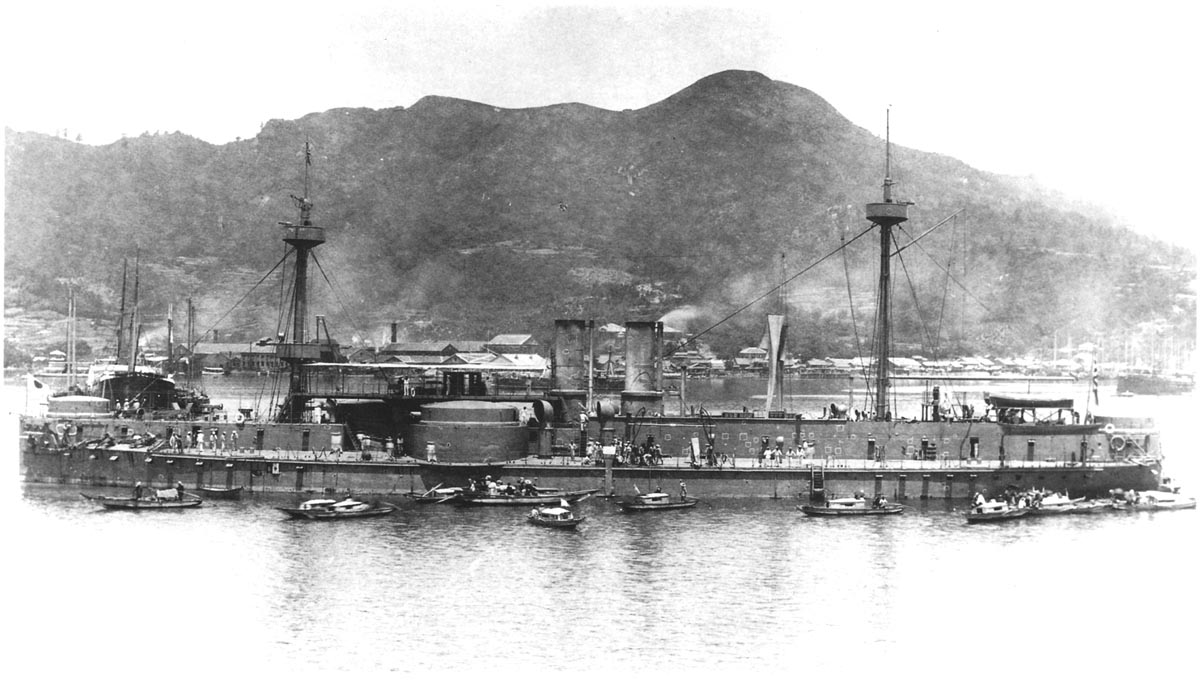
Sister ship of the Dingyuan, ironclad battleship Zhenyuan

A series of warships were ordered from Britain and Germany in the late 1870s, and naval bases were built at Port Arthur and Weihaiwei. The first British-built ships were delivered in 1881, and the Beiyang Fleet was formally established in 1888. In 1894, the Beiyang Fleet was, on paper, the strongest navy in Asia at the time. However, it was largely lost during the First Sino-Japanese War in the Battle of the Yalu River. Although the Zhenyuan and Dingyuan modern battleships were impervious to Japanese fire, they were unable to sink a single ship and all eight cruisers were lost. The battle displayed once again that the modernisation efforts of China were far inferior to the Meiji Restoration. The Nanyang Fleet was also established in 1875, and grew with mostly domestically built warships and a small number of acquisitions from Britain and Germany.

The admiralty or naval board (haijun yamen) was established in 1885.

The Nanyang Fleet fought in the Sino-French War, performing somewhat poorly against the French in all engagements.

The separate Fujian and Guangdong fleets became part of the Imperial navy after 1875. The Fujian Fleet was almost annihilated during the Sino-French War, and was only able to acquire two new ships thereafter. By 1891, due to budget cuts, the Fujian Fleet was barely a viable fleet. The Guangdong Fleet was established in the late 1860s and was based at Whampoa, in Canton (now Guangzhou).

After the First Sino-Japanese War, Zhang Zhidong established a river-based fleet in Hubei.

In 1909, the remnants of the Beiyang, Nanyang, Guangdong, and Fujian Fleets, together with the Hubei fleet, were merged, and re-organised as the Sea Fleet and the River Fleet. There were also plans to re-develop the fleet, with a budget of 7-8 million taels per year, including a small amount of loan from the United States of America.

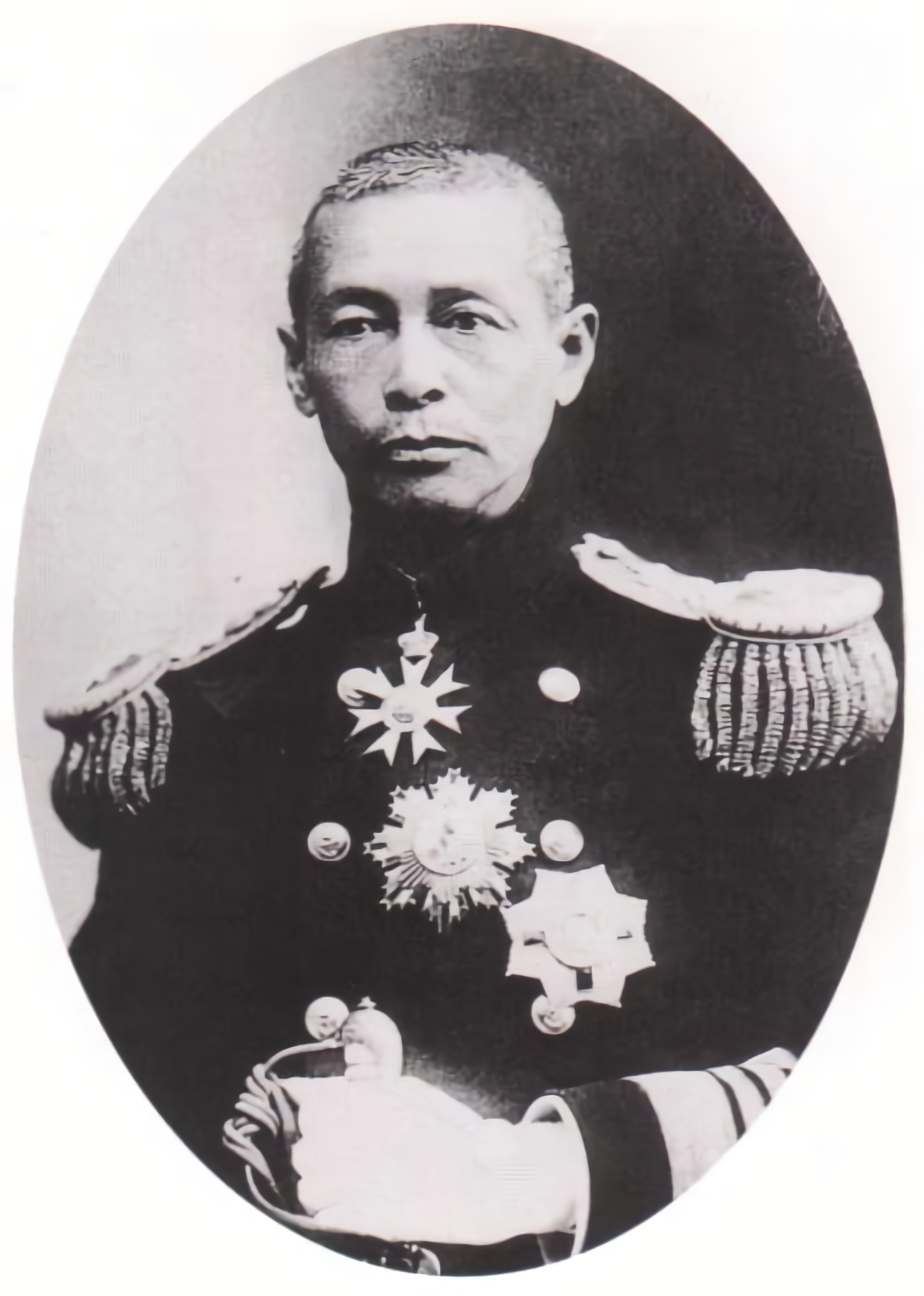
Sa Zhenbing

In 1911, Sa Zhenbing became the Minister of Navy of the Great Qing.

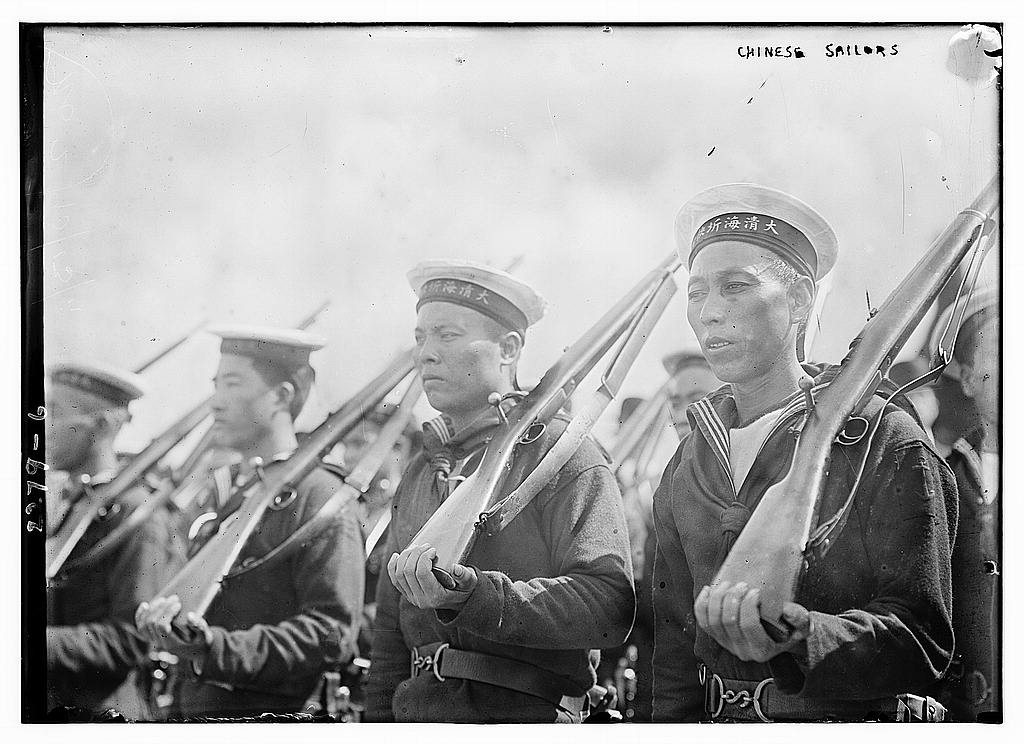
Sailors from the Hai Chi of the Imperial Chinese Navy, on parade in New York City, 1911.

One of the new ships delivered after the war with Japan, the cruiser Hai Chi, in 1911 became the first vessel flying the Yellow Dragon Flag to arrive in American waters, visiting New York City as part of a tour.

=== Successors ===
After the 1911 Revolution and the establishment of the Republic of China in 1912, the Imperial Chinese Navy was replaced by the Republic of China Navy. The People's Liberation Army Navy was established in early 1949 by the Chinese Communist Party, and after the establishment of the People's Republic of China later that year, became the main navy of China.

== Fleets ==
- Beiyang Fleet - North Sea Fleet based from Weihaiwei
- Nanyang Fleet - South Sea Fleet based from Shanghai
- Guangdong Fleet - based from Canton (now Guangzhou)
- Fujian Fleet - based from Fuzhou, founded in 1678 as the Fujian Marine Fleet

== Bases ==
- Beiyang Fleet: Liugong Island, Weihaiwei (1888–1895); occupied by Japan 1895–1898, leased to Britain 1898-1940 (until 1930 as part of Weihaiwei); re-occupied by Japan 1940–1945; used by Communist forces from 1945
  - Tianjin, home to the Tianjin Naval Academy
  - Lüshunkou, Dalian (1888–1895); occupied by Japan 1895–1898, leased to Russia 1898–1904; occupied by Japan 1904–1945; leased to Soviet Union 1945–1955; returned to China in 1955
- Nanyang Fleet: Shanghai, Nanjing
- Fujian Fleet: Foochow Arsenal, near Fuzhou (1866–1884) - fleet base of the Qing navy and naval yard and School of Naval Administration in the late 19th century; ancient shipbuilding centre
- Guangdong Fleet: Whampoa, Canton

== Governance ==
In 1885, after the Sino-French War, the Qing court set up a Navy Office to oversee the navy. In 1910, as part of the reform of the Qing government structure, the Navy Office was replaced by a Navy Ministry, headed by a Navy Secretary.

The highest ranks of the navy after the merger of the fleets in 1909 were:

- Admiral of the Imperial Chinese Navy (Zheng Dutong)
- Vice Admiral of the Imperial Chinese Navy (Fu Dutong)
- Rear Admiral of the Imperial Chinese Navy (Xie Dutong)
- Commodore of the Imperial Chinese Navy (Tongdai)
- Fleet leader of the Imperial Chinese Navy (Duizhang)

When it was first developed by Empress Dowager Cixi, the Beiyang Fleet was said to be the strongest navy in East Asia. Before her adopted son, Emperor Guangxu, took over the throne in 1889, Cixi wrote out explicit orders that the navy should continue to develop and expand gradually. On the eve of the First Sino-Japanese War, the German General Staff predicted a victory for China and William Lang, who was a British advisor to the Chinese military, praised Chinese training, ships, guns, and fortifications, stating that "in the end, there is no doubt that Japan must be utterly crushed". However, after Cixi went into retirement, all naval and military development came to a drastic halt. The military defeats suffered by China has been attributed to the factionalism of regional military governors. For instance, the Beiyang Fleet refused to participate in the Sino-French War in 1884, with the Nanyang Fleet retaliating by refusing to deploy during the Sino-Japanese War of 1895. Li Hongzhang wanted to personally maintain control of this fleet, many top vessels among its number, by keeping it in northern China and not letting it slip into the control of southern factions. China did not have a single admiralty in charge of all the Chinese navies before 1885. The northern and southern Chinese navies did not cooperate, and therefore, enemy navies needed only to fight a segment of China's navy.

== Ship types ==
Pre-19th-century ships were wood and of various sizes.

- fu po (warship) - 19th-century ships
- hai hu or sea hawks
- combat junks
- louchuan (樓船) - tower ships of the Ming dynasty
- mengchong or covered assaulter (艨艟): leather-covered assault warship - ships of the Three Kingdoms period
- river boats - Song Dynasty
- wugongchuan, or centipede ship - 16th century galley based on Portuguese types
- yu ting or patrol boats
- zhan xian or combat junks
- zou ge or flying barques

Following the First Opium War, the Qing improved their naval fleet with modern ships from Europe:

Battleships:

- Dingyuan class
  - Dingyuan (1881)
  - Zhenyuan (1882)

Coastal Defense Ships:

- Pingyuan (1890)

Cruisers:

- Chaoyung class
  - Chaoyong (1880)
  - Yangwei (1881)
- Jiyuan (1883)
- Kai Che class
  - Kai Che (1882)
  - King Ch'ing (1886)
  - Huan T'ai (1886)
- Nan Thin class
  - Nan Thin (1883)
  - Nan Shuin (1884)
  - Fu Ch'ing (1893)
- Chih Yuan class
  - Chih Yuen (1886)
  - Ching Yuen (1886)
- King Yuan class
  - King Yuen (1887)
  - Laiyuan (1887)
- Lung Wei (1888)
- Tung Chi class (Similar to American Columbia class, but were composite cruisers)
  - Tung Chi (1895)
  - Fu An (1894)
- Hǎi Qí class
  - Hai Tien (1897)
  - Hai Chi (1898)
- Hai Yung class
  - Hai Yung (1897)
  - Hai Chou (1897)
  - Hai Shen (1898)
- Chao Ho class
  - Chao Ho (1912)
  - Ying Swei (1913)

Corvettes:

== Flags ==
Flags shown are for the Imperial Chinese Navy during the period 1909 to 1911:

Naval Ensign of the Imperial Chinese Navy

Flag for the Imperial Chinese Navy Secretary

Command flag for Imperial Chinese Navy Admiral

Command flag for Imperial Chinese Navy Vice Admiral

Command flag for Imperial Chinese Navy Rear Admiral

Command flag for Imperial Chinese Navy Commodore

Command flag for Imperial Chinese Navy Senior Officer's/Fleet Leader

Imperial Chinese Navy Duty Ship Pennant

Imperial Chinese Navy Commission Pennant

Notes:The Commodore was not a substantive rank but rather, a captain commanding a squadron.

== See also ==
- Naval history of China
- Imperial Chinese Army
