= Pu Tian Yue =

Unofficial first Chinese national anthem

- Traditional Chinese: 普天樂
- Simplified Chinese: 普天乐
- Literal meaning: Whole Sky Song
Transcriptions
Standard Mandarin
- Hanyu Pinyin: pǔtiān yuè
- IPA: [pʰù tʰjɛ́n ɥê]
Yue: Cantonese
- Jyutping: pou2 tin1 ngok6

The Pu Tian Yue (Chinese: 普天樂) is considered the first national anthem of China, though it was not approved officially by the Qing government.

1914 Recording by the Victor Military Band

== History ==
In 1878 (the 4th year of the Guangxu Emperor), Zeng Jize (曾纪泽) made a diplomatic visit to Great Britain and France; he was appointed Ambassador to Russia two years later. At an international convention, a national song was needed, so he wrote the song "Pu Tian Yue" to the tune 词牌.

This song was not officially approved by the Qing government, but was recognized as the national song of China in other countries.

Rare recording

The only known versions are from a version played by the Victor Military Band, translated as "The World's Delight," recorded in Camden, New Jersey on 18 September 1914.
