= Chinese cruiser Hai Chi =

Protected cruiser of the Imperial Chinese Navy

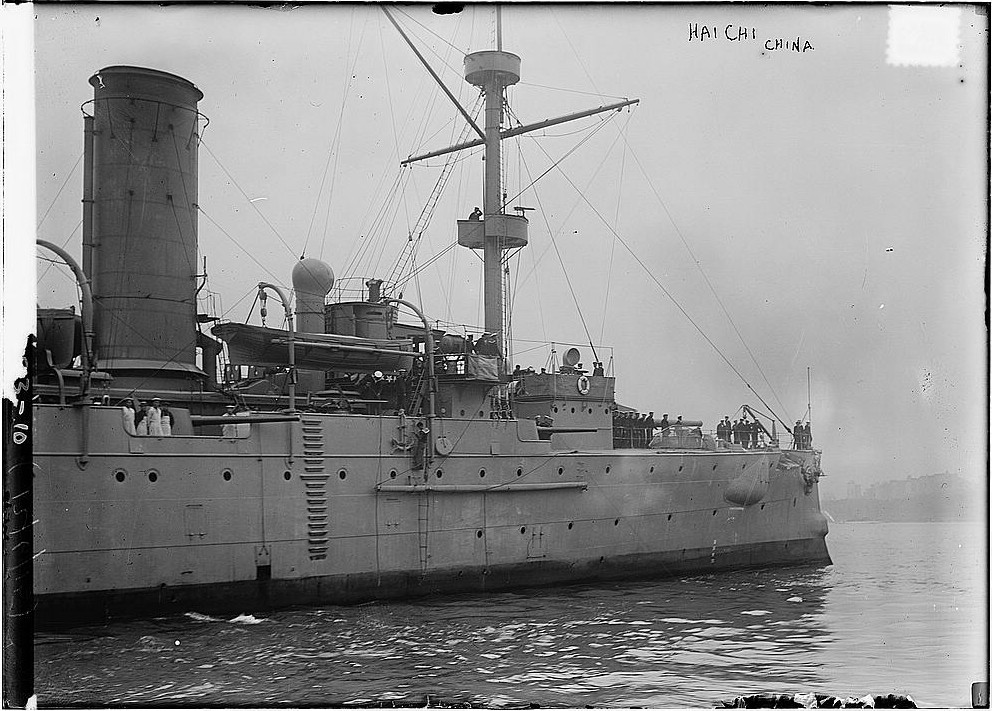
- Hai Chi on 11 September 1911 in New York City

History

China
- Name: Hai Chi
- Builder: Armstrong Whitworth, Low Walker
- Laid down: 11 November 1896
- Launched: 24 January 1898
- Completed: 10 May 1899
- Fate: Scuttled 11 August 1937

General characteristics
- Class & type: Hai Chi-class protected cruiser
- Displacement: 4,300 t (4,232 long tons)
- Length: 129.3 m (424 ft)
- Beam: 14.3 m (47 ft)
- Draught: 6.1 m (20 ft)
- Speed: 24 knots (28 mph; 44 km/h)
- Complement: 476
- Armament: 2 × 8-inch (203 mm)/45 guns; 10 x 4.7 in (120 mm)/45 guns; 16 x 47mm Hotchkiss/40 guns

Hai Chi (Chinese: 海圻; pinyin: Hǎi Qí; lit. 'Boundary of the Sea') was a Hai Chi-class protected cruiser of the Imperial Chinese Navy. She was at the time the largest warship in Imperial China with a displacement of 4,300 tons and was armed with two 8-inch (203 mm) guns and a top speed of 24 knots (44 km/h; 28 mph). She subsequently served in the Republic of China Navy, before being scuttled in 1937. The hull of the vessel was raised in 1960 and subsequently broken up.

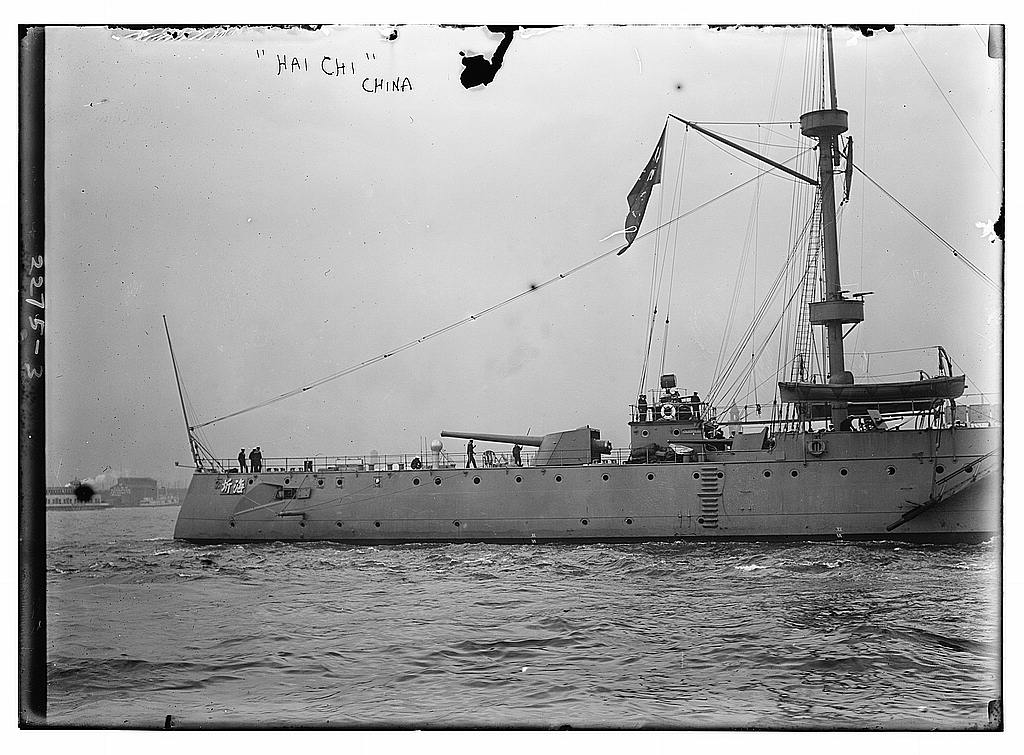
Hai Chi on 11 September 1911 in New York City

== History ==
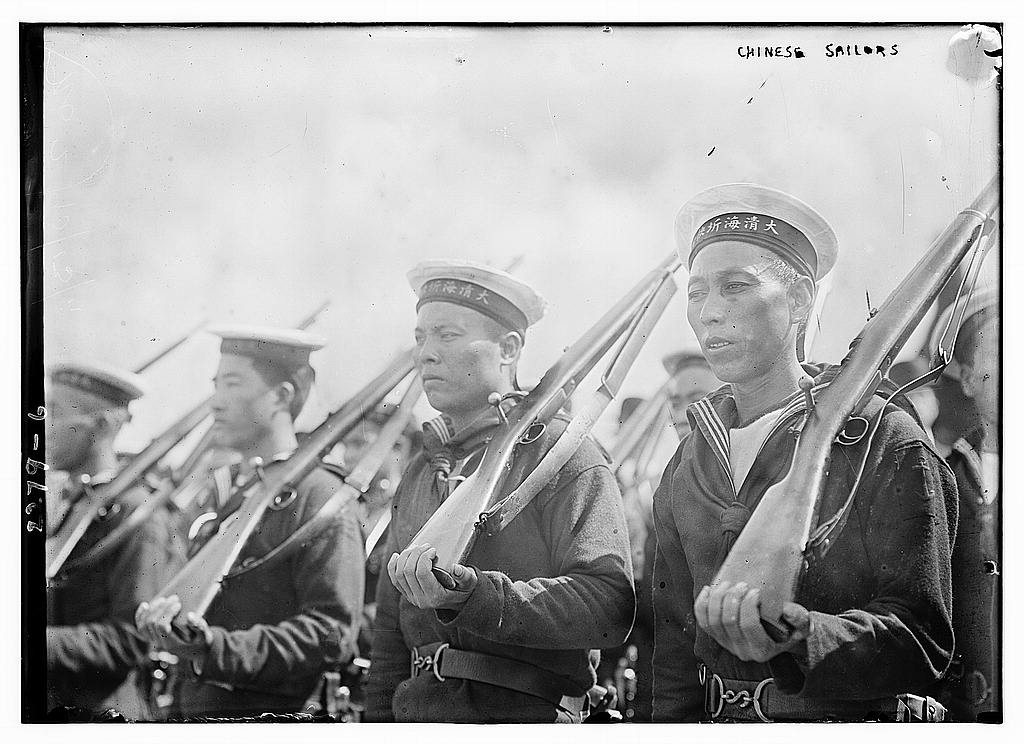
Sailors from Hai Chi on parade in New York.

Hai Chi was built in 1897 by Armstrong Whitworth in Newcastle upon Tyne.

In 1911, Hai Chi visited the United Kingdom to participate in the fleet review held to mark George V's coronation. It also visited Newcastle for an electrical refitting at Armstrong Whitworth. Due to the occurrence of the Torreón massacre in Mexico, its mission was extended to include a visit to the United States, Cuba and Mexico. On 11 September 1911, she was the first Imperial Chinese Navy vessel in American waters. While the ship was in Cuba, Mexico agreed to Chinese demands for reparations and action against the rebels, and the last leg of the ship's mission was cancelled. Hai Chi sailed home and arrived to a new government, the Republic of China having replaced the Qing empire while the ship was away.

Hai Chi served in the Republic of China Navy thereafter. In 1917 it was part of the fleet which joined Sun Yat-sen's Constitutional Protection Movement against the Beijing government. In 1923 it returned to the north, but in 1926 joined the Fengtian faction of Zhang Zuolin, in Manchuria. After the loss of Manchuria to Japan in the Mukden Incident in 1931, Hai Chi moved to Qingdao along with the rest of the Fengtian navy and became part of the ROC Navy's 3rd Fleet. In 1933, due to a dispute with the fleet commander over pay and expenses, Hai Chi along with two ships travelled south and joined the Guangdong navy. In 1935, due to a dispute with the governor of Guangdong province, Hai Chi together with another ship fought its way past a blockade to reach Hong Kong, and eventually to the capital Nanjing, where (as a compromise) they were nominally returned to the Third Fleet, but in reality came under the direct command of the ministry of defence.

The ship was scuttled as a blockship in the Yangtze River on 11 August 1937 to obstruct the Japanese advance in the Second Sino-Japanese War. Her main guns were dismantled before she was scuttled and installed in the river defences of Wuhan.

Later, in 1960, the hull was raised for scrapping, and subsequently broken up.
