= Historical Chinese anthems =

National anthems of the Qing dynasty and Republic of China

Historical Chinese anthems comprise a number of official and unofficial national anthems of China composed during the Qing dynasty and the Republic of China.

"Chinese national anthem" may refer to:

- "March of the Volunteers" of the People's Republic of China
- (Taiwan) "National Anthem of the Republic of China" of the Republic of China
  - "National Flag Anthem of the Republic of China", used by the ROC as Chinese Taipei since 1983

== Tune of Li Zhongtang ==
Quasi-official

In 1896, for purposes of diplomatic missions to Western Europe and Russia, Li Hongzhang (Zhongtang being a term of respect for a vizier or prime minister) employed in political lyrics combined with classical Chinese music to create a song later known as the "Tune of Li Zhongtang" (李中堂樂).

金殿當頭紫閣重，
仙人掌上玉芙蓉，
太平天子朝天日，
五色雲車駕六龍。

With a golden palace above his head, and fold upon fold of purple pavilions,
Like a jade hibiscus on the palm of an immortal,
The Son of Heaven of Perfect Peace pays homage to the sun in the sky,
Riding on a five-coloured car of cloud pulled by six dragons.

== Praise the Dragon Flag ==
Quasi-official

After the Department of the Army was established in 1906, Praise the Dragon Flag became the army song, and has been played at formal occasions overseas.

於斯萬年，
亞東大帝國！
山岳縱橫獨立幟，
江河漫延文明波；
四百兆¹民神明冑，
地大物產博。
揚我黃龍帝國徽，
唱我帝國歌！

Here for ten thousand years,
Great Empire of East Asia!
The criss-crossing mountains stand alone,
The wide-spreading rivers are the waves of the civilization;
Four hundred million¹ people under the auspice of the gods,
The land is large and the produce great.
Wave my yellow dragon emblem of the Empire,
Sing the song of our Empire!

¹ 兆 usually means one trillion (10^{12}), but it could mean one million (10^{6}), and should have that value here in the song for factual accuracy. See Chinese numerals for details.

== Cup of Solid Gold (1911–1912) ==
Official

Cup of Solid Gold became the first official national anthem of the Qing Empire in less than a week when the Wuchang Uprising occurred in 1911. It lasted for about four months until the end of the empire and the establishment of the Republic of China. It is in classical Chinese.

== Song of Five Races Under One Union ==
Provisional

After the establishment of the provisional government in Nanjing, the Ministry of Education under Cai Yuanpei asked the public for possible anthems (as well as coats of arms), and "Song of Five Races under One Union" (五旗共和歌), with lyrics by Shen Enfu (沈恩孚) and music by Shen Pengnian (沈彭年), was released as a draft in the newspaper.

亞東開化中華早，
揖美追歐，
舊邦新造。

飄揚五色旗，
民國榮光，
錦繡山河普照。

我同胞，
鼓舞文明，
世界和平永保。

Yà dōng kāihuà zhōnghuá zǎo,
yī měi zhuī ōu,
jiù bāng xīnzào.

Piāoyáng wǔsè qí,
mínguó róngguāng,
jǐnxiù shānhé pǔzhào.

Wǒ tóngbāo,
gǔwǔ wénmíng,
shìjiè hépíng yǒngbǎo.

China, East Asia’s earliest civilisation,
Admiring America while chasing Europe,
As the old nation is being rebuilt.
The Five Colored Flag flutters high,
The Glory of the Republic
shines over its beautiful mountains and rivers.
My fellow compatriots,
let us all invigorate our civilisation,
so that peace is protected for the whole world.

== How Great is Our China! ==
Unofficial

Also called "Patriotic Song" (愛國歌), "How Great is Our China!" (泱泱哉，我中華！) has lyrics written by Liang Qichao and music by overseas Chinese at Datong School (大同學校), Yokohama. Released in 1912, it became quite popular, especially among students.

| Chinese | Transliteration | Translation |
|---|---|---|
| 泱泱哉，我中華！ | Yāng yāng zāi, wǒ zhōng huá! | How great is our China! |
| 最大洲中最大國， | Zuì dà zhōu zhōng zuì dà guó, | The largest nation of the largest continent. |
| 廿二行省為一家， | niàn èr háng shěng wéi yī jiā, | Twenty-two administered provinces are one family. |
| 物產腴沃甲天地 | wù chǎn yú wò jiǎ tiāndì, | Rich products and fertile land are the first in the world. |
| 天府雄國言非誇。 | tiān fǔ xióng guó yán fēi kuā. | Calling this strong nation heaven on earth is not boasting. |
| 君不見英日區區三島尚掘起， | Jūn bù jiàn yīng rì qū qū sān dǎo shàng jué qǐ, | Don't you see: Britain and Japan, only three islands, still prosper. |
| 況乃堂堂我中華！ | kuàng nǎi táng táng wǒ zhōng huá! | How much more our great China? |
| 結成團體， | Jié chéng tuán tǐ, | Join as one body. |
| 振我精神， | zhèn wǒ jīng shén | Excite our spirit. |
| 二十世紀新世界， | èr shí shì jì xīn shì jiè, | In this new world of the twentieth century, |
| 雄飛宇內疇與倫？ | xióng fēi yǔ nèi chóu yǔ lún? | Strongly soar among fellow mankind of the universe. |
| 可愛哉，我國民！ | Kě'ài zāi, wǒ guó mín! | How lovely is our people! |
| 可愛哉，我國民！ | Kě'ài zāi, wǒ guó mín! | How lovely is our people! |

== Song to the Auspicious Cloud (1913–1928) ==
Official

The Song to the Auspicious Cloud has two versions, one used in 1913 and another after 1920.

=== First version ===
On April 8, 1913, this national anthem was used in the opening ceremony of the 1st Regular Council; the last line was added by Wang Baorong (汪寶榮), with other lines from Shang Shu; it was set to music by Jeans Hautstont.

卿雲爛兮﹑
糺縵縵兮﹐
日月光華﹐
旦復旦兮。
時哉夫，天下非一人之天下也。

How bright is the Auspicious Cloud!
How broad is the brilliancy!
The light is spectacular with sun or moon.
How it revives dawn after dawn!
Now, the country isn't one man's country.

=== Second version ===
In November 1919, Duan Qirui established the National Anthem Research Committee (國歌研究會), which adopted:

- The lyrics (1920) by Zhang Taiyan (章太炎) from the classic "The Song to the Auspicious Cloud" (卿雲歌) from the Book of Documents.
- The music (1921) by Beijing professor, Xiao Youmei (蕭友梅).

The anthem was released in July 1921 by the Department of National Affairs (國務院).

卿雲爛兮﹑
糺¹縵縵兮﹐
日月光華﹐
旦復旦兮。

How bright is the Auspicious Cloud!
How broad is the brilliancy!
The light is spectacular with sun or moon.
How it revives dawn after dawn!

¹糺 (jiū "collaborate") is sometimes written as 糾 (jiū "investigate") or 織 (zhī "to web")

== China Heroically Stands in the Universe (1915–1921) ==
Official

After general Yuan Shikai became head of state, the Ritual Regulations Office (禮制館) issued the new official anthem, China Heroically Stands in the Universe (中國雄立宇宙間) in June 1915. Its lyrics were written by Yin Chang (廕昌) and music by Wang Lu (王露).

中國雄立宇宙間﹐
廓八埏﹐
華冑來從崑崙巔﹐
江河浩盪山綿連﹐
共和五族開堯天﹐
億萬年。

China heroically stands in Universe,
Extends to the Eight Corners,
The famous descendant from Kunlun Peak.
The rivers turn greatly, the mountains continuous.
Five nationalities open up the sky of Yao,
For millions of myriads of years.

== Song of the National Revolution ==
Provisional

Written by officers of the Whampoa Military Academy, the "Revolution of the Citizens" song (國民革命歌, Guomin Geming Ge), sung to the tune of "Frère Jacques (commonly known as "Two Tigers" in China)," was released on July 1, 1926.

打倒列強，打倒列強，
除軍閥，除軍閥；
努力國民革命，努力國民革命，
齊奮鬥，齊奮鬥。

工農學兵，工農學兵，
大聯合！大聯合！
打倒帝國主義，打倒帝國主義，
齊奮鬥，齊奮鬥。

打倒列強， 打倒列強，
除軍閥 ， 除軍閥；
國民革命成功，國民革命成功，
齊歡唱，齊歡唱。

Dǎdǎo lièqiáng, dǎdǎo lièqiáng,
chú jūnfá, chú jūnfá;
nǔlì guómín gémìng, nǔlì guómín gémìng,
qí fèndòu, qí fèndòu.

Gōng nóngxué bīng, gōng nóngxué bīng,
dà liánhé! Dà liánhé!
Dǎdǎo dìguó zhǔyì, dǎdǎo dìguó zhǔyì,
qí fèndòu, qí fèndòu.

Dǎdǎo lièqiáng, dǎdǎo lièqiáng,
chú jūnfá, chú jūnfá;
guómín gémìng chénggōng, guómín gémìng chénggōng,
qí huān chàng, qí huān chàng.

Overthrow the foreign Powers, × 2
Eliminate the warlords; × 2
The citizens strive hard for the Revolution, × 2
Joint affair to fight. × 2

Laborers, farmers, students, and soldiers, × 2
Make a great union! × 2
Overthrow the imperialism, × 2
Joint affair to fight. × 2

Overthrow the foreign Powers, × 2
Eliminate the warlords; × 2
The Revolution is successful; ×2
Joyfully sing in unison. ×2

== The Internationale ==
When the Chinese Soviet Republic was established in 1931, The Internationale in Chinese was decided to be its national anthem, since it followed the ideals of communism, especially the Soviet Union.

== See also ==
- "National Flag Anthem of the Republic of China"
- "Ode to the Motherland"
- Tibetan National Anthem
- National Anthem of Manchukuo
