= Chinese cruiser Nan Shui =

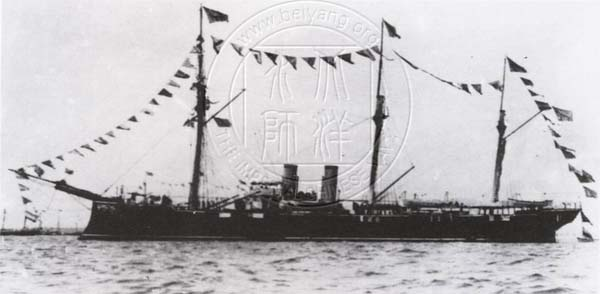
- Nan Shui

History

Imperial China
- Name: Nan Shui
- Ordered: Early 1883
- Builder: Howaldtswerke-Deutsche Werft, Kiel, Germany
- Launched: 8 January 1884
- Decommissioned: 1903
- Fate: Sold as scrap, 1906

General characteristics
- Type: Nan Chen-class unprotected cruiser
- Displacement: 2,200 long tons (2,200 t)
- Length: 275.5 ft (84.0 m)
- Beam: 37.5 ft (11.4 m)
- Draft: 15 ft (4.6 m)
- Propulsion: Compound-expansion steam engine, two screws; 8 × boilers
- Speed: 15 kn (28 km/h; 17 mph)
- Capacity: 600 tons of coal
- Complement: 250
- Armament: 2 × 8.2 in (21 cm) Armstrong guns; 8 × 4.7 in (12 cm) Armstrong guns; 2 × 37.5 mm (1.48 in) machine guns; Naval ram
- Armor: Cork belt at waterline

Nan Shui (Chinese: 南瑞; pinyin: Nánruì; lit. 'Blessing of the South') was an unprotected cruiser built for the Imperial Chinese Navy. She was built by Howaldtswerke-Deutsche Werft, Kiel, Germany, while her armament was installed by Armstrong Whitworth, Elswick, England. She, alongside her sister vessel Nan Chen, which was based on the design of the cruiser Kai Chi. Nan Shui was considered to be obsolete by the Western Powers even at the time of her construction.

She was active during the Sino-French War of 1884–1885, first as part of a defensive squadron based at Nanking (now Nanjing). Nan Shui then formed part of the cruiser force of the Chinese squadron sent to engage the French blockade of Formosa (now Taiwan) which resulted in the Battle of Shipu. Following the battle, Nan Shui was blockaded into the port of Ningpo (now Ningbo) until the end of the war. She was eventually decommissioned in 1903, and was sold as scrap in 1906.

== Design and description ==
The Nan Chen-class unprotected cruisers were intended to be of relatively simple design compared to other Imperial Chinese Navy vessels on order from European shipyards at the time. They were similar to the cruiser Kai Chi, but constructed out of steel instead of wood. Both Nan Shui and her sister vessel, Nan Chen, were obsolete during construction; the Chinese navy had also commissioned armored and protected cruisers, such as Zhiyuan.

Nan Shui was 275.5 feet (84.0 metres) long overall. She had a beam of 37.5 ft (11.4 m) and a draft of 15 ft (4.6 m). Zhiyuen displaced 2,200 long tons (2,200 tonnes), and carried a crew of 250 officers and enlisted men. She was unarmored with the exception of a cork belt installed at the waterline of the ship. Unlike Kai Chi, on which the class was based, Nan Shui had two funnels instead of one. Both ships of the class were equipped with a naval ram, and had raised forecastles and poop decks. She was powered by a compound-expansion steam engine with eight boilers, driving a single shaft. This provided 2,400 indicated horsepower (1,800 kW) for a top speed of 15 knots (28 km/h; 17 mph).

Her initial armament consisted of two 8.2 in (21 cm) breach-loading Armstrong guns, alongside eight 4.7-inch (12 cm) breach-loading Armstrong guns and some Hotchkiss guns. The two larger guns were mounted in sponsons ahead of the funnels, while the smaller Armstrongs were placed amidships as a broadside, on the forecastle and poop deck and in further sponsons ahead of the poop. Although the ship was launched in Germany, that armament was added by Armstrong Whitworth while Nan Chen was at its shipyard in Elswick, England. By 1884, she was equipped with a torpedo boat.

== Service history ==
Two cruisers were ordered from Howaldtswerke-Deutsche Werft, Kiel, Germany, in early 1883. At the time of the launch of Nan Shui on 8 January 1884, the Germany authorities were preventing some of the Chinese construction from leaving the country such as the Dingyuan-class ironclads due to the impending Sino-French War. Nan Shui was thus secretly delivered to China. Both Nan Chen and her sister were sent to the Kiangnan Arsenal to be reinforced. Despite these issues, and their obsolescence, the German-built cruisers were held in high esteem by the Chinese authorities.

=== Sino-French War ===
After the start of the war in August 1884, Nan Chen and Nan Shui were sent to protect Nanking (now Nanjing) alongside Kai Chi. An attack was thought to be imminent, but the French Navy instead assaulted Formosa (now Taiwan) where they established a blockade. Chinese forces were gathered to drive off the blockade of the island, which comprised the two Nan Chen-class cruisers, Kai Chi, the frigate Yuyuen and the sloop-of-war Teng Ching. The squadron was under the command of Admiral Wu Ang-k'ang. The five ships gathered in Shanghai, leaving in December 1884. They took some time to work up their crews, and did not seek to engage the French immediately, only finally meeting them in the following February.

The Chinese forces attached in a V-shaped formation, being led by Kai Chi as flagship. However, they immediately realised they were outgunned by the French forces and withdrew. While the slower Yuyuen and Teng Ching retreated into Shipu Bay after losing the three cruisers in the fog, which resulted in the Battle of Shipu. Nan Chen, Nan Shui and Kai Chi sailed north to the port of Ningpo (now Ningbo) where they were joined by the sloop-of-war Teng Chao Wu and the transport Yuan-k'ai. All five ships were then blockaded into the port by the French Navy squadron. While some exchanges of fire were conducted in March 1885, this was the last involvement of Nan Shui during the war.

=== Fate ===
During the First Sino-Japanese War, Nan Chen and Nan Shui were sent to the Taiwan strait for patrol duties. She was eventually decommissioned in 1903, and was sold as scrap in 1906.
