= List of shipwrecks in February 1885 =

The list of shipwrecks in February 1885 includes ships sunk, foundered, grounded, or otherwise lost during February 1885.

== 1 February ==
List of shipwrecks: 1 February 1885
Ship	State	Description
Petrellen	Norway	The barquentine was abandoned off Long Rock, Cornwall, United Kingdom. The Penzance lifeboat Dora ( Royal National Lifeboat Institution), on the lifeboat's first rescue, took eight of the vessel's ten crew off on 31 January and left her riding at anchor. Her captain and mate remained on board. Her crew returned the next day and she was beached near Chyandour, Cornwall.
Pharos	United Kingdom	The steamship ran aground on the Sintyar Reef, in the Red Sea. Her crew were rescued by the aviso Vedetta (Regia Marina). Pharos was refloated on 7 February with assistance from the steamship Midge ( (Aden Colony) Aden Settlement) and taken in to Perim, Aden Settlement.

== 3 February ==
List of shipwrecks: 3 February 1885
Ship	State	Description
Foyle	United Kingdom	The steamship sank at Newport, Monmouthshire. She was refloated.

== 4 February ==
List of shipwrecks: 4 February 1885
Ship	State	Description
Alexandra Nichol	United Kingdom	The schooner collided with the schooner Greenwich (United Kingdom) 8 nautical miles (15 km) off Spurn Point, Yorkshire and was severely damaged. Her crew were rescued by Wilhelmina (United Kingdom). Alexandra Nichol was on a voyage from Aberdeen to London. She was subsequently reboarded by her crew and was assisted in to Grimsby, Lincolnshire by the tug Conqueror (United Kingdom).
Empress	United Kingdom	The smack was driven ashore at Winterton-on-Sea, Norfolk.

== 5 February ==
List of shipwrecks: 5 February 1885
Ship	State	Description
Eleanor	United Kingdom	The schooner ran aground on the Pennington Spit, in the Solent. She was on a voyage from Sunderland, County Durham to Salcombe, Devon.
Justicia	United Kingdom	The steamship struck a rock and foundered off Pamadure, Ceylon. All on board were rescued. She was on a voyage from Calcutta, India to London.
Wave	United Kingdom	The schooner was driven ashore and wrecked 4 nautical miles (7.4 km) east of Dunbar, Lothian. Her crew survived. She was on a voyage from Dundee, Forfarshire to Newcastle upon Tyne, Northumberland.

== 6 February ==
List of shipwrecks: 6 February 1885
Ship	State	Description
Francesco	Italy	The barque foundered in the Atlantic Ocean. Her crew were rescued by the barque Svea (Sweden). Francesco was on a voyage from New York, United States to Seville, Spain.
Helios	Austria-Hungary	The steamship ran aground off Gallipoli, Ottoman Empire. She was on a voyage from Constantinople, Ottoman Empire to Alexandria, Egypt.
Spanker	United Kingdom	The barque was driven ashore and wrecked at Harlech, Caernarfonshire with the loss of four of her crew. She was on a voyage from Jamaica to Liverpool, Lancashire.

== 7 February ==
List of shipwrecks: 7 February 1885
Ship	State	Description
Laurvig	Norway	The schooner was abandoned in the Atlantic Ocean. Her crew were rescued by the barque Euterpe (Germany). Laurvig was on a voyage from Galveston, Texas, United States to Falmouth, Cornwall, United Kingdom.
Solano	United Kingdom	The ship was driven ashore in the Sea of Marmara at Cape Hevacler, Ottoman Empire. She subsequently became a wreck.

== 8 February ==
List of shipwrecks: 8 February 1885
Ship	State	Description
Castello	United Kingdom	The steamship was driven ashore at "Tamsoo". She was on a voyage from Hiogo, Japan to Hong Kong. She subsequently became a wreck.
Lizzie	United Kingdom	The ship was driven ashore at Boulogne, Pas-de-Calais, France. She was on a voyage from Penryn, Cornwall to Boulogne. She was later refloated.

== 9 February ==
List of shipwrecks: 9 February 1885
Ship	State	Description
Solomon Poole	United States	The fishing schooner sank in a gale on the Grand Banks of Newfoundland. Lost with all fourteen crew.

== 10 February ==
List of shipwrecks: 10 February 1885
Ship	State	Description
Cowslip	United Kingdom	The ship sprang a leak and was abandoned in the Atlantic Ocean off the Outer Hebrides. She was on a voyage from Sunderland, County Durham to a Spanish port.
Dannebrog, and Zoe	Norway; United Kingdom	The barque Dannebrog collided with the steamship Zoe 20 nautical miles (37 km) east of Gibraltar. Both vessels sank. Their crews were rescued by the steamship City of Malaga (United Kingdom). Dannebrog was on a voyage from Marseille, Bouches-du-Rhône, France to Montevideo, Uruguay. Zoe was on a voyage from London to Odesa, Russia.

== 13 February ==
List of shipwrecks: 13 February 1885
Ship	State	Description
Alphonso XII	Spain	The steamship struck a rock off Point Gaudo, Gran Canaria and sank. All on board were rescued. She was on a voyage from Cádiz to Havana, Cuba.
Maid of Orleans	United Kingdom	The tug sprang a leak and sank off the Isle of Arran. Her five crew survived.
Yarra Yarra	United Kingdom	The ship deoarted from Astoria, Oregon, United States for Queenstown, County Cork. No further trace, reported missing.

== 14 February ==
List of shipwrecks: 14 February 1885
Ship	State	Description
Haytian	United Kingdom	The ship was damaged by fire at sea. She was on a voyage from New Orleans, Louisiana, United States to Liverpool, Lancashire.

== 15 February ==
List of shipwrecks: 15 February 1885
Ship	State	Description
Chambese	United Kingdom	The steamship ran aground 6 nautical miles (11 km) from Lødingen, Norway. She was on a voyage from Newcastle upon Tyne, Northumberland to Tromsø, Norway.
RMS Humber	United Kingdom	The steamship departed from New York, United States for London. Although sighted two or three days later, she subsequently foundered with the loss of all 66 people on board.
Teng Ch'ing	Imperial Chinese Navy	Sino-French War, Battle of Shipu: The sloop-of-war was sunk in Shipu Bay near Ningbo by spar torpedoes employed by two torpedo boats from the ironclad Bayard (French Navy).
Yuyuen	Imperial Chinese Navy	French Navy torpedo boat attacking Yuyuen Sino-French War, Battle of Shipu: The frigate was sunk in Shipu Bay near Ningbo by spar torpedoes employed by two torpedo boats from the ironclad Bayard (French Navy).

== 16 February ==
List of shipwrecks: 16 February 1885
Ship	State	Description
Holmhurst	United Kingdom	The cargo ship collided with Westerland (Belgium) and foundered 7 nautical miles (13 km) south of the Eddystone Lighthouse, Cornwall with the loss of four of her crew. Holmhurst was on a voyage from Fleetwood, Lancashire to Cowes, Isle of Wight.
Maria Brockleman	United Kingdom	The brig ran aground at Drogheda, County Louth. She was refloated on 18 February and taken in to Drogheda.

== 17 February ==
List of shipwrecks: 17 February 1885
Ship	State	Description
Eastcourt	United Kingdom	The Thames barge was run into by the steamship Ella (United Kingdom) and sank at Rotherhithe, Surrey.

== 18 February ==
List of shipwrecks: 18 February 1885
Ship	State	Description
Durham	United Kingdom	The ship was severely damaged by fire at Hull, Yorkshire.
Elizabeth	Sweden	The barque was abandoned in the Atlantic Ocean (31°25′N 59°40′W). Her crew were rescued by Twilight (United Kingdom). Elizabeth was on a voyage from Pensacola, Florida, United States to Bilbao, Spain.

== 20 February ==
List of shipwrecks: 20 February 1885
Ship	State	Description
Camilla	United Kingdom	The brigantine was wrecked in Tramore Bay with the loss of all nine crew.
Margaret Jane Swift	United Kingdom	The brigantine ran aground at Poole, Dorset and was wrecked. Her crew survived. She was on a voyage from Sunderland, County Durham to Poole.
Rosendale	United Kingdom	The schooner was driven onto the breakwater at Holyhead, Anglesey and was wrecked. Her crew survived.
Succeed	United Kingdom	The fishing dandy collided with the fishing dandy Proceed (United Kingdom) and sank 18 nautical miles (33 km) off Cromer, Norfolk. Her crew were rescued by Proceed.
Venus	United Kingdom	The vessel went ashore and broke up on the Longcliff rocks, County Waterford, with the probable loss of her crew.
Unnamed	Austria-Hungary	The barque was driven ashore on the coast of County Waterford with the loss of her fifteen crew.
Unnamed	Flag unknown	The steamship was driven ashore at Creadenhead, County Waterford.

== 21 February ==
List of shipwrecks: 21 February 1885
Ship	State	Description
Camellia	United Kingdom	The brig was driven ashore and wrecked at Waterford.
Camilla	United Kingdom	The brigantine was driven ashore and wrecked in Tramore Bay with the loss of all five crew. She was on a voyage from Newport, Monmouthshire to Cork.
Elizabeth	Denmark	The smack was driven ashore near Kirkwall, Orkney Islands, United Kingdom.
Jung Frau	United Kingdom	The hulk was being towed from Liverpool, Lancashire to Bristol, Gloucestershire by the tug Flying Kestrel (United Kingdom). The tow was lost 6 nautical miles (11 km) off the South Stack, Anglesey and her crew were taken off by Flying Kestrel. Jung Frau was subsequently discovered by Tynwald ( (United Kingdom of Great Britain and Ireland) Isle of Man), which towed her in to Douglas, Isle of Man.
Margaret and Ann	United Kingdom	The fishing boat foundered in the North Sea with the loss of all hands.
Milina	United Kingdom	The ship departed from Sunderland, County Durham for Port Gordon, Moray. No further trace, reported missing.
Red Rover	United Kingdom	The ship broke from her moorings and was beached at Kirkcudbright. She was on a voyage from Workington, Cumberland to Poole, Dorset.
Rosendale	United Kingdom	The schooner struck the breakwater at Holyhead, Anglesey and was wrecked. Her crew were rescued by rocket apparatus.

== 22 February ==
List of shipwrecks: 22 February 1885
Ship	State	Description
Blue Bell	United Kingdom	The ship foundered off Peterhead, Aberdeenshire with the loss of all five crew.
Dewi Lass	United Kingdom	The schooner ran aground on the Longnose Rocks, Kingsgate, Kent. She was on a voyage from Aberdovey, Merionethshire to London. She was refloated with assistance from the Coastguard and taken in to Ramsgate, Kent in a leaky condition.
Empress of India	United Kingdom	The ketch was driven ashore at Hartlepool, County Durham with the loss of a crew member. She was on a voyage from Great Yarmouth, Norfolk to Seaham, County Durham. She was refloated and towed in to Hartlepool.
Gloriosa	United Kingdom	The derelict ship was towed in to Douglas, Isle of Man by the steamship Tynwald ( (United Kingdom of Great Britain and Ireland) Isle of Man).
Governor	United Kingdom	The Mersey Flat sank at Liverpool, Lancashire. Her crew were rescued.
Harraton	United Kingdom	The steamship collided with the quayside at Sunderland, County Durham and was beached. She was on a voyage from London to Sunderland.
Maria Anna	United Kingdom	The brigantine was driven ashore and wrecked at Inch Point, County Kerry. Her crew were rescued. She was on a voyage from Swansea, Glamorgan to Ballynakill, County Kerry.
Mary and Eliza	United Kingdom	The schooner was driven ashore and wrecked near Port Logan, Wigtownshire with the loss of two of her four crew.
Observant	Norway	The barque was abandoned in the Atlantic Ocean. She was on a voyage from Galveston, Texas, United States to Liverpool.
Turbot	United Kingdom	The tug sank at Liverpool.
Vale of Calder	United Kingdom	The steamship foundered 10 nautical miles (19 km) west of Bardsey Island, Pembrokeshire. All 21 people on board took to the ship's boat and were rescued by the steamship Cheerful (United Kingdom). Vale of Calder was on a voyage from Liverpool, Lancashire to Limerick.
Venus B.	Austria-Hungary	The barque was driven ashore and wrecked at Ballymacon, County Waterford, United Kingdom with the loss of all hands, fifteen or seventeen lives.

== 23 February ==
List of shipwrecks: 23 February 1885
Ship	State	Description
Eller Water	United Kingdom	The ship collided with the barquentine Uncle Ned (United Kingdom) and was severely damaged. Eller Water was towed in to Holyhead, Anglesey in a sinking condition.
Napoleon III	Norway	The barque was abandoned in the North Sea. Her crew were rescued by the fishing smack Fawn (United Kingdom). Napoleon III was on a voyage from Larvik to Newcastle upon Tyne, Northumberland, United Kingdom.

== 24 February ==
List of shipwrecks: 24 February 1885
Ship	State	Description
Eliza	United Kingdom	The Thames barge sprang a leak and sank in the River Thames at Northfleet, Kent. She was on a voyage from Milton Regis, Kent to London.
Henry	United Kingdom	The Thames barge was run into by the steamship Tay (United Kingdom) and sank at Blackwall, Middlesex. Her crew survived.
Live Oak	United Kingdom	The ship was sighted whilst on a voyage from Garston, Lancashire to Rosario, Brazil. No further trace, reported overdue.
Kirkwood	United Kingdom	The ship was abandoned at sea. Her crew were rescued by the steamship Barrowmore (Flag unknown). Kirkwood was on a voyage from Astoria to Liverpool, Lancashire.

== 25 February ==
List of shipwrecks: 25 February 1885
Ship	State	Description
Argo	France	The steamship was wrecked in a hurricane at Tamatave, Madagascar.
Armide	United Kingdom	The ship was wrecked in a hurricane at Tamatave.
Clémence	France	The ship was wrecked in a hurricane at Tamatave.
Oise	French Navy	The transport ship was wrecked in a hurricane at Tamatave.
Portnichet	France	The ship was wrecked in a hurricane on a reef north of Madagascar.
Royal Dane, and Virgo	United Kingdom	The steamships collided in the River Thames at Northfleet, Kent and were both severely damaged. Both vessels were beached. Royal Dane was on a voyage from London to Newcastle upon Tyne, Northumberland. Virgo was on a voyage from Hamburg, Germany to London. She was refloated.
Sarah Hobart	United States	The barque was wrecked in a hurricane at Tamatave.
Six unnamed vessels	Flags unknown	The ships sank in a hurricane at St Mary's, Madagascar.

== 27 February ==
List of shipwrecks: 27 February 1885
Ship	State	Description
Marseille	United Kingdom	The steamship ran aground in the Seine. She was on a voyage from Rouen. Seine-Inférieure, France to Rotterdam, South Holland, Netherlands. She was refloated and taken in to Havre de Grâce, Seine-Inférieure in a leaky condition.
Norden	Sweden	The steamship collided with the steamship Cumberland (United Kingdom) and sank near Cuxhaven, Germany. Six of her crew were rescued, 21 were reported missing.
North American	United Kingdom	The ship was sighted whilst on a voyage from Melbourne, Victoria to London. No further trace, reported missing.
Valetta	United Kingdom	The steamship sprang a leak and was abandoned 10 nautical miles (19 km) south of the Mumbles, Glamorgan. Her crew survived. She was on a voyage from Cardiff, Glamorgan to Dublin.
Wicklow	United Kingdom	The steamship collided with the steamship Amphion (United Kingdom) and sank off Portpatrick, Wigtownshire. All on board were rescued.

== 28 February ==
List of shipwrecks: 28 February 1885
Ship	State	Description
Blanche	United Kingdom	The steamship was run into by the steamship Tay (United Kingdom) and sank in the River Carron. Blanche was on a voyage from Grangemouth, Stirlingshire to Hartlepool, County Durham.

== Unknown date ==
List of shipwrecks: Unknown date in February 1885
Ship	State	Description
Abercarne	United Kingdom	The barque was holed by her anchor at Swansea, Glamorgan and was beached. She was on a voyage from Port Nolloth, Cape Colony to Swansea.
Ann	United Kingdom	The sloop ran into the brig Castle Eden (United Kingdom) and sank in the Humber at Hull, Yorkshire.
Astrea	Denmark	The schooner ran aground at Hirtshals. She was on a voyage from "Falkenburg" to London, United Kingdom. She was refloated and taken in to Fredrikshavn in a leaky condition.
Avenir	France	The chasse-marée collided with a tug and sank at Bordeaux, Gironde.
Ben Nevis	United Kingdom	The steamship ran aground in the Scheldt. She was on a voyage from Antwerp, Belgium to Sunderland, County Durham.
Bianca Cazanova	Italy	The barque was driven ashore at Cardiff, Glamorgan, United Kingdom. She was on a voyage from Cardiff to Genoa.
Burdigala	France	The barque was driven ashore and wrecked near the Carbonera Lighthouse, Spain.
Cholon	United Kingdom	The ship ran aground on the Ahlone Sands, off the coast of Burma and was wrecked.
Clytie	United Kingdom	The ship was wrecked on the Serrano Reef. She was on a voyage from Pensacola, Florida, United States to Aspinwall, United States of Colombia.
Cynthia	United Kingdom	The ship was driven ashore and wrecked 2 nautical miles (3.7 km) north of Port William, Wigtownshire. Her crew were rescued. She was on a voyage from Samarang, Netherlands East Indies to Greenock, Renfrewshire.
Cypriana	United Kingdom	The ship ran aground on the Spijkerplaat, in the Scheldt. She was on a voyage from London to Antwerp.
Deanfield	United Kingdom	The ship was driven ashore at "Chinabuckeer". She was on a voyage from Diamond Island to Rangoon, Burma.
Egret	Flag unknown	The steamship was driven ashore in the Zuyder Zee. She subsequentoy caught fire and was scuttled.
Eldorado	United Kingdom	The steamship was wrecked on the Berlengas, Portugal.
Emile	France	The ship was abandoned in the Atlantic Ocean before 20 February.
Emily	United Kingdom	The steamship collided with another vessel and sank in the Seine. She was on a voyage from London to Paris, France.
Emily	United Kingdom	The schooner sprang a leak. She was beached at Grimsby, Lincolnshire with assistance from the tug May (United Kingdom). Emily was on a voyage from Seaham, County Durham to Lowestoft, Suffolk.
Erinna	United Kingdom	The ship was abandoned at sea. Her crew were rescued by Deerhound (United Kingdom).
Euphemia A. Hayes	United States	The ship was driven ashore at Point Pleasant, New Jersey. She was on a voyage from Port of Spain, Trinidad to New York.
Excel	United Kingdom	The ketch capsized in Totland Bay with the loss of a crew member.
Feodore	(Dominion of Newfoundland) Newfoundland Colony	The brigantine was abandoned at sea. Her crew were rescued by the steamship Lincoln City (Flag unknown).
Frank M. Fisher	United Kingdom	The schooner was abandoned in the Atlantic Ocean. She was on a voyage from Cardiff to Trinidad.
Glenparis	New South Wales	The ship ran aground at Tuticorin, India. She was on a voyage from Newcastle to Tuticorin. She was refloated.
Helen	United Kingdom	The schooner was driven ashore and wrecked at Tyrello, County Down. Her crew were rescued. She was on a voyage from Garston, Lancashire to Rostrevor, County Down.
Helen	United Kingdom	The schooner was driven ashore at Dundrum, County Down.
Industry	United Kingdom	The dandy ran aground and sank in the River Taff. She was on a voyage from Bridgwater, Somerset to Cardiff.
Lady Wodehouse	United Kingdom	The steamship sank in the River Thames at Greenwich, Kent. She was on a voyage from London to Dublin. She was later refloated.
Kremlin	Flag unknown	The steamship ran aground and was severely damaged. She was on a voyage from Moulmein, Burma to a European port. She was refloated and put in to Rangoon in a severely leaky condition.
Lizzie	United Kingdom	The sloop was driven ashore near Le Touquet, Pas-de-Calais, France.
Lizzie J. Bigelow	United States	The ship was abandoned at sea. She was on a voyage from Saint Martin's to Boston, Massachusetts.
Lune	New South Wales	The ship was wrecked on Cliffy Island, Victoria. She was on a voyage from Newcastle to Batavia, Netherlands East Indies.
Macaulay	United Kingdom	The ship ran aground in the York River. She was on a voyage from West Point, Maine, United States to Liverpool, Lancashire. She was refloated and resumed her voyage.
Maria	Portugal	The brigantine was run down and sunk at Lisbon by a Portuguese steamship. She was on a voyage from Lisbon to Panama City, United States of Colombia.
Mary Coad	United Kingdom	The schooner collided with another vessel and sank off Happisburgh, Norfolk. Her crew survived. She was on a voyage from the Firth of Forth to Poole, Dorset.
Minnie Gray	United States	The ship was abandoned at sea. She was on a voyage from Wilmington, Delaware to London.
Naples	United Kingdom	The steamship caught fire at sea. She was on a voyage from Bangkok, Siam to Bremen, Germany. The fire was extinguished and she put in to Malta.
Nederland en Oranje	Netherlands	The steamship sank at Aden, Aden Settlement. She was on a voyage from Amsterdam, North Holland to Batavia. She was refloated.
Newcomen	United Kingdom	The steamship was driven ashore at Antwerp. She was on a voyage from Victoria to Antwerp. She was later refloated, but then collided with the steamship St. Mathieu (France).
Nifa	United Kingdom	The steamship was driven ashore on Anholt, Denmark. She was on a voyage from Newcastle upon Tyne, Northumberland to Pillau, Germany.
Northumbria	United Kingdom	The brig ran aground on the Maplin Sand, in the North Sea off the coast of Essex. She was refloated on 13 February.
Ocean Traveller	United Kingdom	The barque was driven ashore and wrecked in the Carlingford Lough. Her crew were rescued.
Oxford	United Kingdom	The steamship was driven ashore at "Carlos". She was on a voyage from Hull to Reval, Russia. She was refloated.
Pioneer	United Kingdom	The ship was wrecked in Sinclair Bay with the loss of two of her crew.
Port Royal	United Kingdom	The ship was abandoned in the North Sea. Her crew were rescued by a smack. She was on a voyage from Christiania, Norway to Lowestoft.
Resolut	Norway	The brigantine was wrecked at Penedo, Brazil. Her crew were rescued.
Revello	United Kingdom	The ship was destroyed by fire at Rangoon. She was on a voyage from the Clyde to Rangoon.
Russia	United Kingdom	The ship sprang a leak off Holyhead, Anglesey whilst on a voyage from Liverpool to Rangoon. She put back to Birkenhead, Cheshire, where she collided with the dockside and sank. She was refloated and anchored in the River Mersey.
Skyro	Sweden	The steamship ran aground and sank off Stockholm before 3 February.
St. Mathaus	Germany	The ship ran ashore on Bornholm, Denmark. She was on a voyage from New York, United States to Danzig.
Storjohann	Flag unknown	The ship collided with the steamship Para (United Kingdom) off Buenos Aires, Argentina and was severely damaged. She was towed in to Buenos Aires in a sinking condition.
Ternen	Norway	The brig was abandoned off Porto, Portugal. Her crew were rescued by a tug. She was subsequently towed in to Porto.
Thetford	United Kingdom	The steamship ran aground at Blyth, Northumberland.
Tilly	Germany	The brig was wrecked at Angra Pequena, German South West Africa. Her crew were rescued.
Vénétienne	France	The ship collided with the steamship Echo (Netherlands) and was severely damaged. Vénétienne was on a voyage from Rouen, Seine-Inférieure to Plymouth, Devon, United Kingdom. She put in to Havre de Grâce, Seine-Inférieure.
Wandle	United Kingdom	The steamship ran aground at Gibraltar.
William and Sarah	United Kingdom	The ship was driven ashore near Carrickfergus Castle, County Antrim and was severely damaged.
