= Liu Bingzhang =

- 刘秉璋
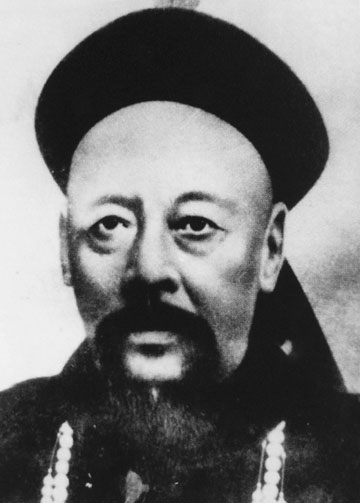
- Monarch: Guangxu Emperor

Governor of Jiangxi
- In office 1875–1878

Governor of Zhejiang
- In office 1882–1886

Viceroy of Sichuan
- In office 1886–1895

Personal details
- Born: May 20, 1826 Lujiang County, Anhui
- Died: August 23, 1905 (aged 79) Wuwei County
- Citizenship: Qing Empire
- Children: Liu Tiqian (刘体乾); Liu Tiren (刘体仁); Liu Tixin (刘体信); Liu Tizhi (刘体智)
- Education: Jinshi degree in the Imperial Examination

Liu Bingzhang (Chinese: 刘秉璋; Wade–Giles: Liu Ping-chang; May 20, 1826 – August 23, 1905) was a Qing dynasty Chinese scholar-official and general. He served as Governor of Jiangxi and Zhejiang provinces and Viceroy of Sichuan. He was a commander in the civil war against the Taiping Rebellion and Nian Rebellion, and the Battle of Zhenhai during the Sino-French War.

== Early life ==
Liu passed the imperial civil service examination (keju) in 1860 and obtained jinshi, the highest degree.

== Career ==
After obtaining his degree, Liu Bingzhang began his career at the prestigious Hanlin Academy, but was soon sent to the battlefields to help stamp out the Taiping Rebellion. After that, he helped quash the Nian Rebellion. In 1875, he was appointed Governor (xunfu) of Jiangxi Province, but resigned in 1878 in order to return home and fulfill his filial duty for his elderly mother. In 1882, he was appointed Governor of Zhejiang Province, and was responsible for the defense of the Zhejiang coast. In this capacity, he fought in the Battle of Zhenhai against the French fleet. To commemorate the victory, the Chinese government built the Zhenhai Coastal Defense History Museum in Zhenhai, Ningbo in 1997.

He was awarded the position of Viceroy of Sichuan in 1886, and dealt with anti-missionary riots in Sichuan. The Christian missionaries complained that he was not effectively punishing the rioters, and under the pressure of Britain, the Qing court stripped Liu of his position in 1895. He died in 1905.

== Legacy ==
To commemorate the Battle of Zhenhai, the Chinese government built the Zhenhai Coastal Defense History Museum in Zhenhai, Ningbo in 1997. In 2011, a memorial park was opened in his hometown Wanshan (万山镇), Lujiang County, Anhui Province, to honor his 185th birthday.
