= 镇海区 =

镇海区; 鎭海區, meaning "district in the sea of the town", may refer to:

- Jinhae-gu, district in Changwon City, South Korea
- Zhenhai District, district in Ningbo, Zhejiang Province, China
