= Battle of Zhenhai =

Coordinates: 29°58′N 121°43′E

- Part of the Sino-French War
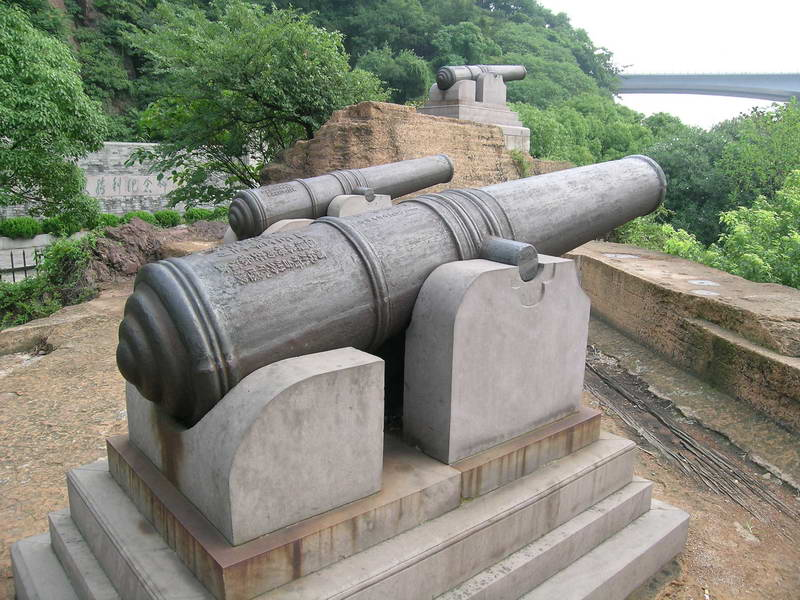
- Cannons at the monument of Zhenhai
Date	1 March 1885
Location	Zhenhai, Zhejiang, China
Result	Chinese victory

Belligerents
France	(Qing dynasty) China

Commanders and leaders
Amédée Courbet	(Qing dynasty) Ouyang Lijian (Qing dynasty) Xue Fucheng (Qing dynasty) Liu Bingzhang (Qing dynasty) Wu Ankang

Strength
2 ironclads, 1 cruiser, 1 troopship	3 cruisers, 1 sloop, 1 transport, 2 gunboats and shore batteries

Casualties and losses
single-digit casualties	26 killed 30 injured

The Battle of Zhenhai (Chinese: 鎮海之役) was a minor confrontation that took place on 1 March 1885 between Admiral Amédée Courbet's Far East Squadron (escadre de l'extrême-Orient) and Chinese warships and shore batteries near the coastal city of Zhenhai, 12 miles (19 km) downstream from Ningbo, China during the Sino-French War (August 1884 – April 1885). French and Chinese sources disagree sharply as to what happened; French sources treat the encounter as a minor incident, while Chinese sources consider it a striking defensive victory. The Battle of Zhenhai is still commemorated in China as an important Chinese victory in the Sino-French War.

== Background ==
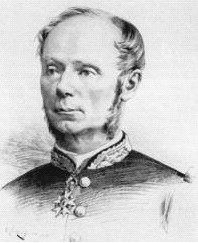
Admiral Anatole-Amédée-Prosper Courbet (1827-85)

In early February 1885 part of Admiral Amédée Courbet's Far East Squadron left Keelung to head off a threatened attempt by part of the Chinese Nanyang Fleet (Southern Seas fleet) to break the French blockade of Formosa (Taiwan). On 11 February Courbet's task force met the cruisers Kaiji (開濟), Nanchen (南琛) and Nanrui (南瑞), three of the most modern ships in the Chinese fleet, near Shipu Bay, accompanied by the frigate Yuyuen (馭遠) and the composite sloop Chengqing (澄慶). The Chinese flotilla, under the command of Admiral Wu Ankang (吳安康), scattered as the French approached, and while the three cruisers successfully escaped, the French succeeded in trapping Yuyuen and Chengqing in Shipu Bay. On the night of 14 February, during the Battle of Shipu, a French torpedo attack crippled both ships: a French spar torpedo hit Yuyuen while shells from her guns struck Chengqing

On 25 February 1885 Admiral Courbet received instructions to implement a 'rice blockade' to prevent transport of the commodity from Shanghai to northern China. On 28 February he arrived off Zhenhai Bay, en route for Shanghai, with the ironclads Bayard and Triomphante, the unprotected cruiser Nielly and the troopship Saône. Suspecting that Kaiji, Nanchen and Nanrui had taken refuge in Zhenhai Bay, Courbet scouted the entrance to the bay at dawn on 1 March. Not only could he see the masts of the three Chinese cruisers, but was also able to identify four other Chinese warships: the composite sloop Chaowu (超武), the wooden transport Yuankai (元凱) as well as two alphabetical gunboats. The entrance to the bay had been blocked by a barrage of junks sunk by the Chinese authorities while two recently built forts defended the approach.

== The 'Battle of Zhenhai', 1 March 1885 ==
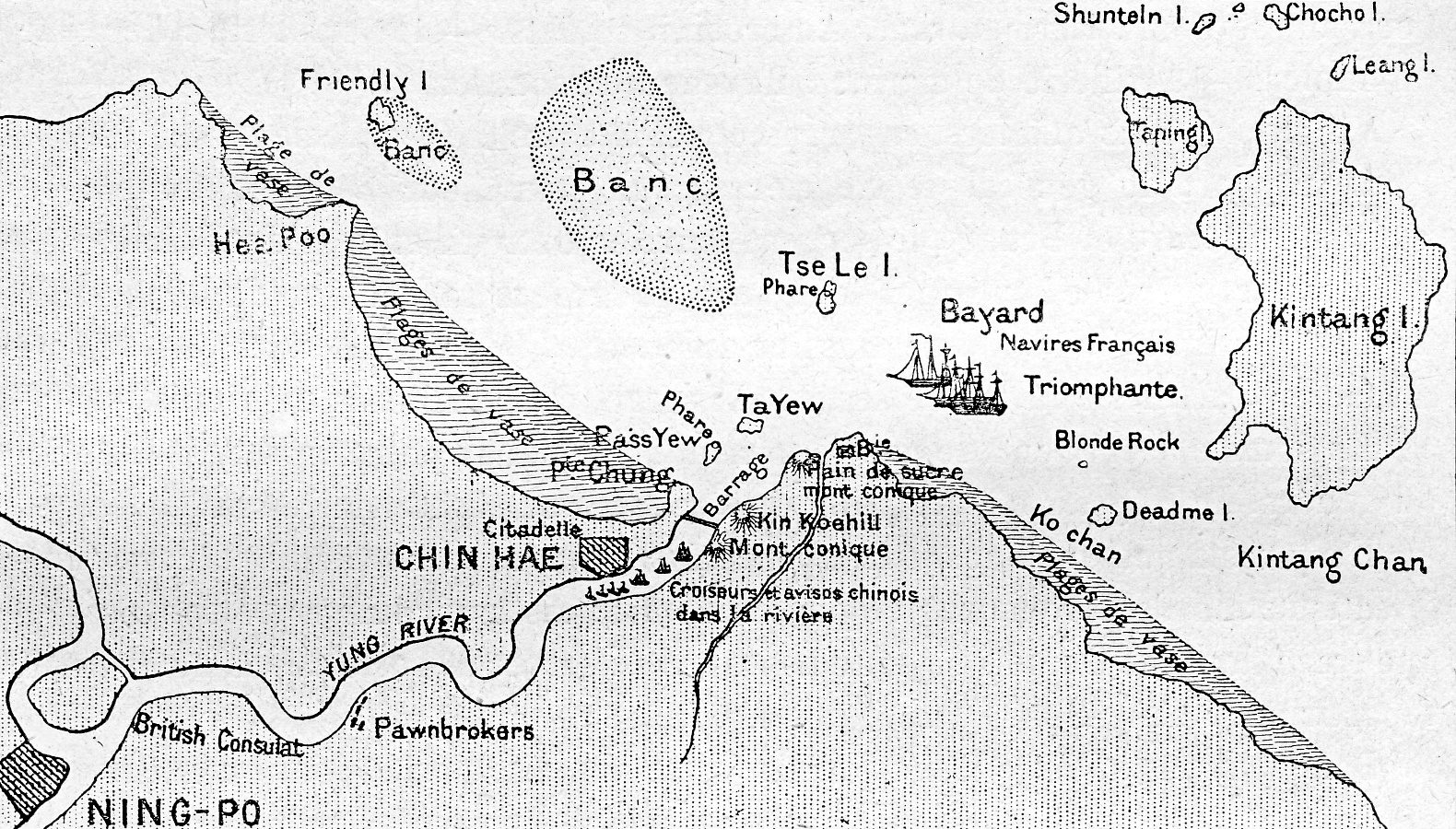
French map of the battle of Zhenhai

Early in the afternoon of 1 March, Courbet conducted closer reconnaissance from the Nielly, triggering vigorous fire from Chinese shore batteries and nearby warships. Despite the extreme long range, some of their shots landed within a 100 metres (330 ft) of the French cruiser. Unharmed, Nielly returned fire and slowly rejoined the squadron. The duel lasted a little over half an hour, and it is questionable whether Nielly's fire was any more effective than that of the Chinese. Nevertheless, the French claimed to have killed a number of soldiers ashore and inflicted slight damage on one of the shore batteries.

On the evening of 1 March, Courbet gave orders for an attack the next day, but on the morning of the planned assault the risks of the operation became evident. Silencing the Chinese batteries would be a long and slow business, and while the French ironclads duelled with the forts they would be exposed to fire from the three Chinese cruisers. Even if the French warships succeeded in suppressing the Chinese defences and forcing the barrage, the enemy cruisers might still elude them by heading upriver towards Ningbo. Courbet decided not to incur unnecessary casualties, and cancelled the planned attack.

== The French blockade of Zhenhai, March–June 1885 ==
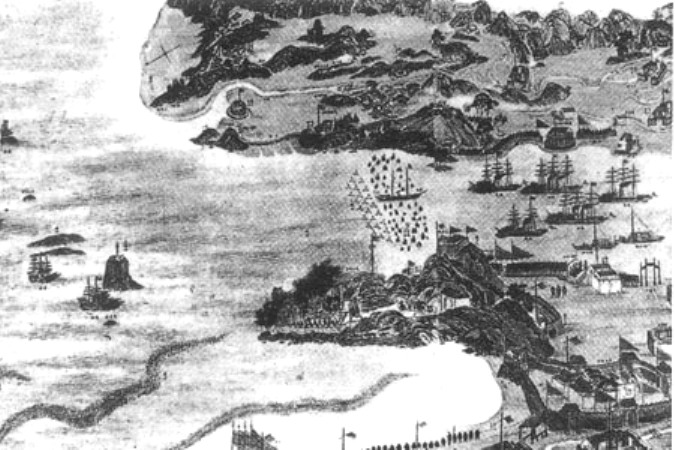
The battle of Zhenhai (Chinese print)

The French ships rested on 2 March, then on the following day Courbet had soundings taken at various points around the entrance to the bay, in a vain search for a position from which the French ironclads would be in range of the Chinese cruisers with their guns without coming under fire from the Chinese forts. There were no such positions, and Courbet eventually issued orders for a blockade of Zhenhai Bay. Nets were spread around the French ships as a precaution against a possible Chinese torpedo attack while a watch was kept around the clock on the entrance to the bay. Any junks or sampans that came too close to the French ships were fired on.

These precautions proved unnecessary. Instead of making plans for an attack on the French squadron, the Chinese commanders appear to have feared a French torpedo boat sally up the Ningpo River to repeat their recent triumph at the Battle of Shipu. On the night of 2 March, as the French squadron lay at anchor, a searchlight suddenly swept the Chinese barrage, several flares soared into the air, and the sound of cannon and rifle fire came from within the bay. Nervous Chinese sentries had mistakenly identified a harmless fishing boat as a French torpedo boat and immediately given the alarm. The French listened in disbelief as the Chinese blazed away until dawn at an imaginary enemy.

This state of affairs continued, on an almost nightly basis, for the rest of the month. At least two French ships from the Far East Squadron remained at anchor at the entrance to Zhenhai Bay throughout March. Apparently unable or unwilling to attack the French warships, the Chinese instead treated them to an expensive firework display, either because Chinese commanders feared a night torpedo attack or as an attempt to boost the morale of their troops. One or two of the more professionally minded French officers complained at the prodigious waste of ammunition sanctioned by the enemy generals, but most enjoyed the nocturnal display of flashes and detonations above Zhenhai Bay as a welcome respite from the tedium of blockade service. The only significant incident during the blockade was a brief cannonade by the French ships towards the end of March, to prevent the Chinese from attempting to repair their damaged forts.

== Official Chinese account ==
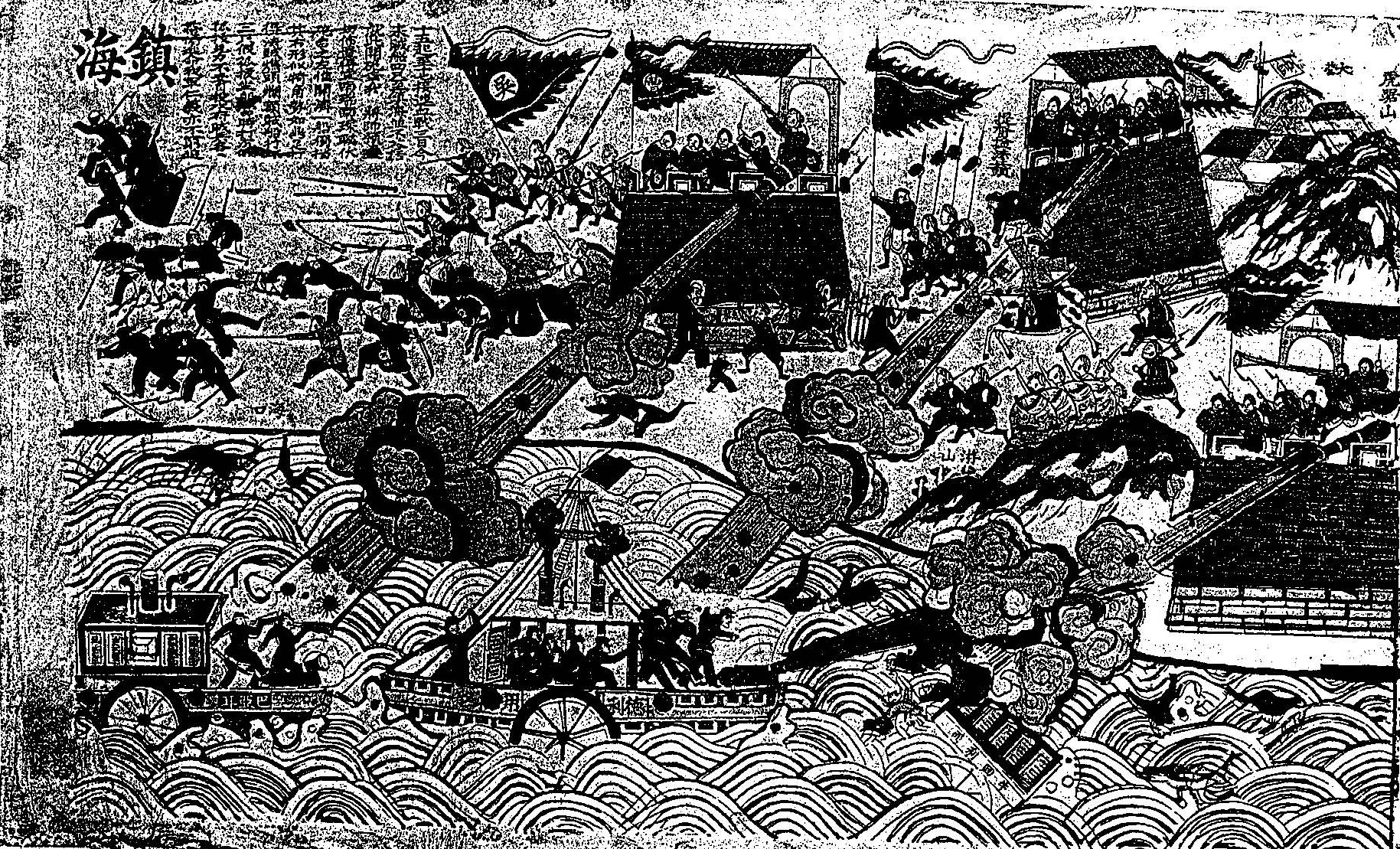
Bayard, Triomphante and Nielly under fire from Chinese shore batteries at Zhenhai

As far as the French were concerned, they had bottled up seven Chinese warships in Zhenhai Bay, where they remained immobilised for the rest of the war. Although Courbet had not gone in after them, locating and trapping the Chinese warships ranked as a strategic success comparable to the destruction of Yuyuan and Chengqing a fortnight earlier. But that was not how the Chinese saw things. Courbet's decision not to force the defences of Zhenhai Bay allowed the Chinese to claim the brief engagement on 1 March as a striking defensive victory. The half-hour exchange of shots between Nielly and the Chinese shore batteries became a six-hour battle in which Courbet's ships suffered rough treatment and the French commander received serious wounds, while the brief engagement on 1 March became a three-day battle from 1 to 3 March, during which the French repeatedly attacked and were repulsed.

The Chinese account of hostilities crystallised shortly after the war, with the 1889 erection of a commemorative tablet near the site of the engagement by the Chinese general Ouyang Lijian (歐陽利見), who had been charged with the defence of Ningbo and Zhenhai. According to Ouyang's account, the defence of the town was in the hands of the Chinese military mandarins Xue Fucheng (薛福成), Liu Bingzhang and himself. The artillery officer Wu Jie (吳杰) became the hero of the battle for directing the fire of a battery of cannon. Wu Jie defied direct orders not to fire on the French, and precipitated the battle by ordering his men to open fire. The Chinese cannon inflicted terrible damage on the French ships, hitting both Bayard and Nielly, and a shot aimed in person by Wu Jie severely wounded the 'terrible Guba' (as the Chinese called Courbet). With the battle over, Wu Jie expected to be commended for his prowess but instead he was punished for disobedience.

== Arlington's account ==
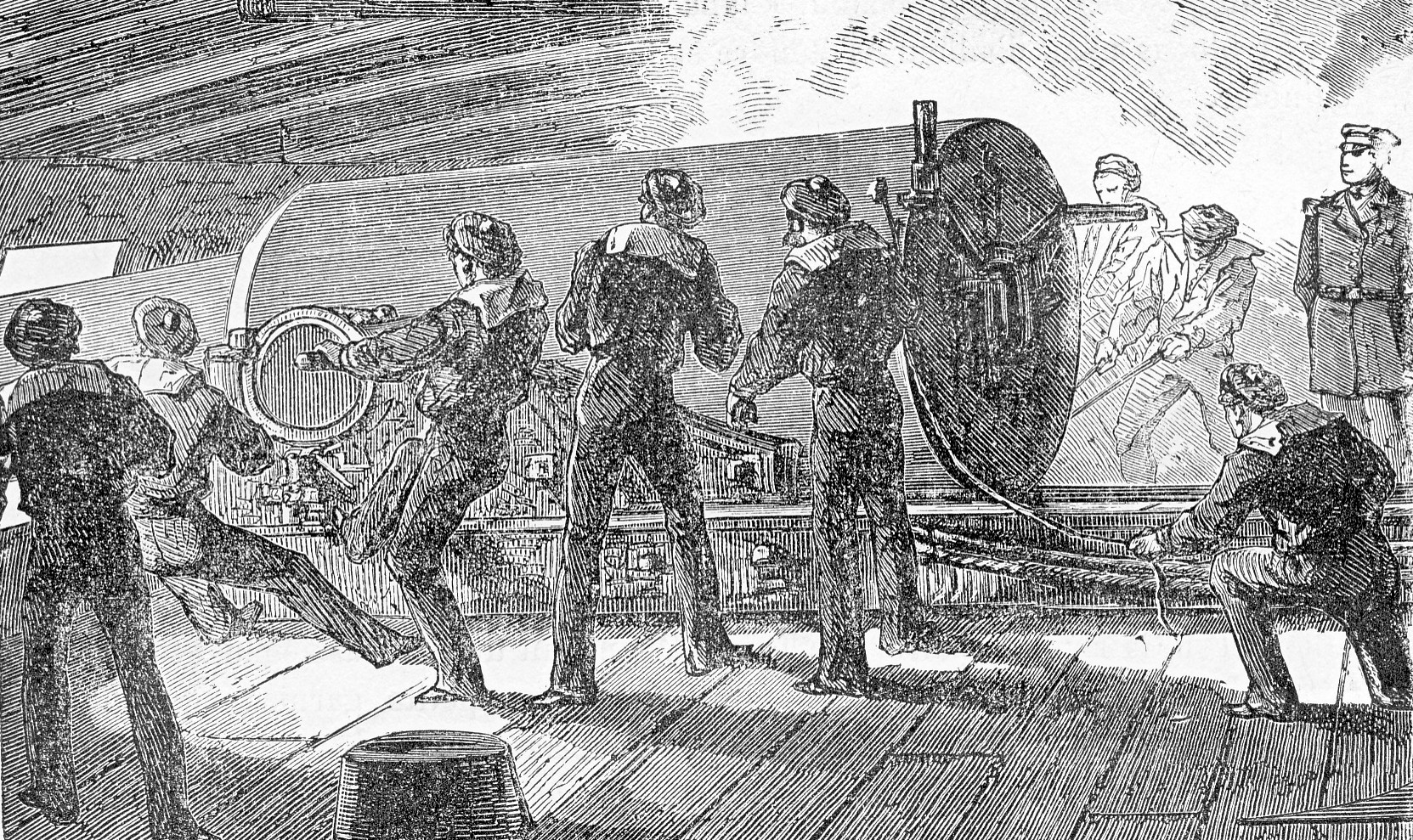
Nielly's guns in action at Zhenhai, 1 March 1885

L. C. Arlington, an American naval officer serving as a 'foreign adviser' with the Nanyang Fleet at Zhenhai, provides testimony that sheds light on Ouyang Lijian's patriotic account. According to the American, the Zhenhai authorities remained extremely reluctant to allow Admiral Wu Ankang's three cruisers to take refuge in Zhenhai Bay. Fearful of provoking a French attack, they begged him to go elsewhere whereupon Admiral Wu threatened to take his ships upriver to Ningbo and leave them to deal with the French squadron on their own. When the French appeared off Zhenhai on 28 February, the land authorities urged Wu to sail out and attack the French with the seven ships at his disposal. Wu, wisely in Arlington's opinion, refused to do so. None of the Chinese or foreign naval officers believed that Wu's ships could win such a battle.

According to Arlington, Chinese gunners were reluctant to fire on the French on 1 March. He reports that a German gunner named Jerkins precipitated the artillery duel by opening fire on one of the French ships without orders. A shot from Admiral Courbet's flagship, the ironclad Nielly (incorrectly identified as her sister ship Atalante by Arlington), hit the artillery battery that had opened fire, killing 26 Chinese soldiers and wounding 30 more. The engagement developed and spread, eventually drawing in all the Chinese shore batteries and Chinese warships.

Arlington also mentions a second engagement on 3 March, in which a French warship was damaged. This engagement is not mentioned in any French source.

== Aftermath ==
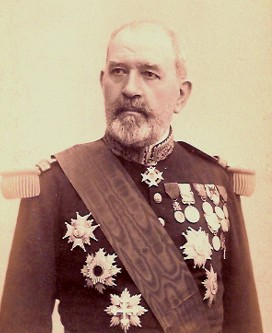
Admiral Adrien-Barthélémy-Louis Rieunier (1833–1918)

France and China signed preliminary peace accords on 4 April 1885, but the French maintained their blockades of Zhenhai and the Yangzi River until a substantive peace treaty ending the Sino-French War (the Treaty of Tientsin) was signed on 9 June. On 11 June 1885 Admiral Courbet died of dysentery aboard his flagship Bayard in Makung harbour, where most of the Far East Squadron had been stationed since the end of the Pescadores Campaign in late March 1885. On 13 June Admiral Adrien-Barthélémy-Louis Rieunier, then stationed off Shanghai with the ironclad Turenne, officially notified the Chinese authorities at Shanghai of Courbet's death. He also sent word to military commissioner Ouyang Lijian at Zhenhai. As France and China were now at peace, the Chinese lowered their flags to half-mast from the Zhenhai shore batteries, in accordance with international protocol. Only three months earlier, these same batteries had done their best to kill the French admiral.

Admiral Rieunier later heard that the French might have captured all seven Chinese ships without loss had they attacked the Zhenhai defences on 2 March 1885. Shortly after the end of the war, the British consul at Ningbo told Rieunier that Courbet's arrival had created such alarm that the Chinese ship captains were ready to surrender if the French made a serious attack on the defences of Zhenhai. With the British keen to preserve their neutrality, the consul had punctiliously refrained from conveying this valuable information to the French.

== French ships at Zhenhai ==
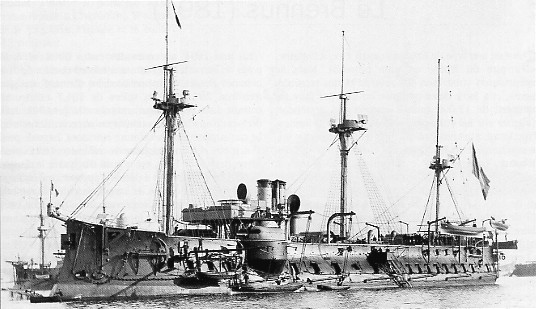
Bayard (5,915 tons), Admiral Courbet's flagship

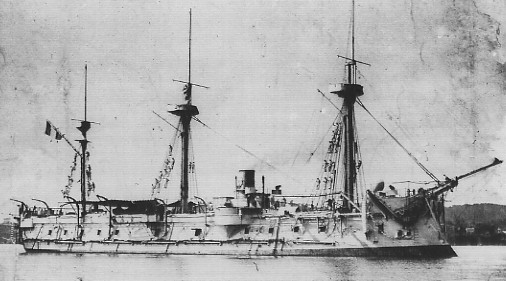
Triomphante (4,585 tons)

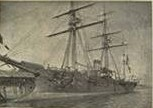
Nielly

== Chinese ships at Zhenhai ==
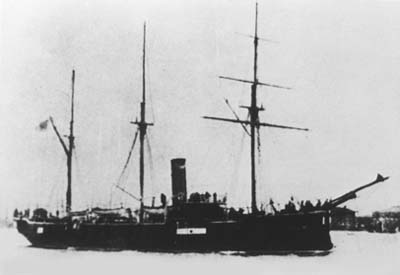
Kaiji (開濟)

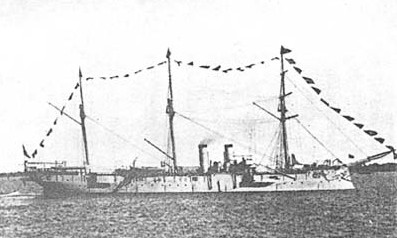
Nanchen (南琛)

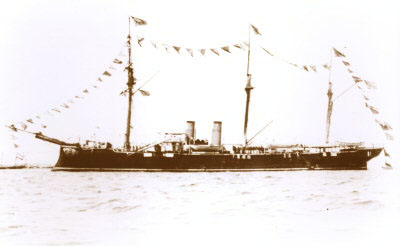
Nanrui (南瑞)

== Commemoration of the battle of Zhenhai in China ==
The 'battle of Zhenhai' is still remembered with pride in China. Chinese fortifications and cannon used during the battle are preserved at Zhenhai alongside a monument that bears the inscription 中法战争镇海之役胜利纪念碑, 'Monument to the victory in the Zhenhai battle in the Sino-French War'.

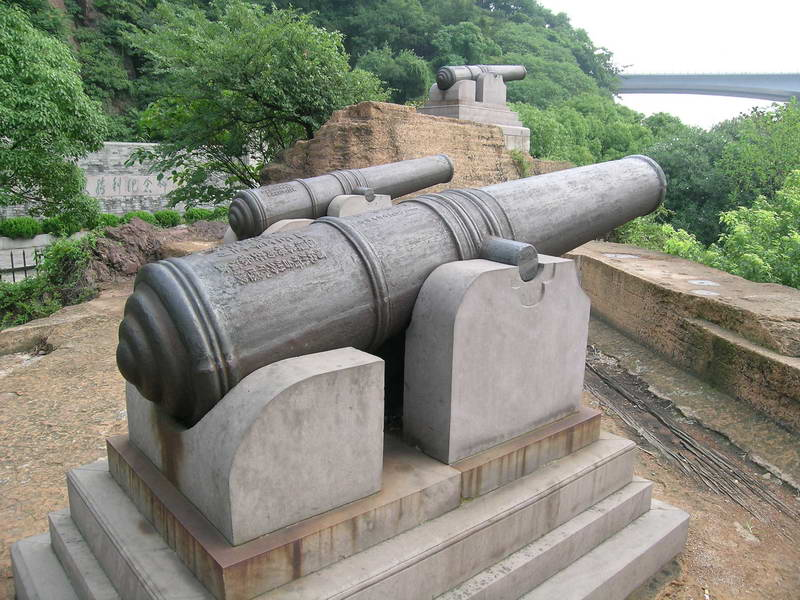
Chinese cannon at Zhenhai

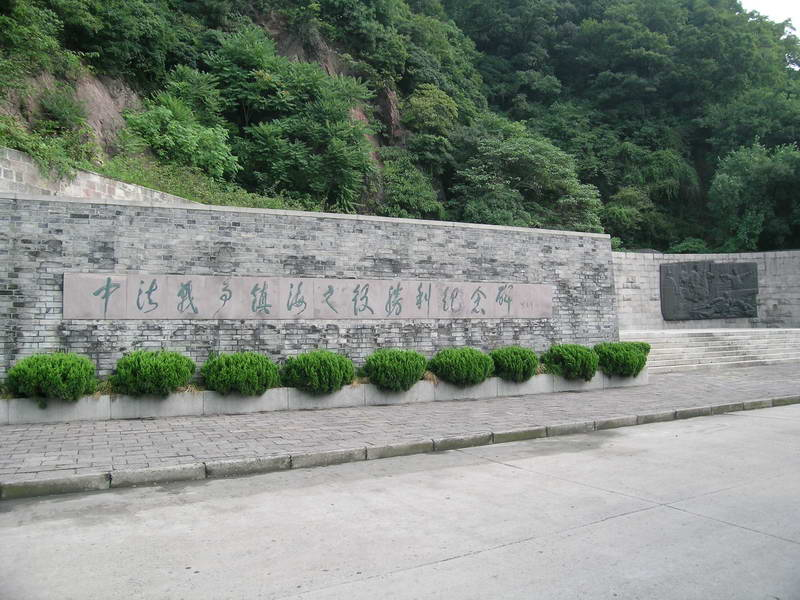
Chinese victory monument, Zhenhai

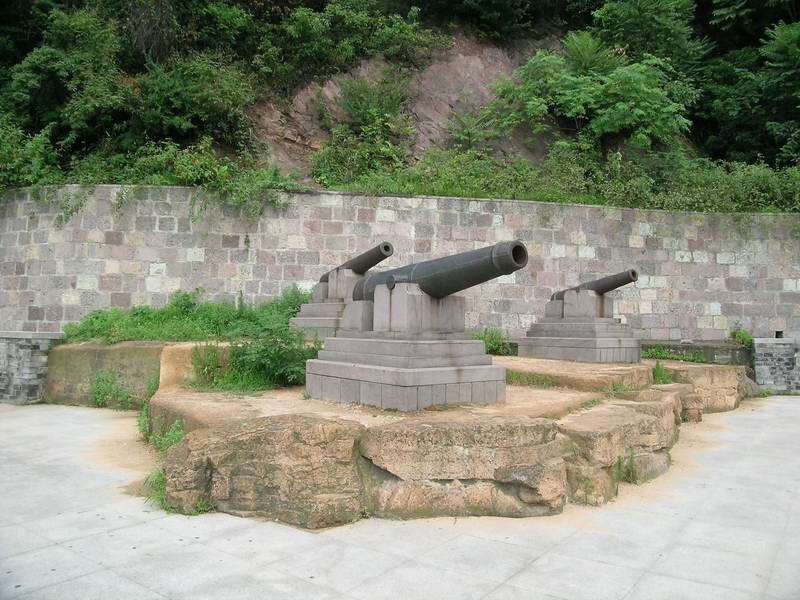
Chinese cannon at Zhenhai

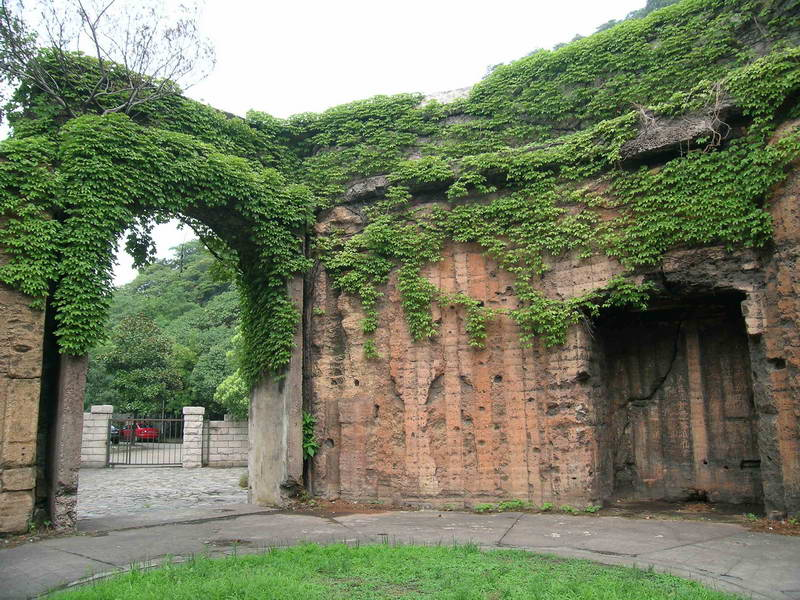
Fortifications at Zhenhai
