= Nan Chen =

Nan Chen or Nanchen may refer to:

- Chen Nan (born 1983), Chinese basketball player
- Chinese cruiser Nan Thin (1883–1902), Chinese cruiser of the Imperial Chinese Navy
- Chen dynasty (557–589), sometimes known as Nan Chen or Southern Chen dynasty
- Nanchen Township (南辰乡), a township in Donghai County, Jiangsu, China

== See also ==
- Nangqên County or Nangchen County, Tibet
