= Zhaobao Mountain =

Mountain in Zhejiang, China

- 招寶山
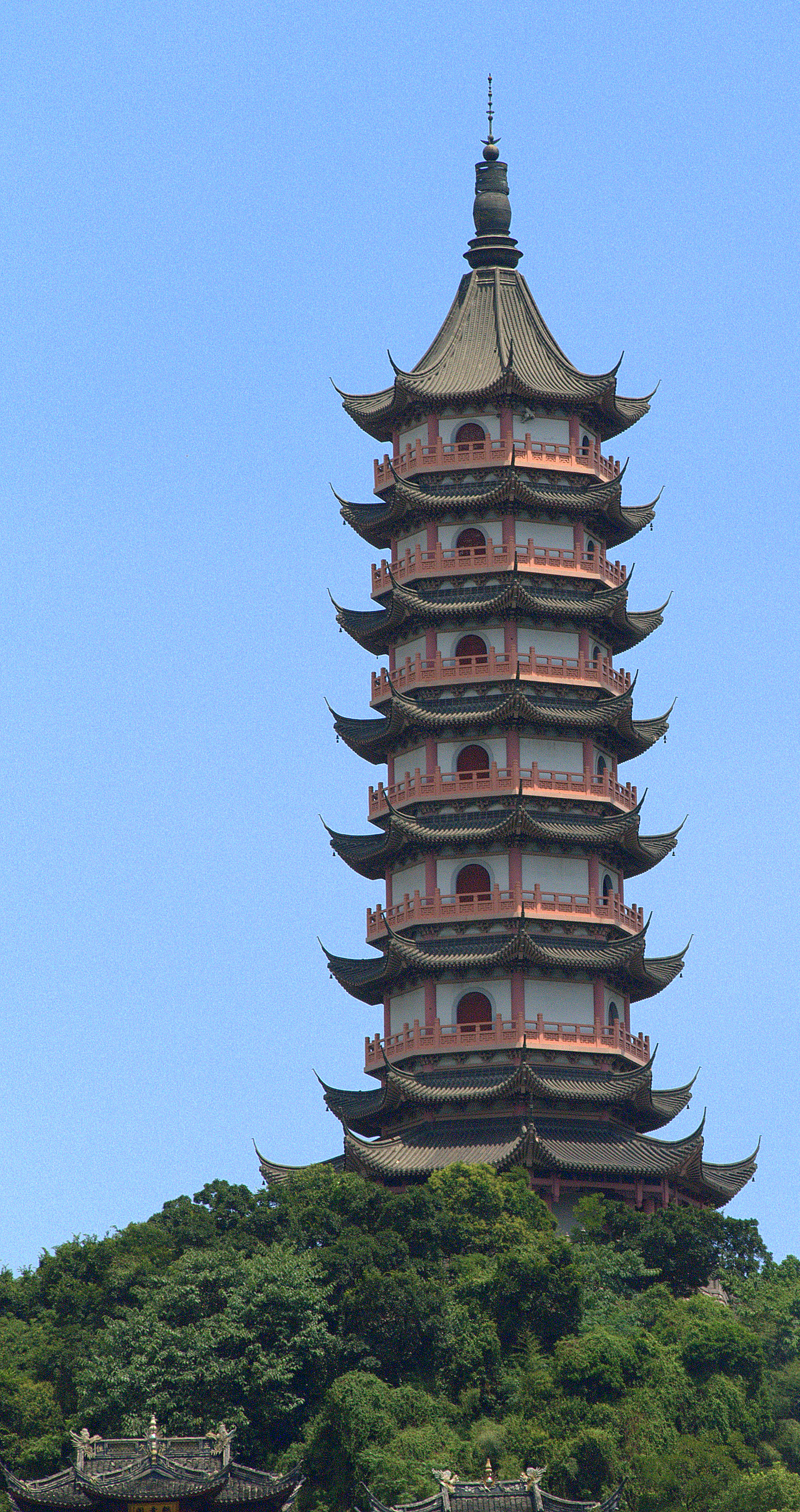

- Location within China
- Coordinates: 29°57′37″N 121°42′31″E

Zhaobao Mountain (simplified Chinese: 招宝山; traditional Chinese: 招寶山; pinyin: Zhāobǎo Shān; Wu: Cio-Pau Sae) also known as Zhaobao Mount or Zhaobao Hill. Located on the north bank near the mouth of the Yong River at the east end of the town of Zhenhai 12 miles (19 km) northeast of the city of Ningbo.

== Description ==
The Zhaobao Mount Scenic Area includes walking trails on and around the hill with numerous sites to explore during a visit. These include the 57.6-metre-tall (189 ft) seven-story Aozhu Pagoda, the 2,000-foot-long (610 m) 10-foot-thick (3.0 m) Weiyuan City Wall built during the Ming dynasty, and the even older Zhenhai Seawall originally built in 897 CE during the Tang dynasty. Sanskrit rock carvings, including a Buddhist prayer chant, are one of the oldest features of the hill. The Tianhou Temple is dedicated to the Heavenly Empress (see also Mazu) and the Guanyin Pavilion is dedicated to the Goddess of Mercy (see also Guan Yin). The mountain is named after the sea god Zhāobǎo Qīláng, a forerunner of the more recent sea deity Qianliyan, a subordinate of the goddess Mazu.

At the foot of the hill is the Zhenhai Coastal Defense Museum. Exhibits include the war against Japanese pirates during the Ming dynasty, the Battle of Zhenhai in 1885 (see also Sino-French War), and the modern Chinese navy.

== Transport ==
The scenic area can be accessed by bus 541 from Ningbo city. The ride takes approximately 50 minutes.

== Entry ==
Standard tickets are 60 yuan per person ($8.44 USD).

== History ==
The area was briefly occupied by British forces in 1842 and ended with ratification of the Treaty of Nanking.
