= Ye Chengzhong =

Chinese businessman and philanthropist

- 葉澄衷
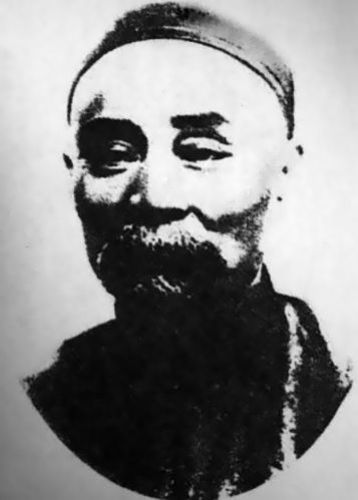
- Ye Chengzhong
- Born: 1840
- Died: 1899 (aged 58–59)

Ye Chengzhong
- Traditional Chinese: 葉澄衷
- Simplified Chinese: 叶澄衷
Transcriptions
Standard Mandarin
- Hanyu Pinyin: Yè Chéngzhōng
- Wade–Giles: Yeh Ch'eng-chung

Ye Chengzhong (Chinese: 葉澄衷; Wade–Giles: Yeh Ch'eng-chung; 1840–1899) was a Chinese businessman and philanthropist active during the final years of the Qing Dynasty and a pioneer in the hardware industry who also made considerable contributions to education.

== Biography ==
Born in the Zhenhai District of Ningbo in Zhejiang Province and originally called Cheng Zhong (成忠), Ye's father died when he was young leaving the family poverty stricken. At the age of 14 he left school and begin work as an apprentice in a grocery store in Shanghai. He saved enough money to buy a sampan from which he then sold food to foreign sailors on the Huangpu River. According to The Century-Old Famous Factories and Stores in Shanghai published in 1987, an American businessman hired Ye's boat for a ride in 1862 but left behind a briefcase full of cash and valuables. Ye waited patiently and when the man returned he was deeply impressed by the boatman's honesty. He then lent Ye the money to open his first hardware store on Daming Road in the Hongkou District of Shanghai. In 1890 Ye opened the Xiechang Match Factory (燮昌火柴厂) in Shanghai then in 1897 added branch mills at Hankou in modern-day Wuhan and Suzhou. Ye expanded into other areas, establishing the Lunhua Silk Mill in 1894 and investing in five native banks (钱庄业 qianzhuang) and one western bank while his real estate company owned more than 400 mu (65.88 acres (26.66 ha)) of property in Shanghai's Hongkou district.

Standard Oil Trust appointed Ye as their exclusive distribution agent in China from 1883 to 1893. As a "comprador-merchant", he organized the distribution of kerosene fuel across North China and the Lower and Middle Yangtze regions.

Ye established the Chengzhong Middle School in Shanghai, which was built between 1889 and 1901 where Cai Yuanpei was the first principal and Hu Shih along with Chu Coching two of the first pupils. Today the building is home to the Shanghai Middle School No. 58. He also gave money to several other charitable institutions.

By the time of his death in October 1899, Ye's assets were valued at between six and eight million taels of silver, equivalent to one-tenth of the Qing government's annual income.

Ye's former residence is now open to the public as a tourist attraction.

== Offspring ==
Sons:

- Ye Yiquan (叶贻铨/葉貽銓)
- Ye Yizhao (叶贻钊/葉貽釗
- Ye Yiyao (叶贻尧/葉貽堯)
