= Nanyang Fleet =

One of four modernised naval fleets in the late Qing dynasty

- Ensign of Nanyang Fleet
- Active: 1870s–1909
- Country: Qing Dynasty
- Allegiance: Emperor of China
- Branch: Imperial Chinese Navy
- Type: Navy
- Garrison/HQ: Shanghai
- Engagements: Sino-French War; First Sino-Japanese War

The Nanyang Fleet (Chinese: 南洋水師) was one of the four modernised Chinese naval fleets in the late Qing Dynasty. Established in the 1870s, the fleet suffered losses in the Sino-French War, escaped intact in the Sino-Japanese War, and was formally abolished in 1909.

== Composition ==
Before 1885, the Southern Seas Fleet (Nanyang Fleet) based at Shanghai, was the largest of China's four regional fleets. In the early 1880s, its best ships were the modern composite cruiser Kaiji, completed in 1884 at the Foochow Navy Yard, the composite sloops Kangji and Chengching, also recent products of the Foochow Navy Yard (1878 and 1880), and the 2,630-ton wooden steam frigate Yuyuan, built at the Kiangnan Arsenal in 1873. The fleet was originally to have had the four steel Rendel gunboats, Zhendong, Zhenxi, Zhennan and Zhenbei, completed in 1879, but Li Hongzhang was so impressed by them that he took them over for the Beiyang Fleet, compensating the Nanyang Fleet with Longxiang, Huwei, Feiting and Cedian, four iron Rendel 'alphabetical' gunboats that had been in service at Tianjin since 1876.

The fleet also included the elderly wooden gunboats Caojiang, Zehai, Weijing and Jingyuan, the first three products of the Kiangnan Arsenal (1869 and 1870) and the fourth built at the Foochow Navy Yard in 1872. Other vessels with the fleet or operating on the Yangzi River in 1884 included the composite sloops Chaowu and Chengqing, both built at the Foochow Navy Yard (1878 and 1880); the 2,630-ton wooden steam frigate Haian, built at the Kiangnan Arsenal in 1872; the wooden transports Yuankai and Dengyingzhou, both built at the Foochow Navy Yard (1875 and 1876); and the tiny ironclad Jinou, an experimental product of the Kiangnan Arsenal (1876) nicknamed derisively by Europeans 'the terror of the Western world'.

In July 1884, on the eve of the Sino-French War, the Nanyang fleet was reinforced by the German-built steel cruisers Nanrui and Nanchen, which sailed from Germany in March 1884.

Table 1: Composition of the Nanyang fleet, August 1884

Name (pinyin)	Name (Wade Giles)	Characters	Description	Construction	Specifications
Caojiang	Ts'ao-chiang	操江	wooden gunboat	1869, Kiangnan Dockyard	640 tons, 9 knots, four 16-cm Vavasseur guns
Zehai	Ts'e-hai	測海	wooden gunboat	1869, Kiangnan Dockyard	600 tons, 12 knots, fifteen 12-cm guns
Weijing	Wei-ching	威靖	wooden gunboat	1870, Kiangnan Dockyard	1,000 tons, 12 knots
Haian	Hai-an	海安	wooden steam frigate	1872, Kiangnan Dockyard	2,800 tons, 12 knots, two 21-cm, four 15-cm and two 12-cm Krupp cannon
Jingyuan	Ching-yuan	靖遠	wooden gunboat	1872, Foochow Navy Yard	572.5 tons, 8 knots, two 16-cm Vavasseur and two 40-lb guns
Yuyuan	Yu-yuen	馭遠	wooden steam frigate	1873, Kiangnan Dockyard	2,800 tons, 14 knots, two 21-cm and four 15-cm Krupp cannon, twenty 12-cm guns
Yuankai	Yuan-k'ai	元凱	wooden transport	1875, Foochow Navy Yard	1,250 tons, 10 knots, one 16-cm and four 40-lb guns
Dengyingzhou	Teng-ying-chou	登瀛洲	wooden transport	1876, Foochow Navy Yard	1,258 tons, 10 knots, one 16-cm and four 12-cm guns
Jinou	Chin-ou	金歐	ironclad	1876, Kiangnan Dockyard	No details available
Longxiang	Lung-hsiang	龍驤	iron Rendel gunboat	1876, Mitchell & Co.	319 tons, one 26.5-ton Armstrong gun
Feiting	Fei-t'ing	飛霆	iron Rendel gunboat	1876, Mitchell & Co.	400 tons, 9 knots, one 38-ton Armstrong gun, two 12-lb guns
Cedian	Ts'e-tien	策電	iron Rendel gunboat	1876, Mitchell & Co.	319 tons, one 38.5-ton Armstrong gun, two 12-lb guns
Huwei	Hu-wei	虎威	iron Rendel gunboat	1876, Mitchell & Co.	319 tons, one 26.5-ton Armstrong gun
Chaowu	Ch'ao-wu	超武	composite sloop	1878, Foochow Navy Yard	1,250 tons, 11.5 knots, one 19-cm and four 40-lb guns
Kangji	K'ang-chi	康濟	composite sloop	1879, Foochow Navy Yard	1,200 tons, one 7-in MLR, six 4.7-in MLR
Chengqing	Ch'eng-ch'ing	澄慶	composite sloop	1880, Foochow Navy Yard	1,200 tons, one 7-in MLR, six 4.7-in MLR
Kaiji	K'ai-chi	開濟	composite cruiser	1884, Foochow Navy Yard	2,153 tons, 15 knots, two 21-cm and six 12-cm Krupp cannon, 4 Nordenfeldt guns
Nanchen	Nan-ch'en	南琛	steel cruiser	1884, Howaldt, Kiel	2,200 tons, 15 knots, two 8-in Armstrong guns, eight 12-cm quickfirers
Nanrui	Nan-jui	南瑞	steel cruiser	1884, Howaldt, Kiel	2,200 tons, 15 knots, two 8-in Armstrong guns, eight 12-cm quickfirers

== The Sino-French War (August 1884–April 1885) ==
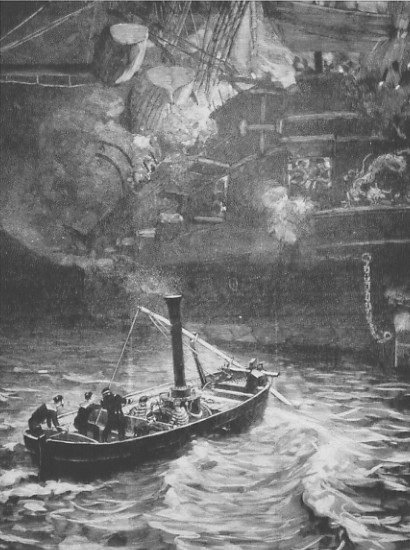
French torpedo launch attacking the Chinese frigate Yuyuan, 14 February 1885

The commander of the Nanyang fleet during the Sino-French War was Admiral Li Chengmou (李成謀), who had earlier commanded the Fujian fleet and the traditional Yangtze water forces.

Most of the ships of the Nanyang fleet remained safely in harbour at Shanghai or Nanking during the Sino-French War (August 1884–April 1885). In July 1884 the French ironclad Triomphante observed the presence of the Nanyang fleet at Shanghai. Her commander, capitaine de vaisseau Baux, cabled Admiral Amédée Courbet for permission to attack the Chinese with Triomphante and the cruiser d'Estaing. Jules Ferry's cabinet considered the merits of an attack on the Nanyang fleet, but decided that the risks to business confidence were too great, and notified Courbet that no naval action would be permitted at Shanghai. Courbet thereupon ordered Triomphante and d'Estaing to leave Shanghai and join him in the Min River, where he was concentrating his squadron against the Fujian Fleet and the Foochow Navy Yard. The French cruiser Parseval was sent to Shanghai in early August to keep the Nanyang Fleet under observation.

Courbet's attack on the Fujian Fleet on 23 August 1884 at the Battle of Fuzhou plunged France and China into war. The Nanyang Fleet commanders responded by splitting the fleet to protect Shanghai and the Nanking Arsenal, both plausible targets for future French naval descents. The Rendel gunboats Longxiang, Feiting, Cedian and Huwei remained at Shanghai, and the frigate Haian was filled with stones and prepared as a blockship, to be sunk across the entrance to the Huangpu river if the French showed themselves in force. The German-built cruisers Nanrui and Nanchen, together with several other ships of the Nanyang Fleet, withdrew to Nanking. In late August 1884 Admiral Courbet ordered Parseval to leave Shanghai. The lone French cruiser had lain within range of the Nanyang Fleet for a whole week after the outbreak of war, but the Chinese made no attempt to attack her. On the night of 30 August 1884 capitaine de vaisseau Thounens of Parseval ran the gauntlet of the guns of the Wusong forts and escaped without casualties to the open sea. The Nanyang Fleet did nothing whatsoever to hinder his departure.

Part of the Nanyang fleet made a disastrous sortie in February 1885 to try to break the French blockade of Formosa. The frigate Yuyuan and the composite sloop Chengqing were sunk in the Battle of Shipu (14 February 1885), the former by a French torpedo attack and the latter by friendly fire. Kaiji, Nanrui, Nanchen, Chaowu, Yuankai and two 'alphabetical' gunboats were trapped in Zhenhai Bay by the French on 1 March 1885 and ignominiously blockaded there for the rest of the war.

== Postwar Development ==
The loss of Yuyuan and Chengqing in February 1885 eroded the Nanyang Fleet's advantage over the Northern Seas Fleet (Beiyang Fleet). During the following decade the Nanyang fleet gradually lost its primacy, as Li Hongzhang invested heavily in the Beiyang Fleet. By 1894, on the eve of the Sino-Japanese War, the Beiyang Fleet had a comfortable superiority over the Nanyang Fleet both in numbers of ships and quality.

Nevertheless, the Nanyang fleet continued to acquire new ships after the Sino-French War, some of reasonable quality. The first of the new ships was the steel cruiser Baomin, completed at the Kiangnan Arsenal in 1885. The next additions were the composite cruisers Jingqing and Huantai, both products of the Foochow Navy Yard (1886 and 1887).

Table 2: Additions to the Nanyang fleet, 1885–94

Name (pinyin)	Name (Wade Giles)	Characters	Description	Construction	Specifications
Baomin	Pao-min	保民	steel cruiser	1885, Kiangnan Dockyard	1,477 tons, 16 knots, two 200-lb and six 70-lb guns
Jingqing	Ching-ch'ing	靖清	composite cruiser	1886, Foochow Navy Yard	1,477 tons, 15 knots, two 15-cm and five 12-cm Krupp cannon
Huantai	Huan-t'ai	寰泰	composite cruiser	1887, Foochow Navy Yard	1,477 tons, 15 knots, two 15-cm and five 12-cm Krupp cannon

== Ships of the Nanyang Fleet ==
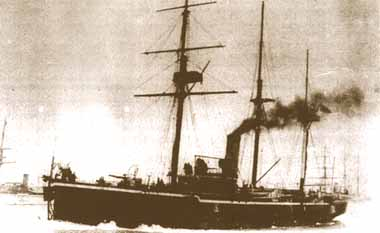
Baomin (保民)

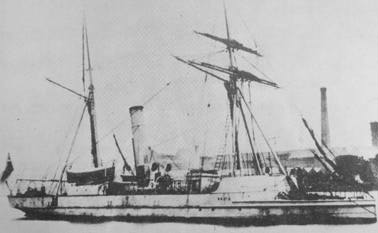
Cedian (策電)

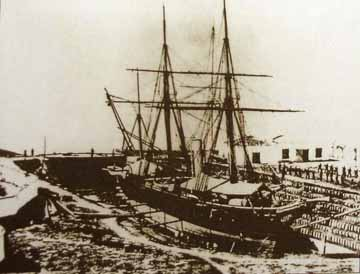
Dengyingzhou (登瀛洲)

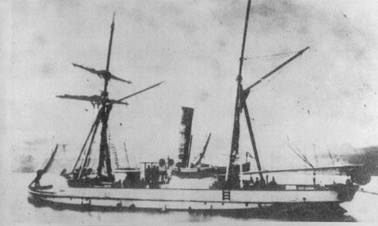
Feiting (飛霆)

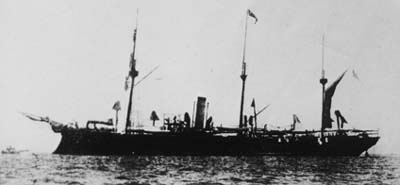
Huantai (寰泰)

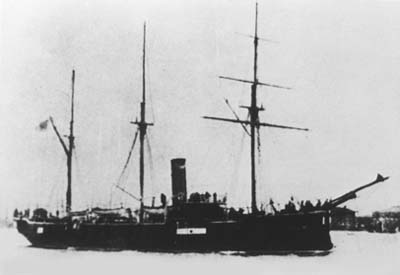
Kaiji (開濟)

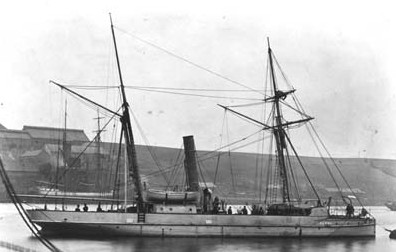
Longxiang (龍驤)

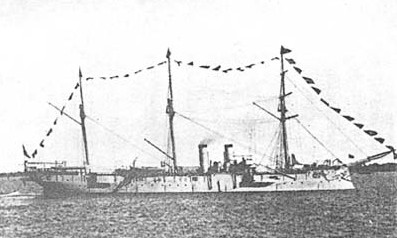
Nanchen (南琛)

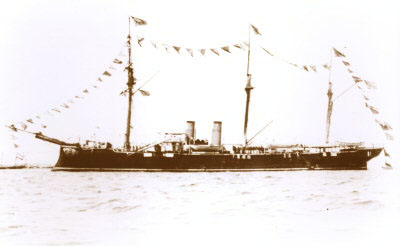
Nanrui (南瑞)
