= Ouyang Lijian =

Chinese admiral (1825–1895)

- 歐陽利見
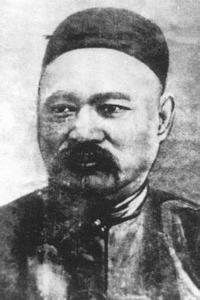
- Born: 1825; Qiyang, Hunan, China
- Died: 1895 (aged 69–70)
- Military career
- Allegiance: China
- Branch: Imperial Chinese Navy
- Service years: 1854–1895
- Rank: Admiral
- Units: Xiang Army; Nian Army
- Commands: Zhejiang Fleet
- Conflicts: Taiping Rebellion: Battle of Changzhou; Sino-French War: Battle of Zhenhai; First Sino-Japanese War

Ouyang Lijian (traditional Chinese: 歐陽利見; simplified Chinese: 欧阳利见; pinyin: Ōuyáng Lìjiàn; 1825–1895), courtesy name Gengtang (賡堂; 赓堂; Gēngtáng), was a Chinese admiral of the Zhejiang Fleet that served Zeng Guofan and Li Hongzhang who was most notable for his participation at the Battle of Zhenhai during the Sino-French War.

== Biography ==
Ouyang was born in 1825 at Qiyang to a poor family and made his early living as a merchant selling tofu and vegetables until applying for Zeng Goufan's recruitment to train sailors while visiting Hengyang.

In 1854, he joined the Changsha Naval Division and moved to Jiangxi and Anhui. In 1863, he followed Li Hongzhang to besiege the Taiping Heavenly Army in Changzhou, and Chen Kunshu, the guardian of the Taiping Heavenly Kingdom, was arrested, and the general army of Huaiyang was nearly terminated. Ouyang also served in the Nian Rebellion and due to his participation, was awarded the Yellow Jacket, and his professional name was Qichebo Batulu. In 1880, he was transferred as Fushan Town's general soldier. In 1881, he was promoted to the Admiral of Zhejiang. During the Sino-French War, he defeated Amédée Courbet at the Battle of Zhenhai. In 1895, he was ordered to assist Liu Kun in Fengtian City due to the First Sino-Japanese War, but died on the way.
