= Chinese cruiser Nan Chen =

Chinese lead ship of Nan-Chen class

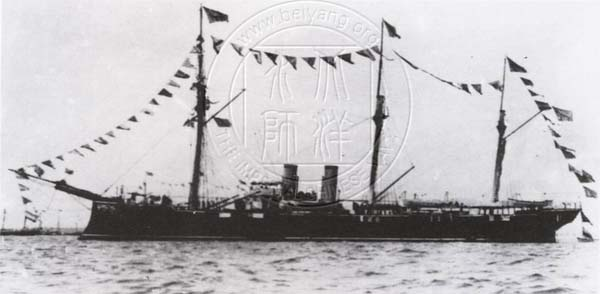
- Exemplar of unprotected cruiser. This is the sister ship, Nan Shui

History

Imperial China
- Name: Nan Chen
- Ordered: Early 1883
- Builder: Howaldtswerke-Deutsche Werft, Kiel, Germany
- Launched: 12 December 1883
- Fate: Stricken 1919

General characteristics
- Type: Nan Chen-class unprotected cruiser
- Displacement: 2,200 long tons (2,200 t)
- Length: 275.5 ft (84.0 m)
- Beam: 37.5 ft (11.4 m)
- Draft: 15 ft (4.6 m)
- Propulsion: Compound-expansion steam engine, two screws; 8 × boilers
- Speed: 15 kn (28 km/h; 17 mph)
- Capacity: 600 tons of coal
- Complement: 250 officers and men
- Armament: 2 × 8.2 in (21 cm) Armstrong guns; 8 × 4.7 in (12 cm) Armstrong guns; Some Hotchkiss guns; Naval ram
- Armor: Cork belt at waterline

Nan Chen (Chinese: 南琛; pinyin: Nán Chēn; Wade–Giles: Nan Ch'en; lit. 'Ornament of the South') was an unprotected cruiser built for the Imperial Chinese Navy. She was built by Howaldtswerke-Deutsche Werft, Kiel, Germany, while her armament was installed by Armstrong Whitworth, Elswick, England. She was the lead ship of the Nan Chen class, alongside her sister vessel Nan Shui, which was based on the design of the cruiser Kai Chi. Nan Chen was considered to be obsolete by the Western Powers even at the time of her construction.

She was active during the Sino-French War of 1884–1885, first as part of a defensive squadron based at Nanking (now Nanjing). Nan Chen then formed part of the cruiser force of the Chinese squadron sent to engage the French blockade of Formosa (now Taiwan) which resulted in the Battle of Shipu. Following the battle, Nan Chen was blockaded into the port of Ningpo (now Ningbo) until the end of the war. She was absorbed into the Chinese navy following the Xinhai Revolution and was stricken in 1919.

== Design and description ==
The Nan Chen-class unprotected cruisers were intended to be of relatively simple design compared to other Imperial Chinese Navy vessels on order from European shipyards at the time. They were similar to the cruiser Kai Chi, but constructed out of steel instead of wood. Both Nan Chen and her sister vessel, Nan Shui, were obsolete during construction; the Chinese navy had also commissioned armored and protected cruisers, such as Zhiyuan.

Nan Chen was 275.5 feet (84.0 metres) long overall. She had a beam of 37.5 ft (11.4 m) and a draft of 15 ft (4.6 m). Zhiyuen displaced 2,200 long tons (2,200 tonnes), and carried a crew of 250 officers and enlisted men. She was unarmored with the exception of a cork belt installed at the waterline of the ship. Unlike Kai Chi, on which the class was based, Nan Chen had two funnels instead of one. Both ships of the class were equipped with a naval ram, and had raised forecastles and poop decks. She was powered by a compound-expansion steam engine with eight boilers, driving a single shaft. This provided 2,400 indicated horsepower (1,800 kW) for a top speed of 15 knots (28 km/h; 17 mph).

Her initial armament consisted of two 8.2 in (21 cm) breach-loading Armstrong guns, alongside eight 4.7-inch (12 cm) breach-loading Armstrong guns and some Hotchkiss guns. The two larger guns were mounted in sponsons ahead of the funnels, while the smaller Armstrongs were placed amidships as a broadside, on the forecastle and poop deck and in further sponsons ahead of the poop. Although the ship was launched in Germany, that armament was added by Armstrong Whitworth while Nan Chen was at its shipyard in Elswick, England. By 1884, she was equipped with a torpedo boat.

== Service history ==
Two cruisers were ordered from Howaldtswerke-Deutsche Werft, Kiel, Germany, in early 1883. At the time of the launch of Nan Chen 12 December 1883, the Germany authorities were preventing some of the Chinese construction from leaving the country such as the Dingyuan-class ironclads due to the impending Sino-French War. However, as she was sailing unarmed, Nan Chen was allowed to travel to England to have her guns installed. The British authorities then considered whether or not to allow the installation to take place, initially embargoing the vessel, but decided to permit it since she was obsolete compared to the French Navy.

The British Government did refuse to allow Nan Chen to test fire her guns, which were not tested until she arrived in China on the Yangtze River in July 1884 just prior to the start of the war. Upon firing, they found that the ship needed to be strengthened to allow the guns to be fired at full charge. Both Nan Chen and her sister were sent to the Kiangnan Arsenal to be reinforced. Despite these issues, and their obsolescence, the German-built cruisers were held in high esteem by the Chinese authorities.

=== Sino-French War ===
After the start of the war in August 1884, Nan Chen and Nan Shui were sent to protect Nanking (now Nanjing) alongside Kai Chi. An attack was thought to be imminent, but the French Navy instead assaulted Formosa (now Taiwan) where they established a blockade. Chinese forces were gathered to drive off the blockade of the island, which comprised the two Nan Chen-class cruisers, Kai Chi, the frigate Yuyuen and the sloop-of-war Teng Ching. The squadron was under the command of Admiral Wu Ang-k'ang. The five ships gathered in Shanghai, leaving in December 1884. They took some time to work up their crews, and did not seek to engage the French immediately, only finally meeting them in the following February.

The Chinese forces attached in a V-shaped formation, being led by Kai Chi as flagship. However, they immediately realised they were outgunned by the French forces and withdrew. While the slower Yuyuen and Teng Ching retreated into Shipu Bay after losing the three cruisers in the fog, which resulted in the Battle of Shipu. Nan Chen, Nan Shui and Kai Chi sailed north to the port of Ningpo (now Ningbo) where they were joined by the sloop-of-war Teng Chao Wu and the transport Yuan-k'ai. All five ships were then blockaded into the port by the French Navy squadron. While some exchanges of fire were conducted in March 1885, this was the last involvement of Nan Chen during the war.

=== Fate ===
During the First Sino-Japanese War, Nan Chen and Nan Shui were sent to the Taiwan strait for patrol duties. On 20 September 1894, Nan Chen captured the U.S. steamer Pathan, on suspicion of smuggling arms to Japan. Nan Chen continued to serve in the Chinese navy after the Xinhai Revolution. It was later used as a training vessel and was stricken in 1919.
