= Chinese frigate Hai'an =

Chinese wooden steam frigate

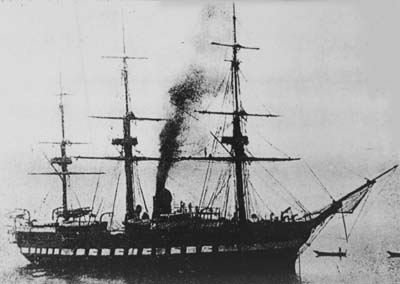
- A Hai'an-class frigate, either Hai'an or Yuyuen

History

China
- Name: Hai'an (海安)
- Builder: Kiangnan Arsenal
- Launched: 24 May 1872
- Fate: Scrapped after 1885

General characteristics
- Type: Wooden steam frigate
- Displacement: 2,850 long tons (2,896 t)
- Length: 372 ft (113 m) oa; 300 feet (91 m)
- Beam: 42 feet (13 m)
- Draught: 21 feet (6.4 m)
- Installed power: 1,750 ihp (1,300 kW)
- Propulsion: Reciprocating engine, single shaft
- Speed: 12 knots (22 km/h; 14 mph)
- Complement: 372
- Armament: 2 × 9-inch Muzzle-loading rifles; 24 x 70-pounder Whitworth naval gun

Hai'an (Chinese: 海安; pinyin: Hǎi'ān; Wade–Giles: Hai-an), originally named Zhen'an (simplified Chinese: 镇安; traditional Chinese: 鎮安; pinyin: Zhèn'ān; Wade–Giles: Chen-an), was a wooden steam powered frigate built for the Imperial Chinese Navy. She was the lead ship of the Hai'an class, which consisted of her and her sister Yuyuen. They were the largest vessels built in China until the 1930s; they each ran over budget and used sub-standard building materials which limited their use. Hai'an was initially used as a training ship, and later saw action in the Sino-French War as a potential blockship, being scrapped as a hulk following the war.

== Design ==
Hai'an was the lead ship of the Hai'an class of wooden steam powered frigates. She was constructed at the dockyard at the Kiangnan Arsenal for the Imperial Chinese Navy's Nanyang Fleet. Hai'an and her sister ship Yuyuen were the largest vessels built in China until the cruiser Ping Hai in 1931. Hai'an was originally named Chen-an, and measured 2,630 long tons (2,672 t) long overall, with a beam of 42 feet (13 m) and an average draft of 21 feet (6.4 m). The propulsion system consisted of a 1,750 ihp (1,300 kW) reciprocating engine with a single shaft, enabling a cruising speed of 12 knots (22 km/h; 14 mph). She was also equipped with a sailing rig across her three masts. She had a crew complement of 372.

Her armament initially consisted of two 9-inch (229 mm) muzzle-loading rifles (MLRs) mounted on the upper deck and 24 70-pounder Whitworth naval guns, the latter mounted in broadsides. During a later overhaul these were subsequently replaced Krupp guns of varying sizes, with two 8.2-inch (208 mm) guns placed on the upper deck, and the broadside replaced with four 5.9-inch (150 mm) and 20 4.7-inch (119 mm) guns. Hai'an was built at a cost of 355,190 taels; the cost of Hai'an and Yuyuen exceeded the budget and resulted in their limited use initially. Furthermore, due to the use of low quality pine from Oregon and Vancouver in the construction of the vessels meant that the timbers were showing obvious signs of rot after a few months of use.

== Career ==
Hai'an was launched on 24 May 1872 from the Kiangnan Arsenal, ahead of her sister ship 19 months later. The cost of the two ships meant that Yuyuen was not initially manned as there was not sufficient funds remaining to pay for her crew. Meanwhile, Hai'an spent the majority of her early life as a training vessel. Both Hai'an-class frigates were known for being unseaworthy.

During the Sino-French War, Hai'an was prepared to be used as a blockship should the French Navy attempt to attack Shanghai. She was filled with stones and towed out to the bar of the Huangpu River (then romanized as "Whangpoo"). As this attack did not occur, she was towed back into Shanghai after the end of the war, and was disposed of as a hulk within a few years.
