= Zhenhai, Ningbo =

Zhenhai 镇海区 Chinhai
- District
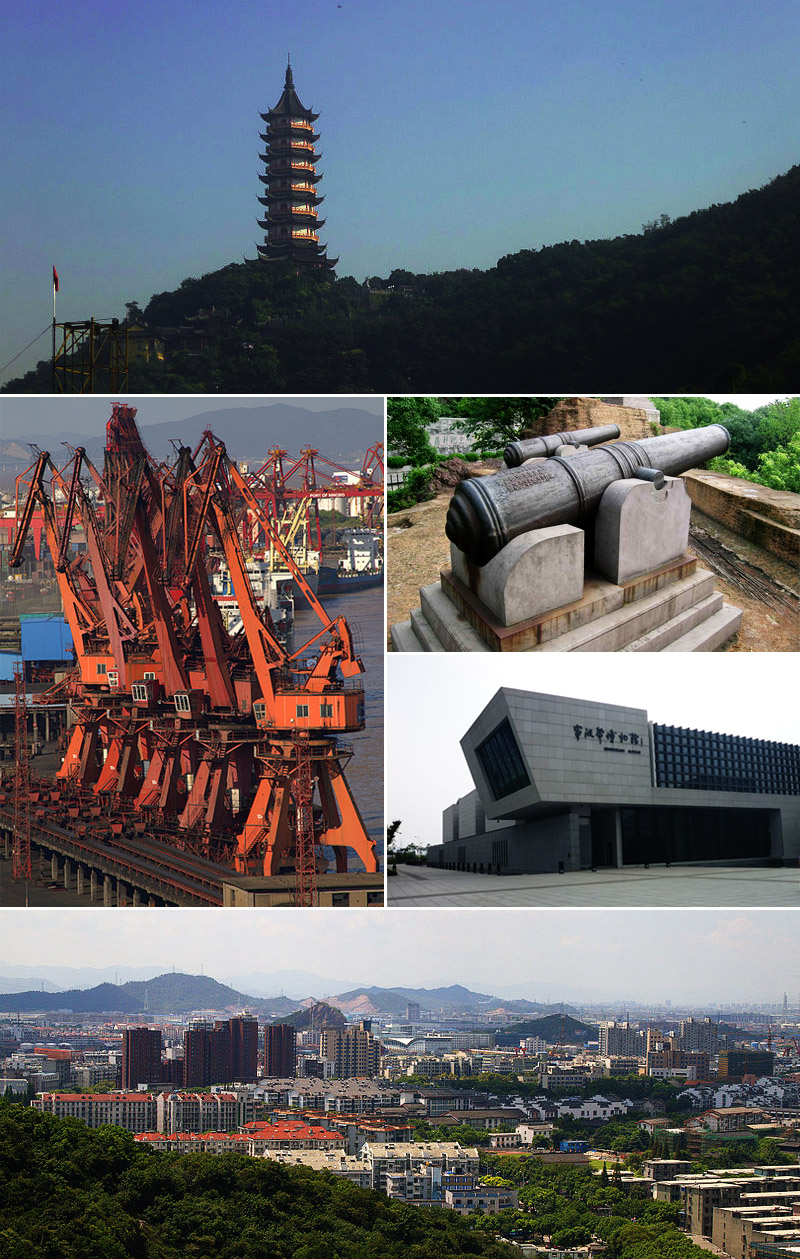
- Clockwise from the top: Zhaobao Hill, Zhenhai Harbor Area, Anyuan Fort, Ningbobang Museum, Zhenhai Skyline

- Zhenhai District in Ningbo City

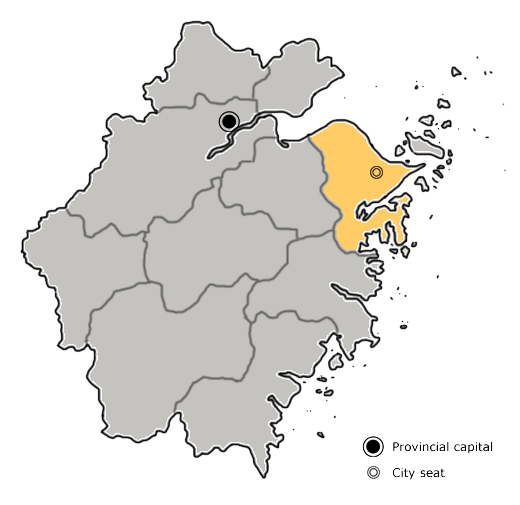
- Ningbo in Zhejiang
- Coordinates: 29°58′N 121°43′E
- Country: People's Republic of China
- Province: Zhejiang
- Sub-provincial city: Ningbo

Area
  - Total: 237.06 km^{2} (91.53 sq mi)

Population (2020)
  - Total: 510,500
- Time zone: UTC+8 (China Standard)
- Website: www.zh.gov.cn

Zhenhai
- Traditional Chinese: 鎮海
- Simplified Chinese: 镇海
- Literal meaning: Suppressing the Sea
Transcriptions
Standard Mandarin
- Hanyu Pinyin: Zhènhǎi
- Wade–Giles: Chen-hai
Wu
- Romanization: Tzen-he

Zhenhai (Note: Other romanizations of Zhenhai include Chin-hae, Ching-hai, Chinhai, and Chên-hai.) is a district and former county of Ningbo city in Zhejiang Province in eastern China. It has a population of 200,000.

== History ==
Zhenhai's city walls previously covered a circuit of 3 miles (5 km) and rose to 20 feet (6 m). The British captured Zhenhai on 10 October 1841 during the First Opium War, dismantling its former citadel. The Zhenhai Coastal Battery was the site of the 1885 Battle of Zhenhai during the Sino-French War.

In the later 19th century, Zhenhai was protected from the sea by a dike about 3 miles (4.8 km) long, made of large blocks of hewn granite.

Zhenhai has suffered severe long-term air pollution mainly emanating from the Ningbo Petro-Chemical Economic and Technical Development Zone built on its eastern coast. The zone is home to nearly 200 chemical plants including Zhenhai Refining and Chemical Corporation (ZRCC), a subsidiary of Sinopec and the largest oil refinery in China, LG-Yongxing, the largest ABS plastic producer in China and Zhenhai Port Liquid Chemical Dock, the largest liquid chemical dock in China. In September, 2007, 400 tones of acrylonitrile leaked from the LG-Yongxing plant and polluted air and underground water around adjacent areas. In late April, 2012, three million bees died in an orchard in Xiepu Town next to the Petro-Chemical Zone because of pollutants discharged by a chemical plant. Research has shown that the ratio of deaths from cancer in Zhenhai rose significantly between 2007 and 2009.

From May 16 to 17, 2002, residents in Zhenhai launched protests against environmental degradation caused by the chemical industry, blocking the district's traffic on its main streets. In October, 2012, angry people staged demonstrations against a giant petro-chemical project scheduled by ZRCC and clashed with police. The 50 billion yuan ($8 billion) integrated investment project, according to some reports, will affect more than 9800 households. Many argue that the environment in Zhenhai has been tremendously overloaded and the new project will bring even more harm to the ecosystem.

== Administrative divisions ==
Subdistricts:

- Zhaobaoshan Subdistrict (招宝山街道), Jiaochuan Subdistrict (蛟川街道), Luotuo Subdistrict (骆驼街道), Zhuangshi Subdistrict (庄市街道)

Towns:

- Jiulonghu (九龙湖镇), Xiepu (澥浦镇)

== Climate ==
Climate data for Zhenhai District, elevation 4 m (13 ft), (1991–2020 normals)
Month	Jan	Feb	Mar	Apr	May	Jun	Jul	Aug	Sep	Oct	Nov	Dec	Year
Mean daily maximum °C (°F)	9.7 (49.5)	11.4 (52.5)	15.9 (60.6)	21.6 (70.9)	26.0 (78.8)	28.4 (83.1)	33.5 (92.3)	33.2 (91.8)	28.4 (83.1)	23.7 (74.7)	18.4 (65.1)	12.0 (53.6)	21.8 (71.3)
Daily mean °C (°F)	5.5 (41.9)	7.1 (44.8)	10.9 (51.6)	16.1 (61.0)	21.1 (70.0)	24.4 (75.9)	28.8 (83.8)	28.8 (83.8)	24.6 (76.3)	19.5 (67.1)	13.8 (56.8)	7.3 (45.1)	17.3 (63.2)
Mean daily minimum °C (°F)	2.1 (35.8)	3.5 (38.3)	6.7 (44.1)	11.4 (52.5)	16.9 (62.4)	21.3 (70.3)	25.3 (77.5)	25.4 (77.7)	21.4 (70.5)	15.9 (60.6)	10.1 (50.2)	3.5 (38.3)	13.6 (56.5)
Average precipitation mm (inches)	82.9 (3.26)	95.3 (3.75)	123.1 (4.85)	103.2 (4.06)	138.0 (5.43)	260.7 (10.26)	181.6 (7.15)	220.0 (8.66)	209.2 (8.24)	107.1 (4.22)	104.8 (4.13)	79.4 (3.13)	1,705.3 (67.14)
Average precipitation days (≥ 0.1 mm)	12.1	13.3	14.8	12.3	14.1	18.1	12.2	13.9	14.6	9.5	13.0	10.6	158.5
Average snowy days	2.8	2.5	0.4	0	0	0	0	0	0	0	0	1.3	7
Average relative humidity (%)	78	79	76	73	75	83	77	77	79	77	80	76	78
Mean monthly sunshine hours	99.0	93.8	135.2	160.9	163.0	105.6	208.4	209.2	141.7	144.0	102.2	119.7	1,682.7
Percentage possible sunshine	30	30	36	42	39	25	49	52	39	41	32	38	38
Source: China Meteorological Administration

== Notable individuals ==
- Hu Zongnan
- Run Run Shaw
- Yang Fujia
- Ye Chengzhong
