= Chinese frigate Yuyuen =

Chinese wooden steam frigate

- A Haien-class frigate, either Haian or Yuyuen

History

Imperial China
- Name: Yuyuen (馭遠)
- Builder: Kiangnan Arsenal
- Launched: 23 December 1873
- Fate: Sunk, 15 February 1885

General characteristics
- Type: Wooden steam frigate
- Displacement: 2,630 long tons (2,672 t)
- Length: 300 feet (91 m)
- Beam: 42 feet (13 m)
- Draught: 21 feet (6.4 m)
- Installed power: 1,750 ihp (1,300 kW)
- Propulsion: Reciprocating engine, single shaft
- Speed: 12 knots (22 km/h; 14 mph)
- Complement: 372
- Armament: 2 × 9-inch Muzzle-loading rifles; 24 x 70-pounder Whitworth naval gun

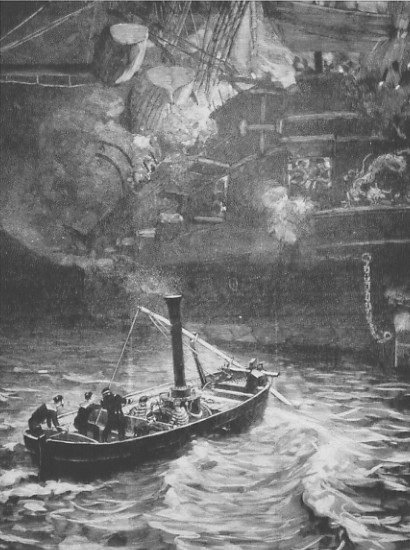
French Navy torpedo launch attacking Yuyuan in Shipu Bay, 14 February 1885.

Yuyuen (Chinese: 馭遠; pinyin: Yùyuǎn; Wade–Giles: Yu-yuen) was a wooden steam powered frigate built for the Imperial Chinese Navy. She was one of two ships of the Haian class, which consisted of her and her sister Haian. They were the largest vessels built in China until the 1930s; they each ran over budget and used sub-standard building materials which limited their use. She was active in the defence of Nanking during the Sino-French War, and formed part of a squadron which was sent to relieve the blockade of Formosa. Yuyuen was sunk in Shipu Bay during the Battle of Shipu on 15 February 1885.

== Design ==
Yuyuen was a Haian-class wooden steam powered frigate. She was constructed at the dockyard at the Kiangnan Arsenal for the Imperial Chinese Navy's Nanyang Fleet. Yuyuen and her sister ship Haian were the largest vessels built in China until the cruiser Ping Hai in 1931. Yuyuen displaced 2,630 long tons (2,672 t) and measured 300 feet (91 m) long overall, with a beam of 42 feet (13 m) and an average draft of 21 feet (6.4 m). The propulsion system consisted of a 1,750 indicated horsepower (1,300 kilowatts) reciprocating engine with a single shaft, enabling a cruising speed of 12 knots (22 km/h; 14 mph). She was also equipped with a sailing rig across her three masts. She had a crew complement of 372.

Her armament initially consisted of two 9-inch (229 mm) muzzle-loading rifles (MLRs) mounted on the upper deck and 24 70-pounder Whitworth naval guns, the latter mounted in broadsides. During a later overhaul these were subsequently replaced with Krupp guns of varying sizes, with two 8.2-inch (208 mm) guns placed on the upper deck, and the broadside replaced with four 5.9-inch (150 mm) and 20 4.7-inch (119 mm) guns. Yuyuen was built at a cost of 318,717 taels; the cost of Haian and Yuyuen exceeded the budget and resulted in their limited use initially. Furthermore, due to the use of low quality pine from Oregon and Vancouver in the construction of the vessels meant that the timbers were showing obvious signs of rot after a few months of use.

== Career ==
Yuyuen was launched on 23 December 1873 from the Kiagnan Arsenal, 19 months after her sister ship. Yuyuen was not initially manned after launch to recoup some of the overspend on construction costs. She was instead used as a storeship and guard ship in the Wusong District, Shanghai.

Following the attack by the French Navy at the Battle of Foochow during the Sino-French War in 1884, she formed part of a squadron whose objective was to hunt down French vessels following an anticipated attack on Nanking. Despite being out of date by that point, she was put "into fighting trim". The other vessels in the squadron consisted of the cruisers Kai Che, Nan Shuin and Nan Thin. But instead of attacking Nanking, the French forces targeted Formosa instead. The Nanking squadron was sent to break a blockade of the island by the French Navy, being joined by the sloop-of-war Teng Ch'ing. The fleet was under the command of Admiral Wu Ang-k'ang, while Yuyuen was commanded by Captain Chin Yung-chai; of the commanding officers, only the captain of Teng Ch'ing had experience with any sea training.

=== Battle of Shipu ===
The ships left Shanghai in December 1884, making slow progress south as the crew were trained en route. They reached Wenzhou in January 1885, and began to return north briefly. They made contact with the French navy as they left Shipu Bay on 14 February. The Chinese ships moved to attack in a V-shaped formation, with the slower Yuyuen bringing up the rear. The French fleet saw the distance gathering between Yuyuen and the rest of the Chinese ships and sought to exploit this by moving in-between. Yuyuen soon lost sight of the Chinese cruisers in the poor weather, and Admiral Wu on Teng Ch'ing realised that his vessel could not keep up either. The two ships moved back into Shipu Bay, the favourable currents allowing them to stay ahead of the French ships.

The duo were blockaded in by the French ships, who could not enter the bay due to their deeper drafts. During the following night, two attempts were made to sink the ships using French steam powered cutters. An initial attack at around 10:00 pm on 14 February was repulsed by fire from the Chinese ships, but a second attempt at 4:00 am on 15 February by cutters from the battleship Bayard were successful after lying hidden among the various fishing vessels of various sizes within the bay. The cutters closed so near to Yuyuen that the chief engineer was able to reach over the side and hit a French sailor with his gun sponge. Small arms fire was exchanged between the crew. Of the three cutters, one successfully detonated a spar torpedo under Yuyuen, destroying the cutter in the process.

Teng Ch'ing was also sunk, but the French forces claimed that it was not as a result of their attack. American adviser L. C. Arlington was stationed on Yuyuen at the time, and later reported the chaotic scene as the ship was attacked. Some of the crew jumped over the side, while others tried to lower boats. At no point had there been any attempt by the Chinese to fend off the French cutters, with the shore batteries only firing after the attack on Yuyuen. One of the shells fired by the batteries hit Teng Ch'ing, potentially causing her sinking. The two cutters retreated, relatively undamaged. This was the final time during the war that Chinese vessels were sunk, and Yuyuen was the largest vessel sunk during the conflict.

Crew from the tugboat Fubleo arrived at Shipu on 18 February, and later gave a report to the China Daily. Yuyuen's hull had sunk below the water and was sitting upright with her sails still flying. Local villagers had already begun looting the vessel, having cut away topsail from the mizzen-mast and were in the process of removing the spinnaker and retrieving one of the ship's hatches. When the Fubleo crew arrived in the village, they found the surviving crew of Yuyuen and Ten Ch'ing. They reported that the villages had attempted to prevent them from coming ashore, but they had been convinced through force of arms. The family of Captain Chin were subsequently arrested, with Chinese authorities demanding that the ships were not sunk under fire from the French, but instead by having holes drilled in the bottom of the hulls so that the crew could have an excuse for abandoning the ships. Unsuccessful attempts were later made to raise the Yuyuen.
