= Trần Cao Vân =

Vietnamese official (1866–1916)

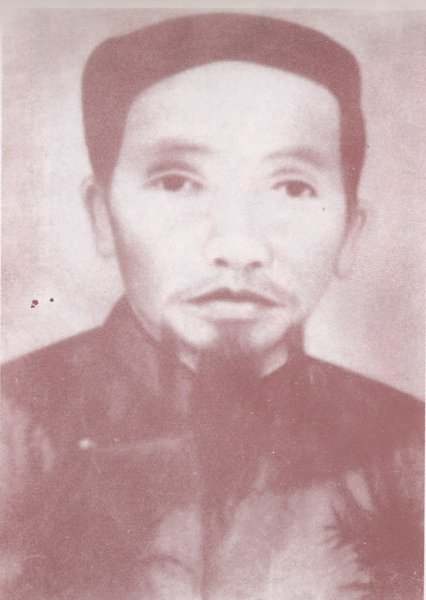
Trần Cao Vân

Trần Cao Vân (陳高雲, 1866–1916) was a mandarin of the Nguyễn dynasty who was best known for his activities in attempting to expel the French colonial powers in Vietnam. He orchestrated an attempt to expel the French and install Emperor Duy Tân as the boy ruler of an independent Vietnam, but the uprising failed. Vân was executed while Duy Tân was exiled by the French.

== Early life ==
Vân was born in the village of Phu Cu, Go Noi Island in the prefecture of Điện Bàn in Quảng Nam Province in central Vietnam. The prefecture was also the home area of General Hoàng Diệu, who commanded the garrison Citadel of Hanoi when it fell to France in 1882 and then committed suicide, marking the start of colonisation.

Vân's father was believed to be of scholar-gentry background, but never passed the imperial examination system. Instead, he made a living for himself by running a silkworm and rice production business. Vân was the first son of his father's wife (his father had three wives) and started his formal studies at the age of nine, and by the age of thirteen was regarded as the most adept in his village at "capping" parallel sentences.

== French capture of Hanoi ==
In 1882 his outlook on life changed when news came in from Hanoi that the city had fallen to French military forces and that Hoàng Diệu had hanged himself. Hoàng Diệu's body was brought back to the area for a full dress funeral, generating a large upswell in anti-French and anti-Catholic nationalist sentiment. By 1885, Vân had concluded that pursuing a career in the imperial court through the mandarinate examination was pointless in the face of French control of the monarchy, so he bade farewell to his family and entered a Taoist temple in the mountains of Đại Lộc District. He was persuaded to come out of his mountain abode in 1888 due to family pressure, and he took the regional exams, but he failed and returned to his mountain.

Although the religious abode may have suggested a purely spiritual lifestyle, Vân also used the temple as a meeting place for anti-colonial discussions, while another scholar friend travelled the adjacent districts attempting to make contacts. The French caught wind of Vân's activities, so a colonial inspection party travelled the temple, resulting in Vân's departure for Bình Định Province to work as a geography teacher. Vân quickly garnered a reputation in Bình Định as a geomancer and soon had a following of anti-French mystics. In 1898, he was involved in a local uprising, which was unsuccessful. As a result, he fled westward into the hills near the border, as the French swept west, burning down villages. He then returned to his home in Quảng Nam without being captured by colonial authorities. However, in 1908, he was arrested for allegedly inciting tax riots in his locality.

== Imprisonment ==
As a result, Vân was held in jail in Hội An for a year while his activities in the past in Bình Định were investigated. After this, he was jailed for six years in Côn Lôn Island.

However, by 1913, Vân had been transferred back to the mainland and was returned to Hội An. Two of his mandarin friends at the court in Huế managed to get Vân released so that he could be reunited with his dying father. Soon, Vân was again involved in anti-colonial activities. He joined a group in Quảng Ngãi Province that maintained contacts with the Quang Phục Hội, a leading overseas revolutionary activist group of the time, mainly in southern China near the Vietnamese border. His group briefly contemplated orchestrating their own military ambushes in central Vietnam, to coincided with cross-border raids by the Quang Phục Hội in the north, but nothing materialised in central Vietnam.

== Plot to restore power to Duy Tân ==
At the time, The Emperor of Vietnam was Duy Tân, who was still a boy and French colonial authorities had hoped that he would be a pliant puppet who would not seek to inspire revolt among the populace. However, Duy Tân was to prove more troublesome than his father Thành Thái, whom the French removed after proving to be too erratic and uncooperative. A few of the mandarins in the court felt that Duy Tân had an independent and inquisitive streak that could be exploited and used as a symbol for an anti-French revolt in the central provinces. At the time, the Vietnamese soldiers who had been recruited by the French for domestic purposes were also restive; there was a general fear that with the outbreak of World War I, they would be sent to the frontline in Europe.

Can arranged for a secret meeting with Duy Tân by bribing the royal chauffeur, and he managed to gain the emperor's full agreement to attempt a coup against the French, complete with permission to use the royal seal on secret orders to participants. The seal allowed the plotters to gain a much larger following. Small armed units were prepared with the intention of seizing the strategically important towns of Huế, Quảng Nam and Quảng Ngãi. The plan was for Duy Tân to escape the palace, then signal assaults on the French installations with artillery and elephants, as well as a royal order declaring a general revolt. The signal was to be passed by igniting large firewires southwards on the Hải Vân Pass. The rebels had contemplated other plans, including an attempt to set up a rebel capital further south at Qui Nhơn and seizing the central port of Da Nang in the hope of attracting supplies from Germany, who were currently pitted against France in World War I. Another effort was made to attempt to convince the French commander of the Mang Ca colonial garrison in Huế to defect to the rebels. The Vietnamese royalists had hoped that the German born Frenchman would switch sides due to the situation in World War I.

However, the French got wind of the plan. A mandarin in Quảng Ngãi sensed a plot was brewing and he forced one of the low level participants to confessing to what he knew. The intelligence was passed to resident superieur in Huế, who then realised that there was a very large number of Vietnamese soldiers’ families evacuating from Huế. In Quảng Nam, information was found indicating that seizures of several local forts was planned.

The French responded by confiscating the firearms of the Vietnamese troops serving in the colonial army, and confined them to their barracks. More details were extracted from several conspirators who were suspected of rousing Vietnamese soldiers in the barracks.

== 2 May 1916 uprising and aftermath ==
However, Vân and the plot leaders were unaware that the French had discovered the conspiracy, and went ahead with their planned upring on the night of May 2, 1916, spiriting Duy Tân out of the imperial palace. The signal mechanism also failed to work as planned, and those soldiers who were not already confined to barracks simply wandered away from their planned roles, with the exception of a unit at Tam Kỳ, who killed several Frenchmen before they were overpowered.

The evacuation was also slow to be implemented, and Duy Tân and his entourage were captured at a Buddhist temple south of Huế. Vân and five others were executed, while lower level plotters were sent to various jails and penal colonies. Duy Tân was exiled to Réunion in the Indian Ocean to join his father Thành Thái.

== Legacy ==
The Duy Tân plot was regarded as the last purely monarchist anticolonial action of any note in Vietnam, similar to the Cần Vương movement of the 1880s and 1890s rather than their more noted compatriots such as Phan Bội Châu and Phan Chu Trinh, who were open to the prospect of republicanism. Most cities in Vietnam have named major streets after him.
