= Nguyễn Thị Định (mother of Duy Tân) =

Wife of Vietnamese emperor Thành Thái (1883–1972)

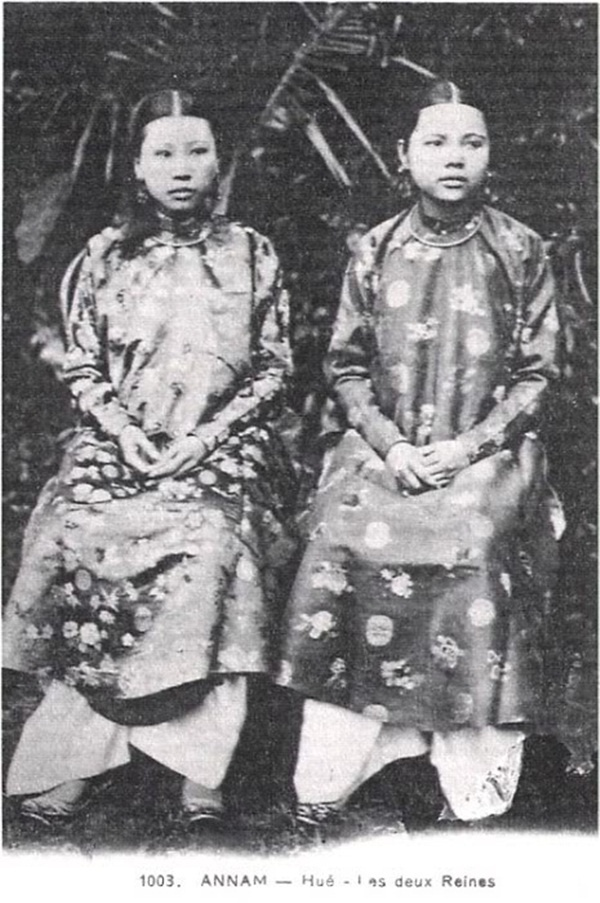
Two concubines of King Thanh Thai (1907), believed to be Nguyen Thi Dinh (right) and Nguyen Gia Thi Anh (left).

Nguyễn Thị Định (阮氏定, 1883 – 1972) was a wife of the Vietnamese emperor Thành Thái, and the queen mother of the emperor's fifth son, the boy emperor Duy Tân (reigned 1907-1916). Following the abdication, forced by the French, of Thành Thái, the new boy emperor's mother resided at court as queen mother, while Thành Thái was relegated to a duke, and lived with his large retinue of wives and retainers away from court. This did not prevent the former emperor for pressuring his wife, the queen mother, for funds. She, with her husband and son, are buried in the tomb of Dục Đức.
