= Dương Thị Thục =

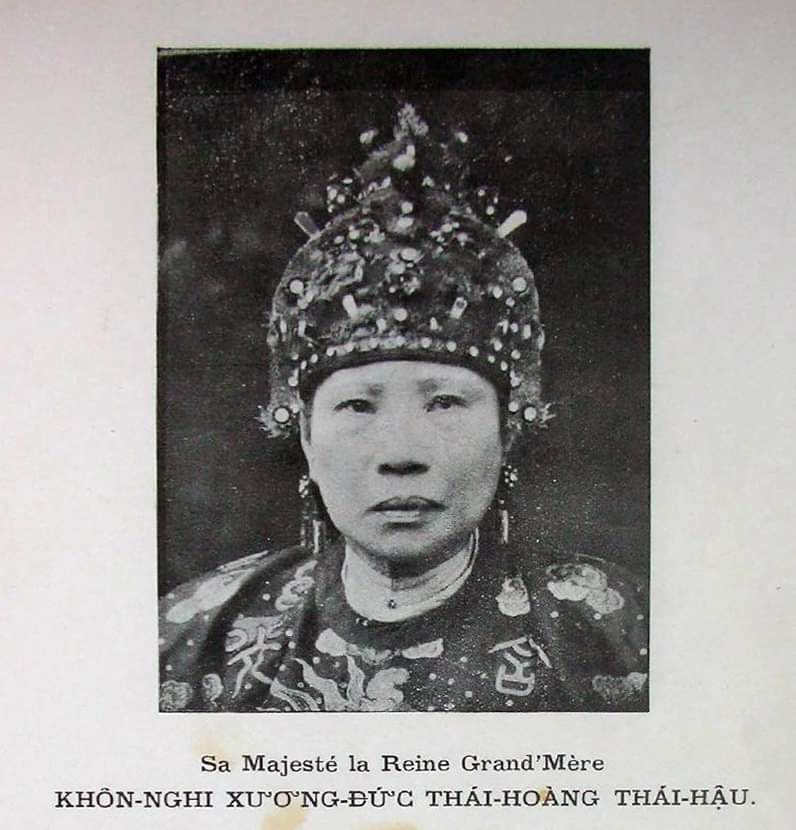
A portrait of empress dowager Dương Thị Thục.

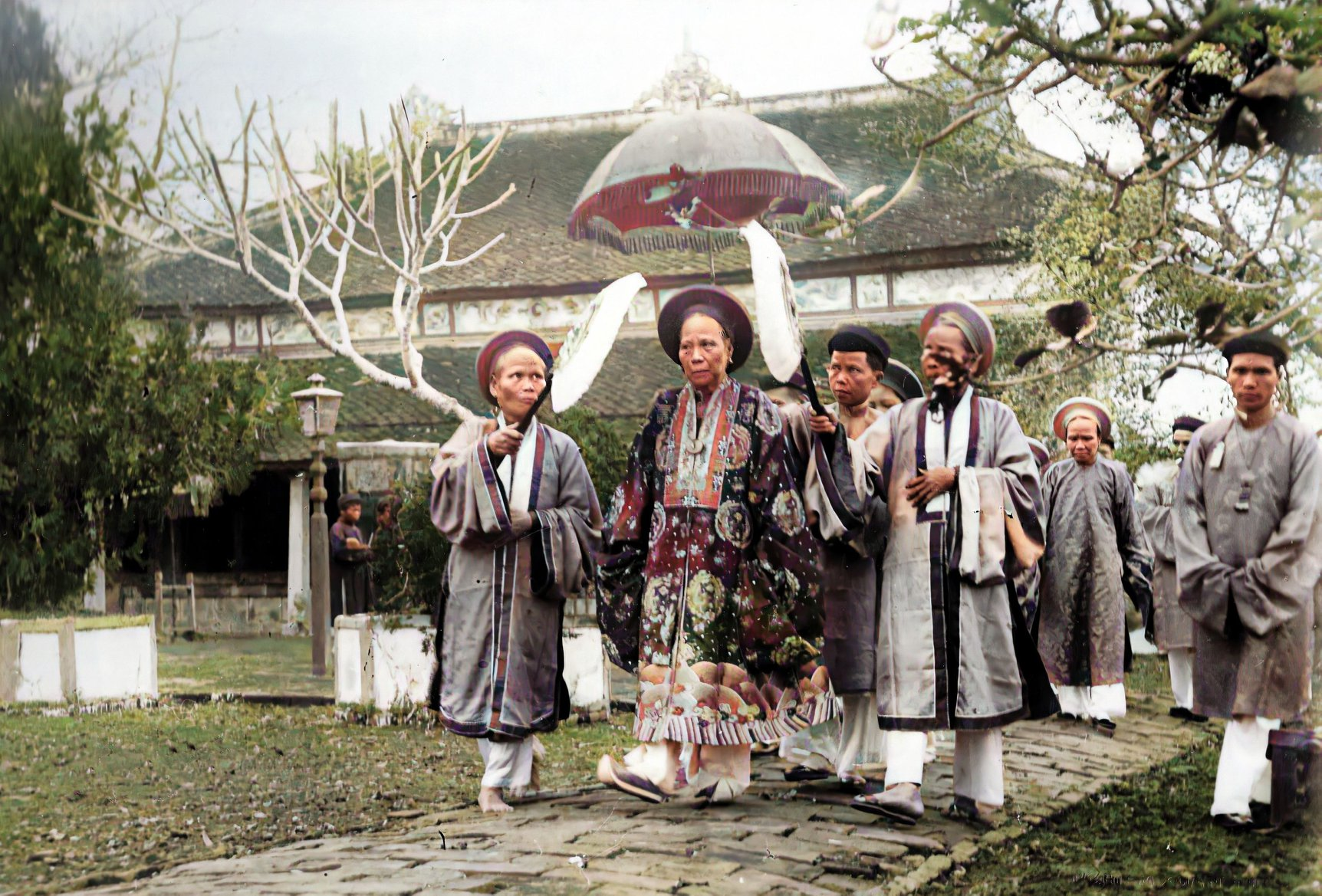
Dương Thị Thục, Mother of emperor Khài Định visiting ancestral temple of Nguyễn dynasty in Thanh Hóa, 17/3/1935.

Dương Thị Thục (chữ Hán: 楊氏熟; 1868–1944), was an empress dowager of Vietnam between 1923 and 1933. She was the mother of emperor Khải Định of the Nguyễn dynasty. She was the concubine of emperor Đồng Khánh. She had never been empress consort, but was given the title of empress dowager in her capacity as the mother of the emperor.
