= Đồng Khánh =

Emperor Đồng Khánh 同慶帝
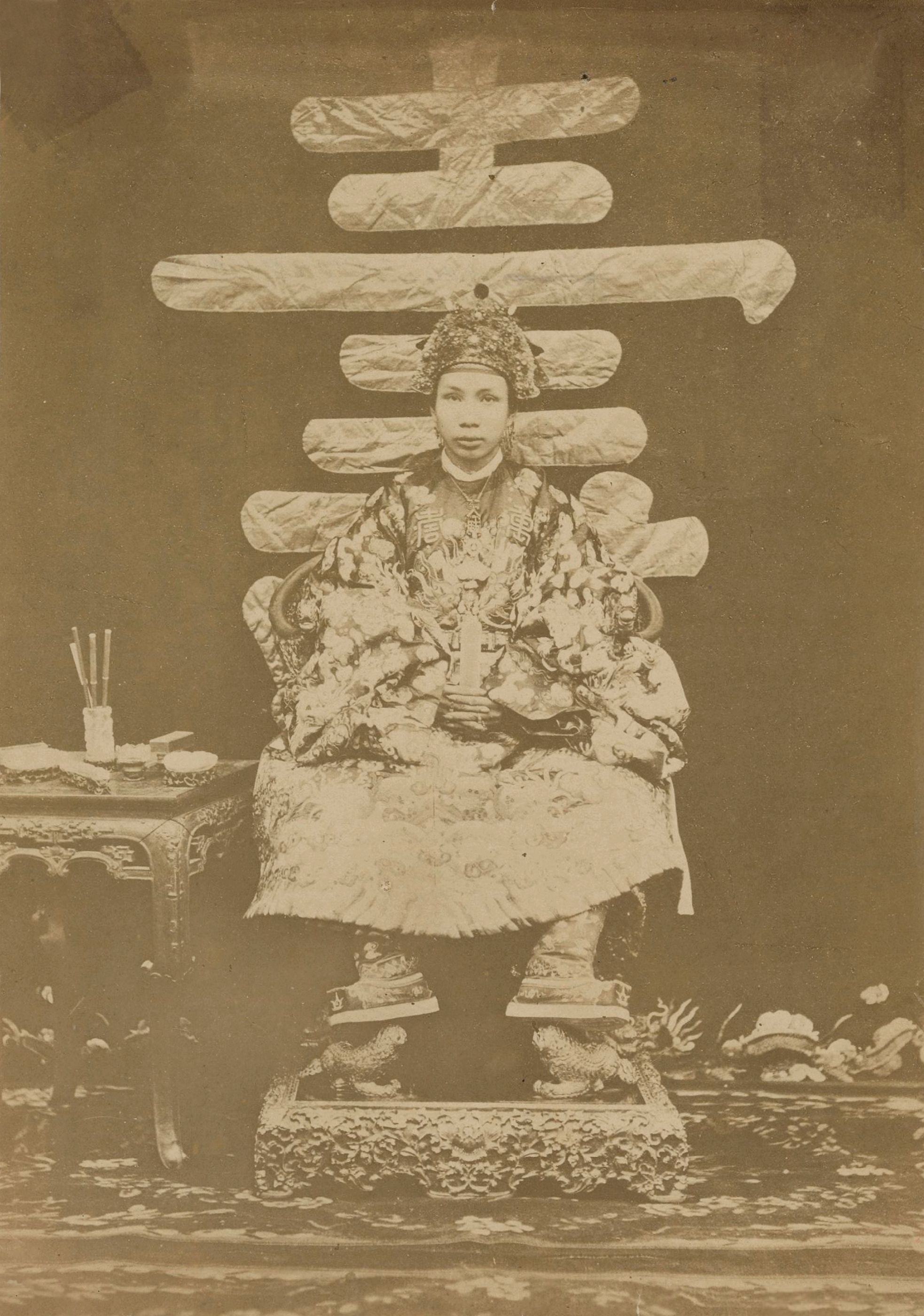
- Emperor Đồng Khánh on throne in coronation day

Emperor of Đại Nam under French protectorate of Annam and Tonkin
- Reign: 19 September 1885 – 28 January 1889
- Predecessor: Hàm Nghi
- Successor: Thành Thái

Emperor of the Nguyễn dynasty
- Reign: 19 September 1885 – 28 January 1889
- Predecessor: Hàm Nghi
- Successor: Thành Thái
- Born: 19 February 1864; Imperial City of Huế, Đại Nam
- Died: 28 January 1889 (aged 24); Càn Thành hall (乾成殿), Imperial City of Huế, Annam, French Indochina
- Burial: Tư Lăng
- Spouse: 11 concubines
- Issue: 9 including 6 sons and 3 daughter prince Nguyễn Phúc Bửu Đảo
Names
- Nguyễn Phúc Ưng Thị (阮福膺豉); Nguyễn Phúc Ưng Kỷ (阮福膺祺); Nguyễn Phúc Ưng Đường (阮福膺禟); Nguyễn Phúc Biện (阮福昪)
Era name and dates
- Đồng Khánh (同慶): 1885–1889
Posthumous name
- Hoằng Liệt Thông Thiết Mẫn Huệ Thuần Hoàng Đế (弘烈聰哲敏惠純皇帝); Phối Thiên Minh Vận Hiếu Đức Nhân Vũ Vĩ Công Hoằng Liệt Thông Thiết Mẫn Huệ Thuần Hoàng Đế (配天明運孝德仁武偉功弘烈聰哲敏惠純皇帝) (1916)
Temple name
- Cảnh Tông (景宗)
- House: Nguyễn Phúc
- Father: Nguyễn Phúc Hồng Cai (son of Thiệu Trị)
- Mother: Concubine Bùi Thị Thanh
- Religion: Ruism, Buddhism

Đồng Khánh (Hanoi: [ɗəwŋ͡m˨˩ xajŋ̟˧˦], chữ Hán: 同慶, lit. "collective celebration"; 19 February 1864 – 28 January 1889), born Nguyễn Phúc Ưng Kỷ (阮福膺祺) or Nguyễn Phúc Ưng Đường (阮福膺禟), also known as Chánh Mông (正蒙), was the ninth emperor of the Nguyễn dynasty of Vietnam. He reigned four years between 1885 and 1889. His royal temple name was Cảnh Tông (景宗).

== Biography ==
Đồng Khánh was born on 19 February 1864 in the Imperial City of Huế. His childhood name was Chánh Mông because he was brought up in Chánh Mông palace. Đồng Khánh was the eldest son of Prince Nguyễn Phúc Hồng Cai, a son of emperor Thiệu Trị, and his concubine Bùi Thị Thanh.

As his uncle, Emperor Tự Đức, had no children, Đồng Khánh was adopted and given the title Kiên Giang quận công (Duke of Kiên Giang).

== Rule ==
After the French armies captured the city of Huế and the Imperial city fell to the French, the court regents Nguyễn Văn Tường and Tôn Thất Thuyết took the young Emperor Hàm Nghi and escaped from the Purple Forbidden City of Huế, and took him to Tân Sở in the mountains as the figurehead of a revolutionary movement against the French. To take away the legitimacy of Hàm Nghi, general de Courcy and résident de Champeaux of France asked the empress dowager Nghi Thiên to enthrone Hàm Nghi's elder half brother prince Nguyễn Phúc Ưng Kỷ. On 19 September 1885 with the backing of the governor of Annam, Prince Nguyễn Phúc Ưng Kỷ was crowned as the ninth emperor of Đại Nam with the era name of Đồng Khánh.

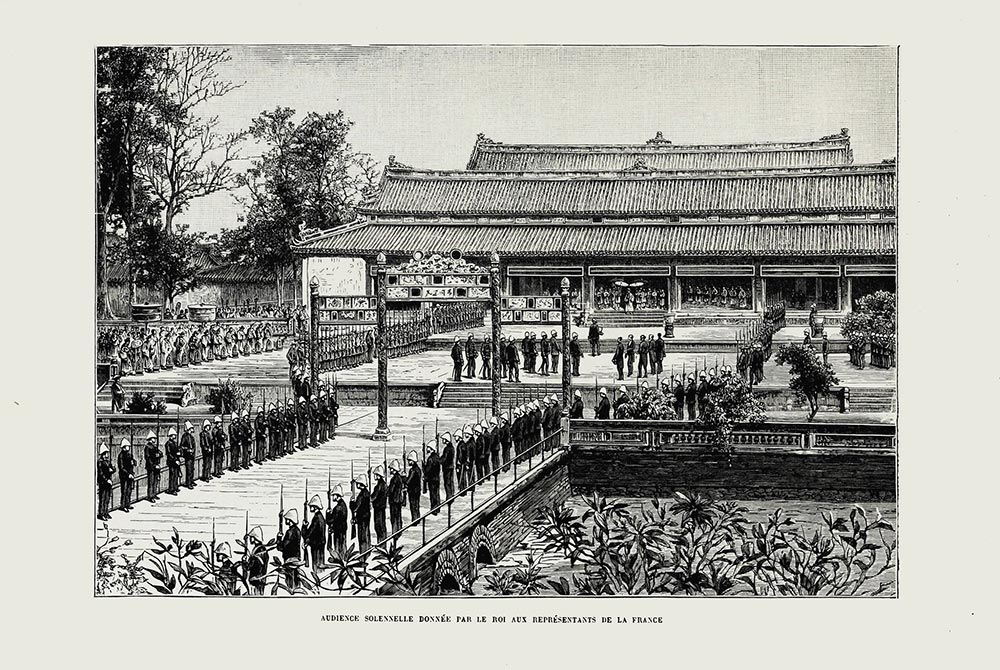
Welcome ceremony of French diplomats by Emperor Đồng Khánh at Thái Hòa Điện (太和殿), 1886

Đồng Khánh was pro-French, which was noted in the diary of Trần Trọng Kim:

"Emperor Đồng Khánh had a gentle personality, loved to wear luxurious jewelry and adopted French culture[,] therefore [the] French colonial government gave favor to him. After the dethroned emperor Hàm Nghi fled to Quảng Bình, Đồng Khánh accepted the French request of travelling to Quảng Bình to persuade Hàm Nghi and his loyal subjects [to] surrender but [was] unsuccessful. After that, Hàm Nghi was betrayed by his loyal subject Trương Quang Ngọc[;] then he was captured by [the] French and exiled [to] Algérie."

== Death ==
On 28 January 1889, Đồng Khánh died aged 24 after reigning for three years. He was granted the posthumous name Hoằng Liệt Thông Thiết Mẫn Huệ Thuần Hoàng Đế (弘烈聰哲敏惠純皇帝), with the temple name Cảnh Tông (景宗).

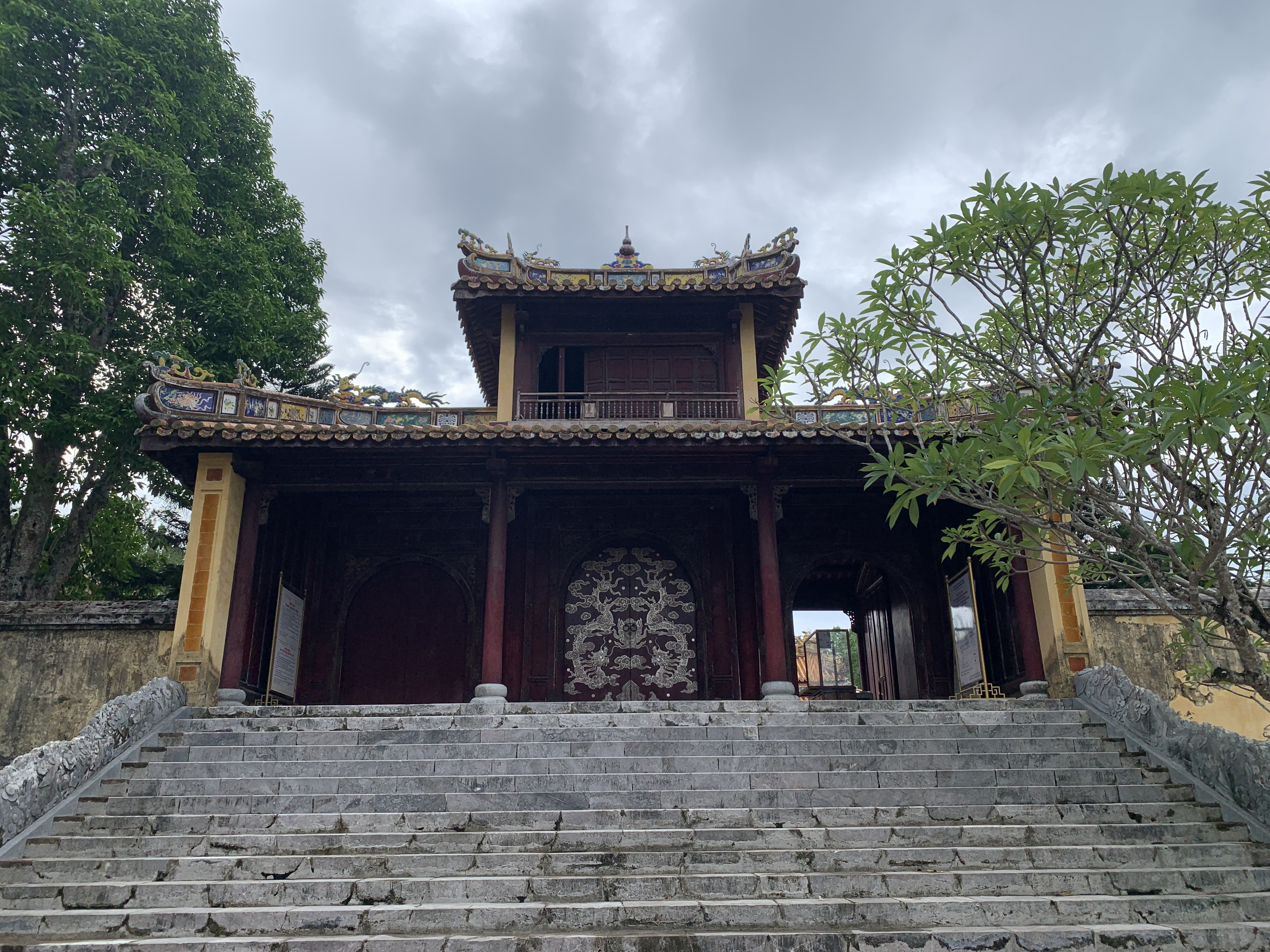
Main gate to mausoleum of Đồng Khánh

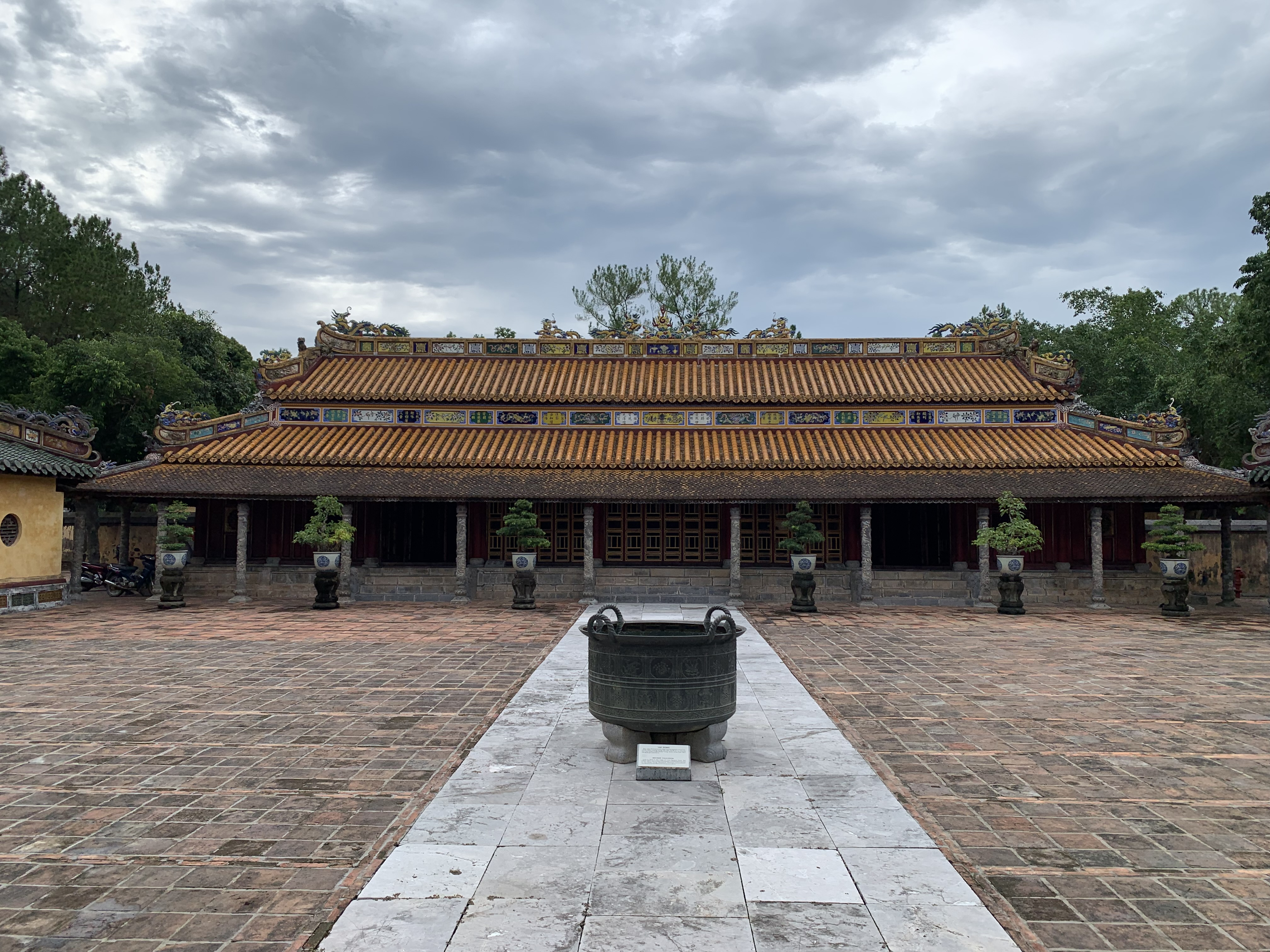
Main temple of mausoleum, Ngưng Hy Điện (凝禧殿)

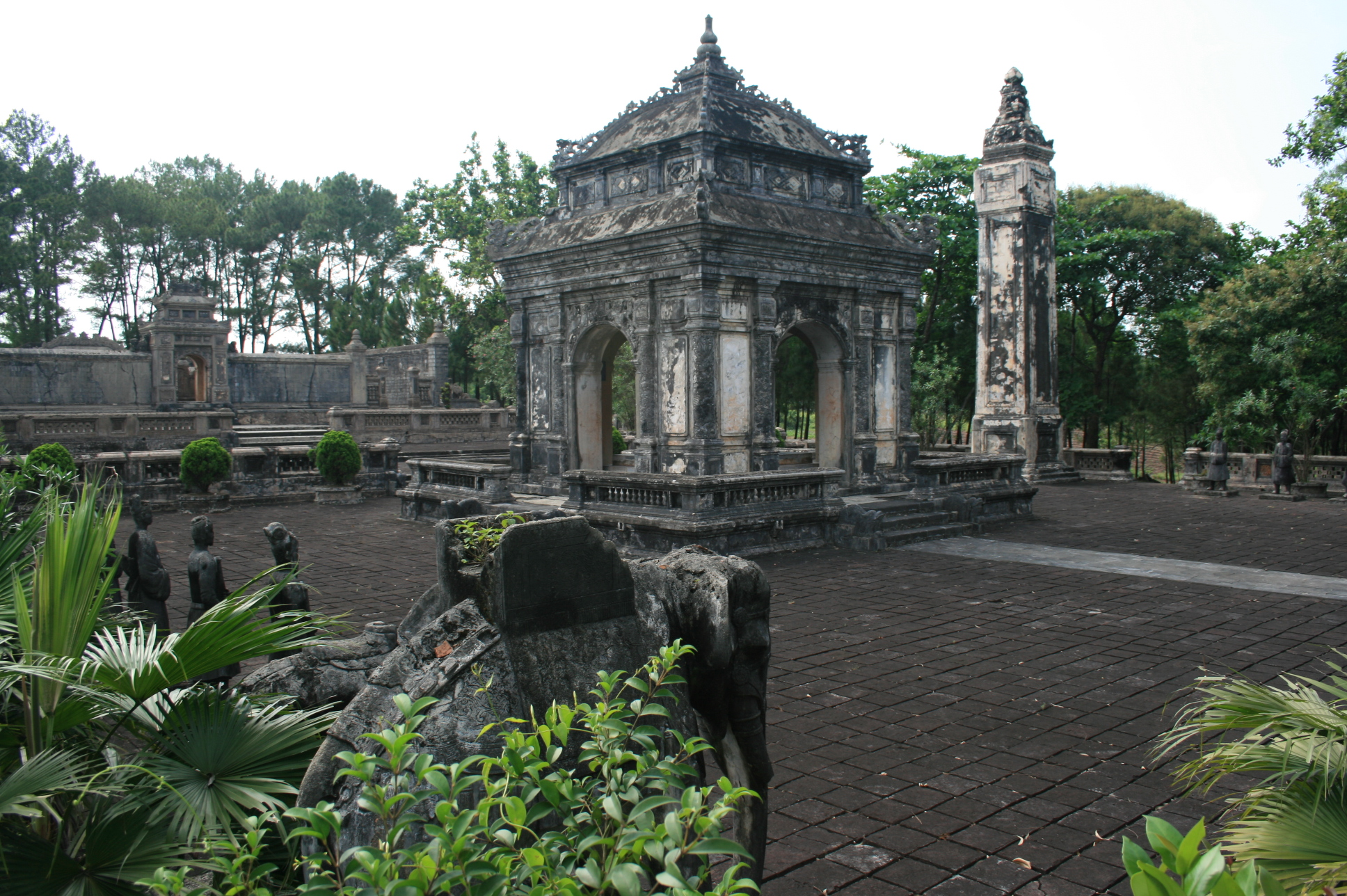
Stele house in mausoleum of Đồng Khánh

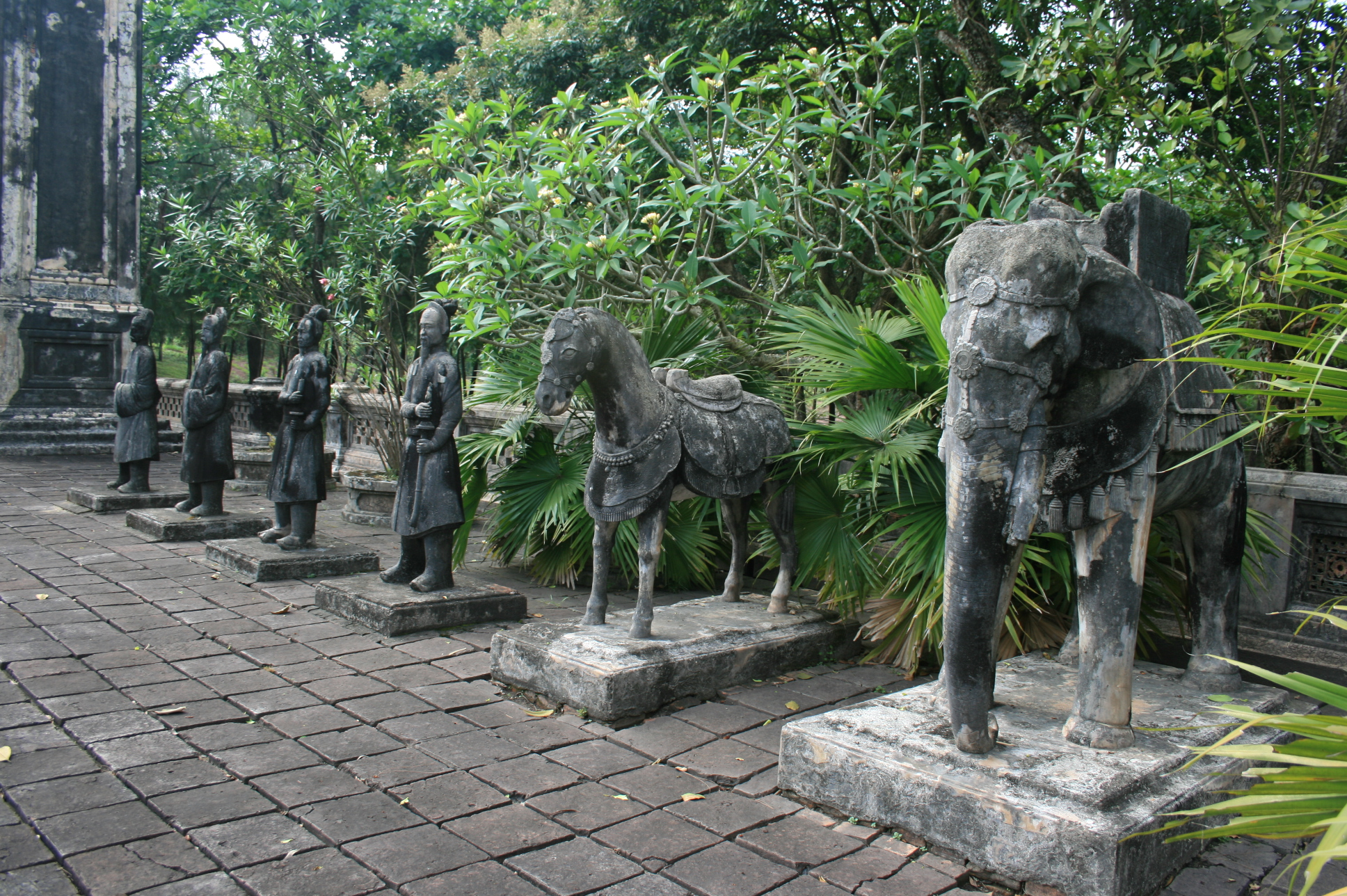
Statues of mandarins and elephants

In 1916, his son the Emperor Khải Định granted him the name Phối Thiên Minh Vận Hiếu Đức Nhân Vũ Vĩ Công Hoằng Liệt Thông Thiết Mẫn Huệ Thuần Hoàng Đế (配天明運孝德仁武偉功弘烈聰哲敏惠純皇帝). He was buried in Tư Lăng mausoleum (思陵), which is located at Dương Xuân Thượng village, Hương Thuỷ commune, Thừa Thiên Province.

== Gallery ==
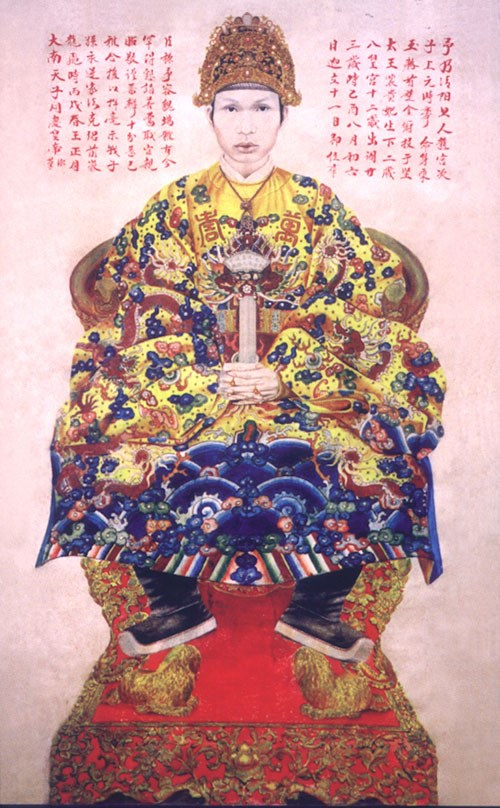
Posthumous portrait of Emperor Đồng Khánh

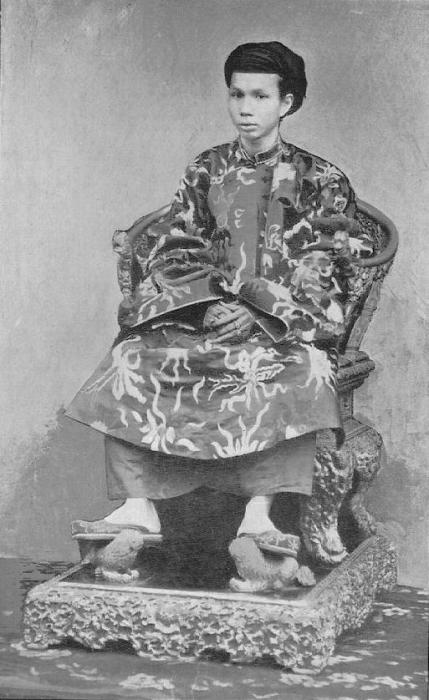
Emperor Đồng Khánh on his throne

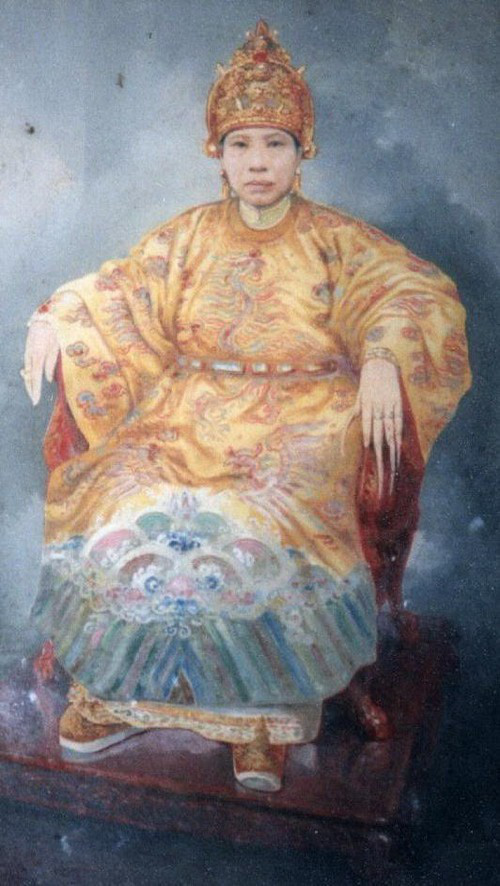
Empress consort Hựu Thiên, wife of Đồng Khánh

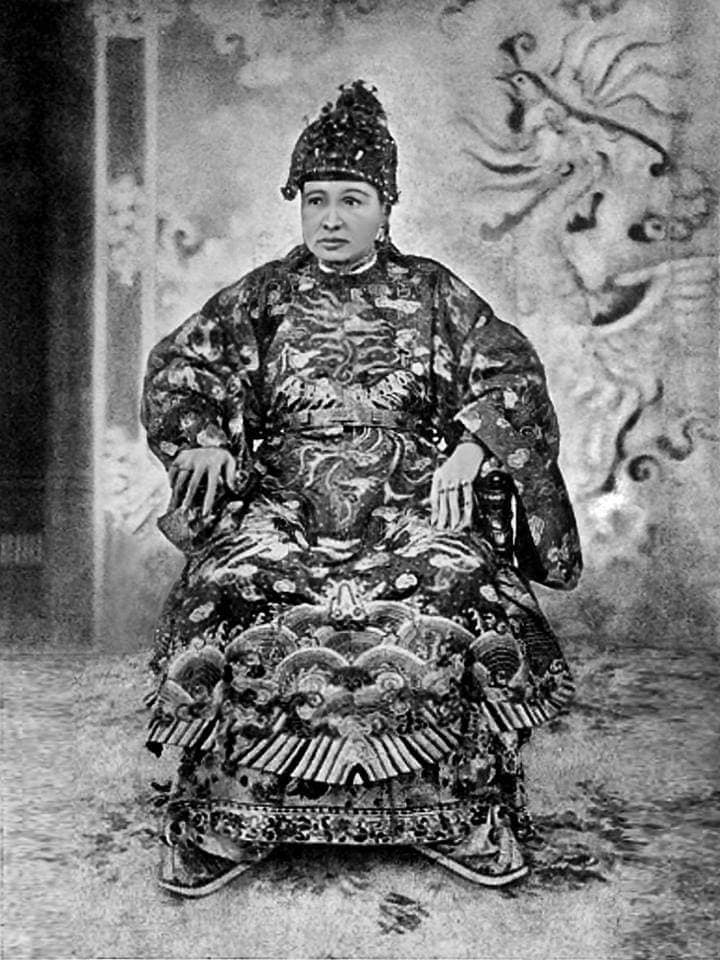
Empress consort Phụ Thiên, wife of Đồng Khánh

Đồng Khánh Nguyễn dynasty Born: 19 February 1864 Died: 28 January 1889
Regnal titles
Preceded by Hàm Nghi	Emperor of Vietnam; 1885–1889	Succeeded by Thành Thái
