= Claude Vinh-San =

French jazz musician (1934–2016)

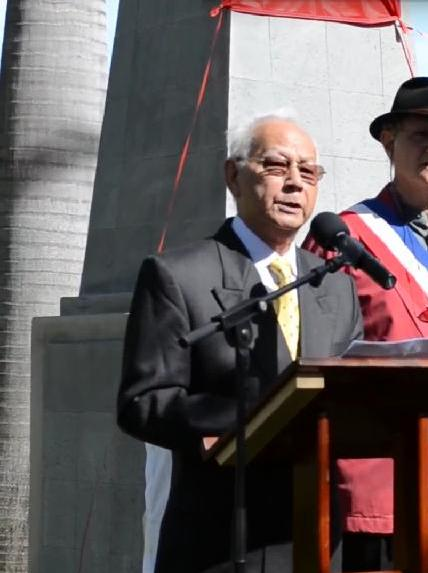
- Born: April 8, 1934; Saint-Denis, Réunion Island
- Died: July 13, 2016 (aged 82); Saint-Denis, Réunion Island
- Spouse: Jessy Tarby
- Issue: Yves Vinh-San; Patrick Vinh-San; Johnny Vinh-San; Jerry Vinh-San; Thierry Vinh-San; Cyril Vinh-San; Didier Vinh-San; Marie-Claude Vinh-San; Marilyn Vinh-San; Doris Vinh-San
- Father: Emperor Duy Tân
- Mother: Fermande Antier

Yves Claude Vinh-San, also Prince Nguyen Phuc Bảo Vàng (April 8, 1934 – July 13, 2016), was a French jazz musician and a son of Vietnamese Emperor Duy Tân and Fernande Antier, a French-born woman who was Duy Tan's third wife. He published a jazz album entitled Claude Vinh San et le jazz tropical. He was born in Saint-Denis, Réunion Island.

== Reburial of Duy Tan ==
In 1987, Vinh-San escorted the remains of his father Emperor Duy Tân with other members of the royal family to Vietnam in a traditional ceremony to rest in the tomb of his grandfather, Emperor Dục Đức.

== Author ==
Vinh-San wrote two books, Duy Tân, Empereur d'Annam 1900-1945 (2001) and Hommage au prince Vinh San et à l'Empereur Duy Tan : au commandement de Forces françaises libres (2012).
