= Duy Tân =

Emperor of Đại Nam under French protectorate of Annam and Tonkin (1900–1945)

Emperor Duy Tân 維新帝
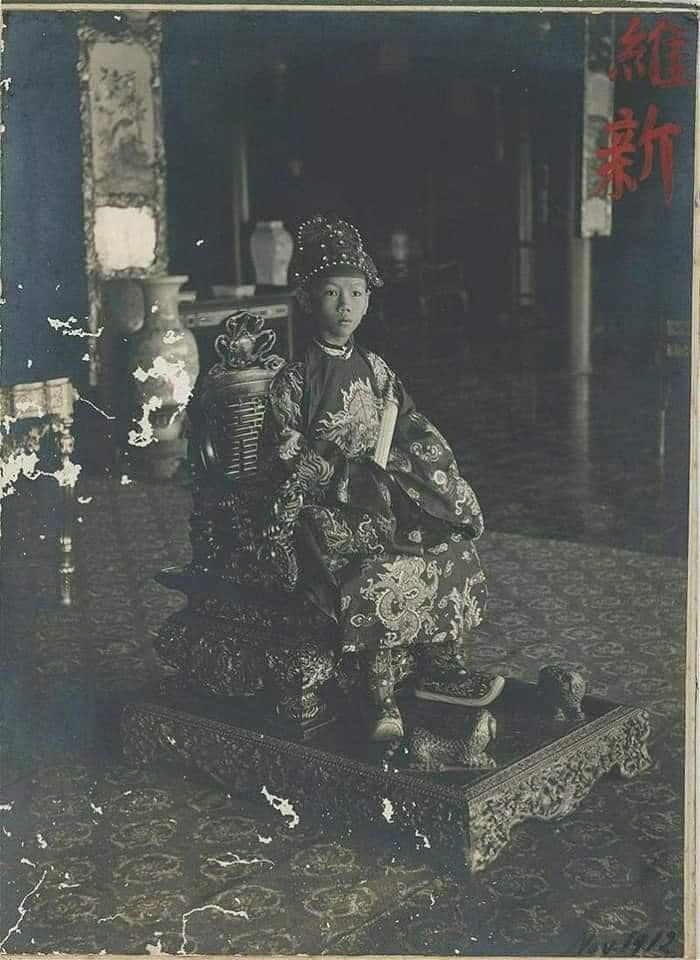
- The Emperor on throne and holding hốt in Cần Chánh Điện (勤政殿)

Emperor of Đại Nam under French protectorate of Annam and Tonkin
- Reign: 5 September 1907 – 6 May 1916
- Predecessor: Thành Thái
- Successor: Khải Định

Emperor of the Nguyễn dynasty
- Reign: 5 September 1907 – 6 May 1916
- Predecessor: Thành Thái
- Successor: Khải Định
- Born: 19 September 1900; Imperial City of Huế, French Indochina
- Died: 26 December 1945 (aged 45); Lobaye, Ubangi-Shari, French Equatorial Africa
- Burial: An Lăng
- Spouse: Imperial Noble Consort Mai Thị Vàng; Marie Anne Viale; Fermande Antier; Ernestine Yvette Maillot
- Issue: Armand Viale; Thérèse Vĩnh San; Rita Suzy Georgette Vĩnh San; Guy Georges Vĩnh San; Yves Claude Vĩnh San; Joseph Roger Vĩnh San
Names
- Nguyễn Phúc Vĩnh San (阮福永珊); Nguyễn Phúc Hoàng (阮福晃)
Era name and dates
- Duy Tân (維新): 1907–1916
- House: Nguyễn Phúc
- Father: Thành Thái
- Mother: Concubine Nguyễn Thị Định
- Religion: Buddhism
- Standard

Emperor Duy Tân (Hanoi: [zwi˧ tən˧], chữ Hán: 維新, lit. "renovation"; 19 September 1900 – 26 December 1945), born Nguyễn Phúc Vĩnh San, was the 11th emperor of the Nguyễn dynasty in Vietnam, who reigned for nine years between 1907 and 1916.

== Early childhood ==
Duy Tân (at the time, known by his birth name, Prince Nguyễn Phúc Vĩnh San) was son of the Thành Thái emperor. Because of his opposition to French rule and his erratic, depraved actions (which some speculate were feigned to shield his opposition from the French) Thành Thái was declared insane and exiled to Vũng Tàu in 1907. The French decided to pass the throne to his son Nguyễn Phúc Vĩnh San, despite the fact that he was only seven years old. The French hoped that someone so young would be easily influenced and controlled, and thus raised to be pro-French.

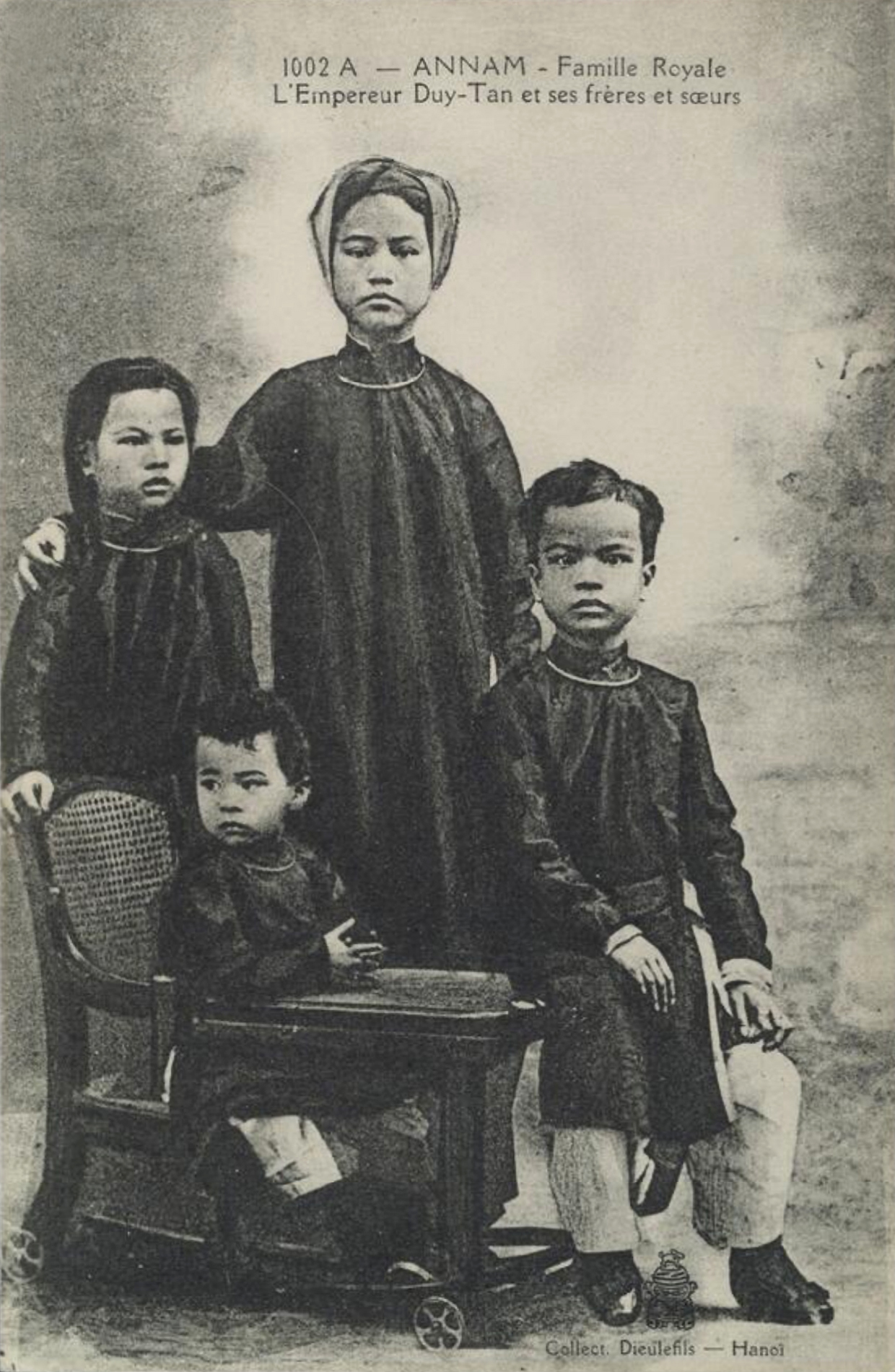
Young prince Vinh San (right)

== Reign, 1906–1916 ==
The efforts on the part of the French to raise the prince to support them largely failed. Nguyễn Phúc Vĩnh San was enthroned with the reign name of Duy Tân, meaning "friend of reform", but in time he proved incapable of living up to this name. As he became older he noticed that, even though he was treated as the emperor, it was the colonial authorities who were actually obeyed. As he became a teenager, Emperor Duy Tân came under the influence of the mandarin Trần Cao Vân, who was very much opposed to the colonial administration. Emperor Duy Tân began to plan a secret rebellion with Trần Cao Vân and others to overthrow the French.

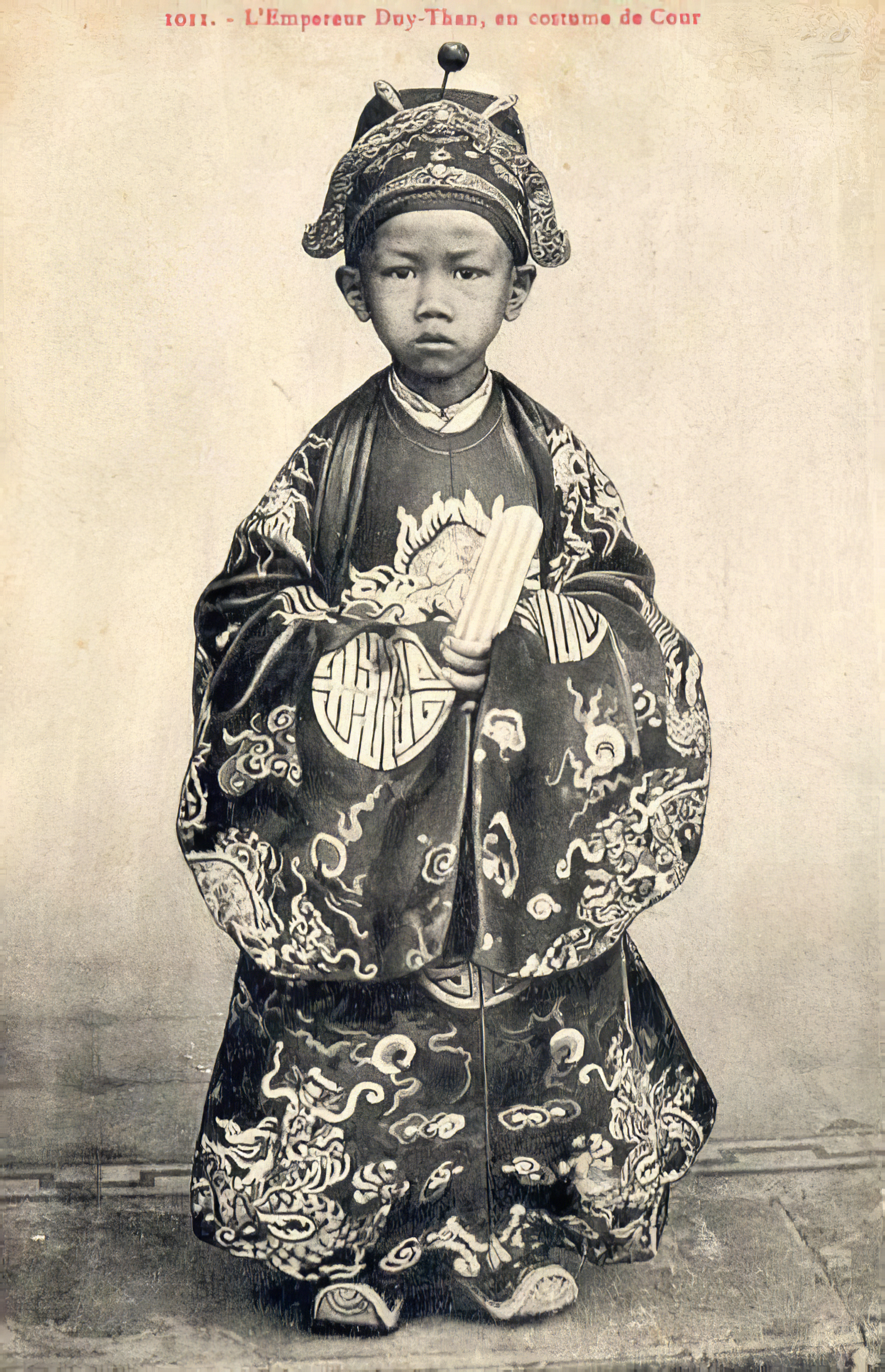
Young emperor

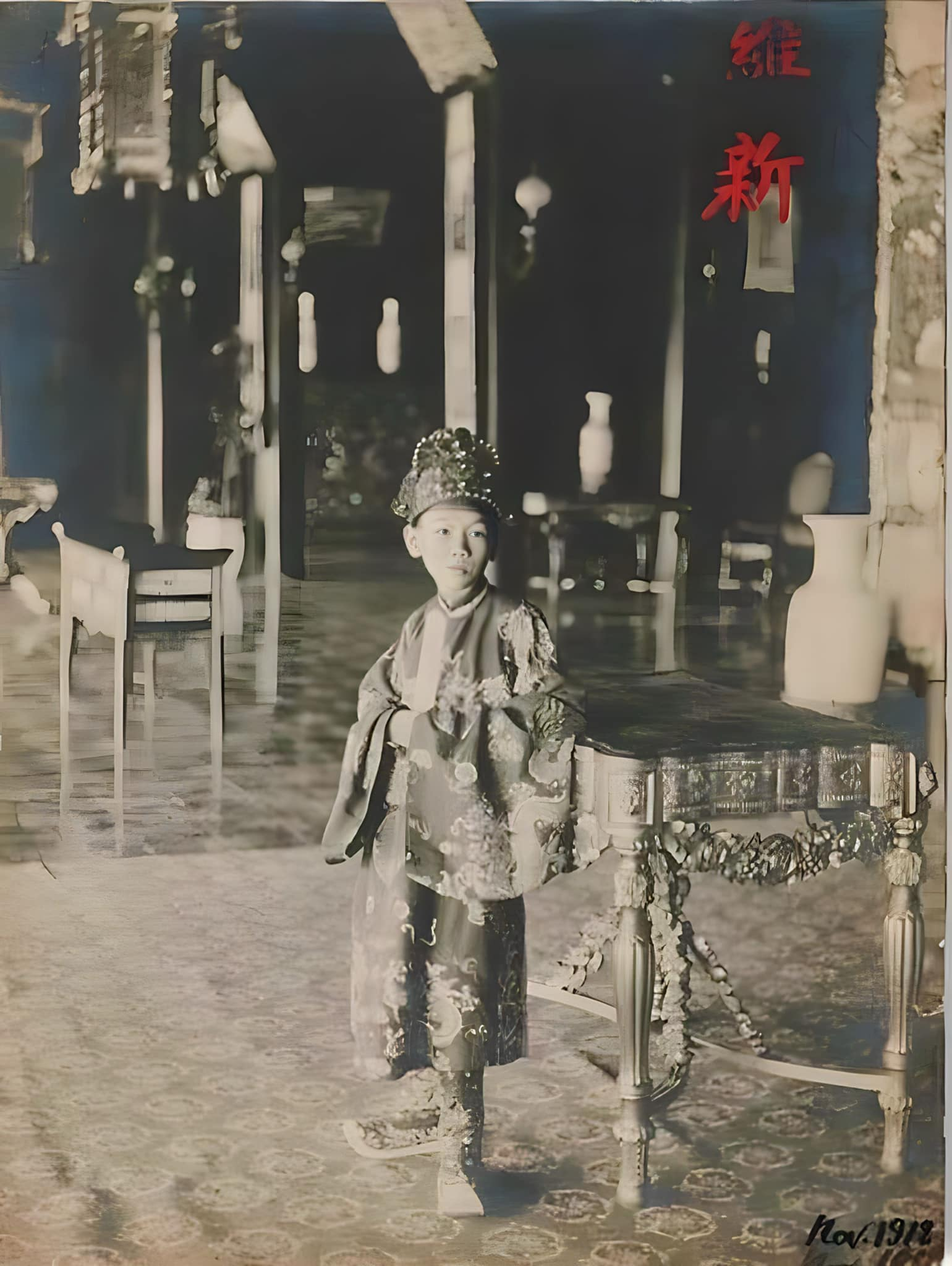
Emperor Duy Tân in Cần Chánh Điện (勤政殿) in 11/1912

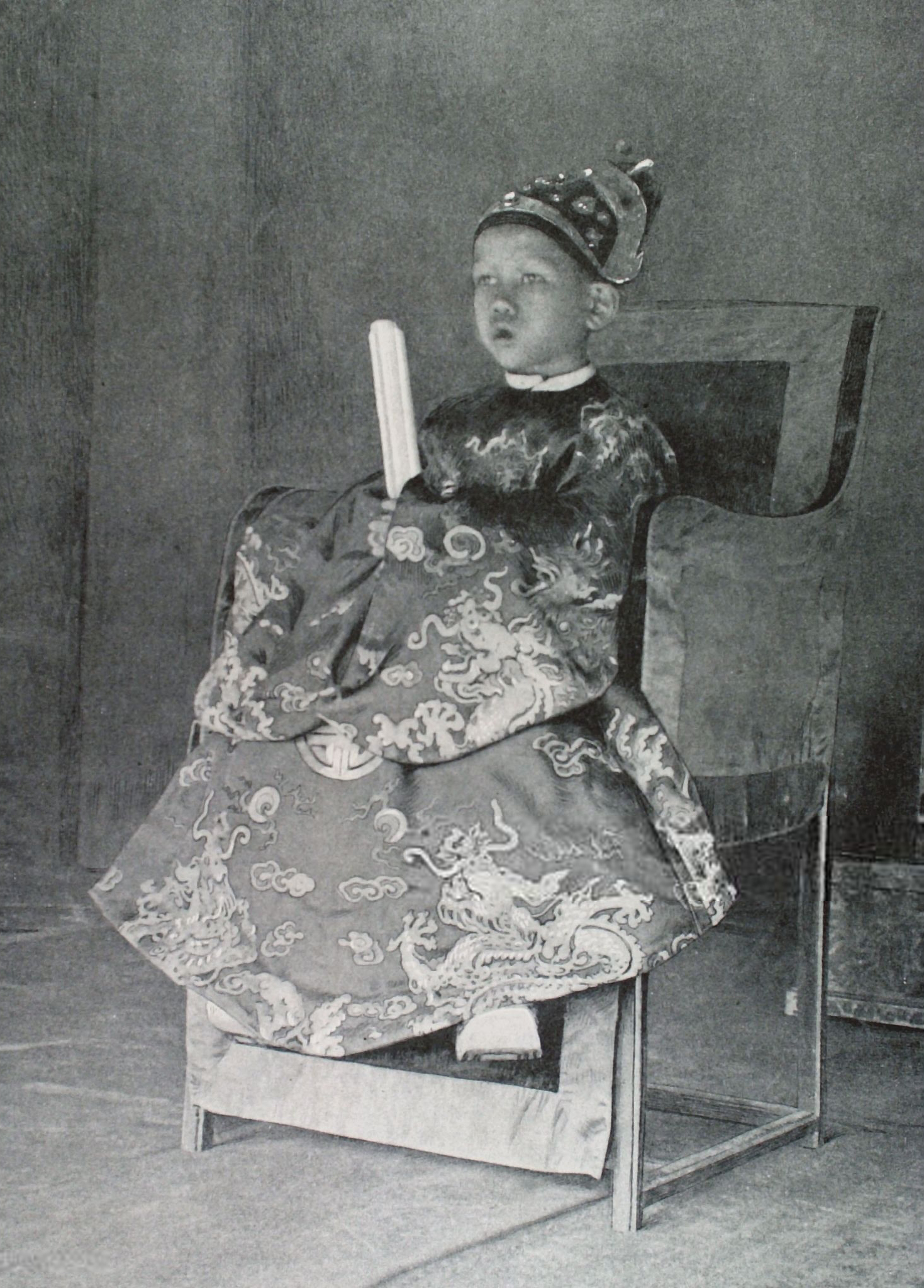
Young emperor at 7, 1907

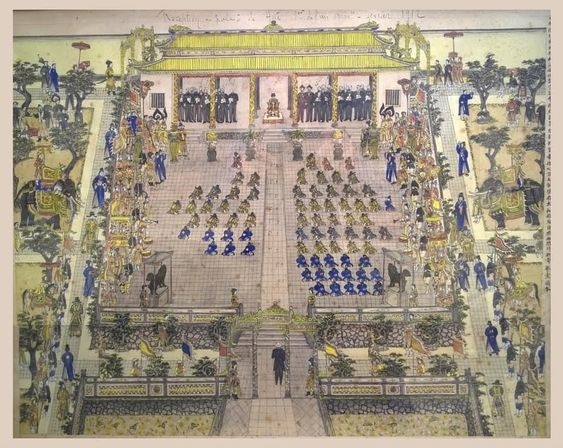
Welcome ceremony of French diplomats by Emperor Duy Tân at Thái Hòa Điện (太和殿), 1912

In 1916, while France was preoccupied with fighting World War I, Emperor Duy Tân was smuggled out of the Forbidden City with Trần Cao Vân to call upon the people to rise up against the French. However, the secret was revealed, and France immediately sent troops there, and after only a few days, they were betrayed and captured by the French authorities. Because of his age and to avoid a worse situation, Emperor Duy Tân was deposed and exiled instead of being killed. Trần Cao Vân and the rest of the revolutionaries were all beheaded.

== Life in exile ==
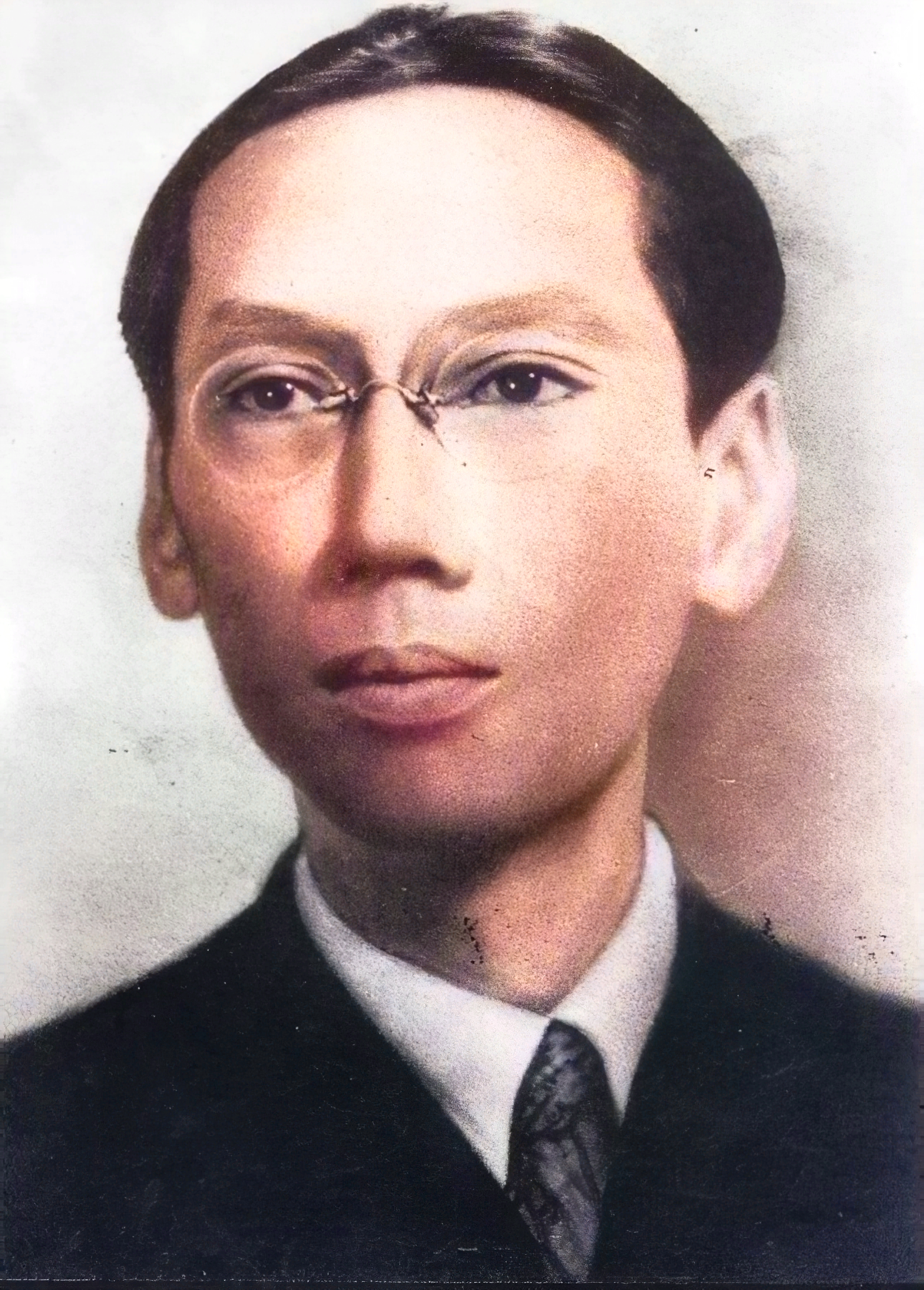
Duy Tân in 1930

The former emperor was exiled with his father (Thành Thái) to Réunion Island in the Indian Ocean. Prince Vĩnh San continued to favor national liberation for Vietnam in exile.

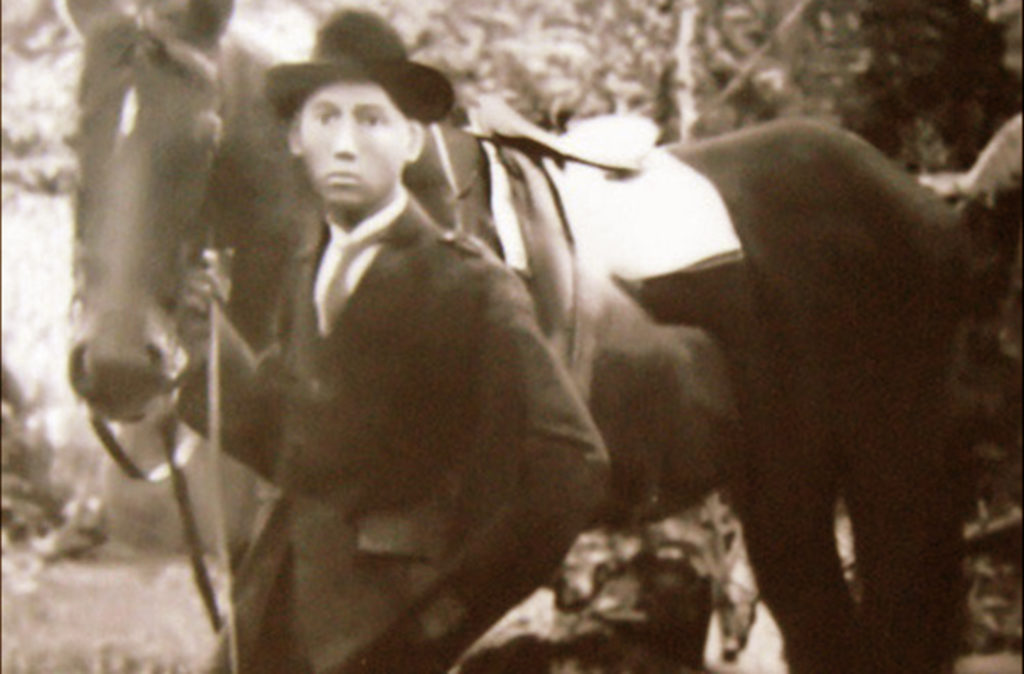
The former Emperor Duy Tân, pictured with a race horse in Réunion

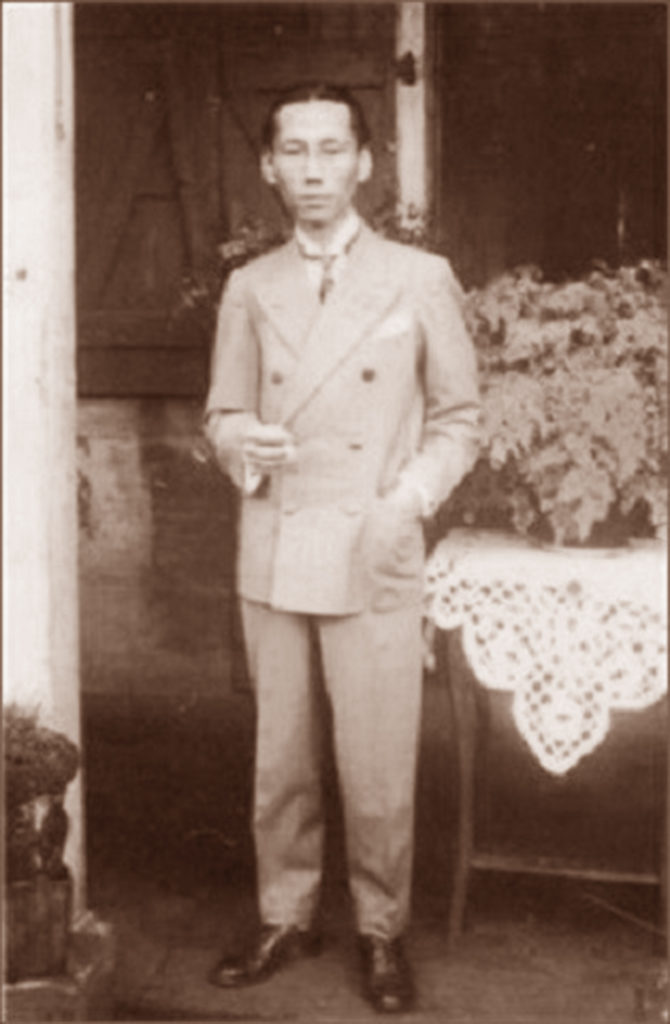
The former Emperor Duy Tân, pictured at his house in St-Denis, Réunion

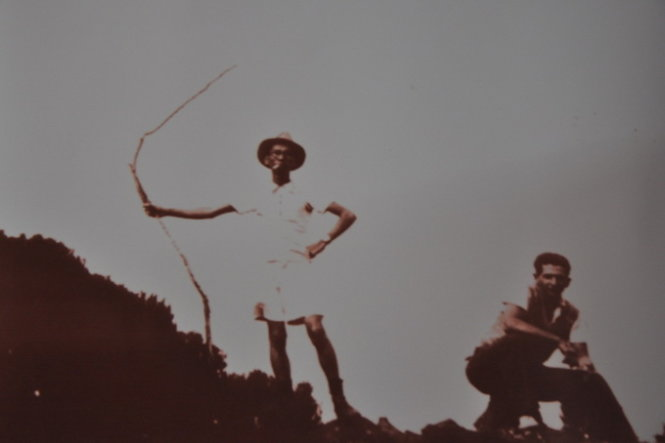
Former emperor in Réunion

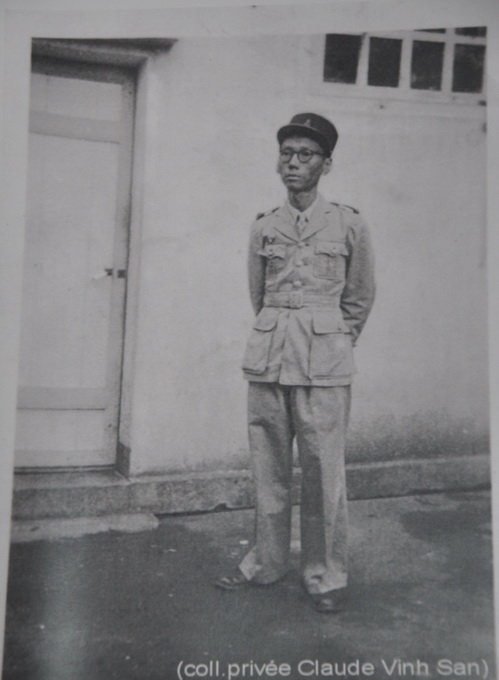
Former emperor in exile (Réunion)

=== World War II service and death ===
During World War II he resisted the Vichy Regime until the Liberation of La Réunion, after which he joined the Free French Forces and became a low-ranking naval officer on the French destroyer Léopard, serving as radio officer. He then joined the Free French army as a second lieutenant in December 1942, receiving successive promotions to lieutenant (1943), captain (1944), major (July 1945) and lieutenant-colonel (September 1945).

In late 1945, France reasserted control over French Indochina and sought a political alternative to the communist Viet Minh, following the abdication of Emperor Bảo Đại. French leader Charles de Gaulle talked to Prince Vĩnh San, who was still very popular in the Vietnamese public memory for his patriotism, about returning to Vietnam as Emperor. However, the former Emperor died in a plane crash in Central Africa on his way home to Vietnam in 1945 and the great hopes of many died with him – as a patriotic challenge to Hồ Chí Minh. For his wartime service, the French posthumously awarded him the Grand Cross of the Legion of Honour and the Officer's Médaille de la Résistance, also appointing him a Companion of the Ordre de la Libération.

== Reburial in Vietnam ==
In 1987, his son, Prince Bảo Vàng, and the royal family of Vietnam accompanied his father's remains, which were removed from Africa and brought home to Vietnam in a traditional ceremony to rest in the tomb of his grandfather, Emperor Dục Đức. In 2001, Prince Bảo Vang wrote a book titled Duy Tân, Empereur d'Annam 1900–1945 about his father's life. Most cities in Vietnam have named major streets after him.

== Family ==
- 1st wife: Mai Thị Vàng (1899–1980)
- 2nd wife: Marie Anne Viale (b. 1890)
  - Armand Viale (b. 1919)
- 3rd wife: Fernande Antier (b. 1913)
  - Thérèse (1928–1928)
  - Rita Suzy Georgette Vinh-San (1929–2020)
  - Solange (1930–1930)
  - Guy Georges Vinh-San (b. 1933)
  - Yves Claude Vinh-San (b. 1934 - d. 2016)
  - Joseph Roger Vinh-San (b. 1938)
  - Ginette (1940–1940)
- 4th wife: Ernestine Yvette Maillot (b. 1924)
  - Andrée Maillot Vinh-San (1945–2011)

== Images ==
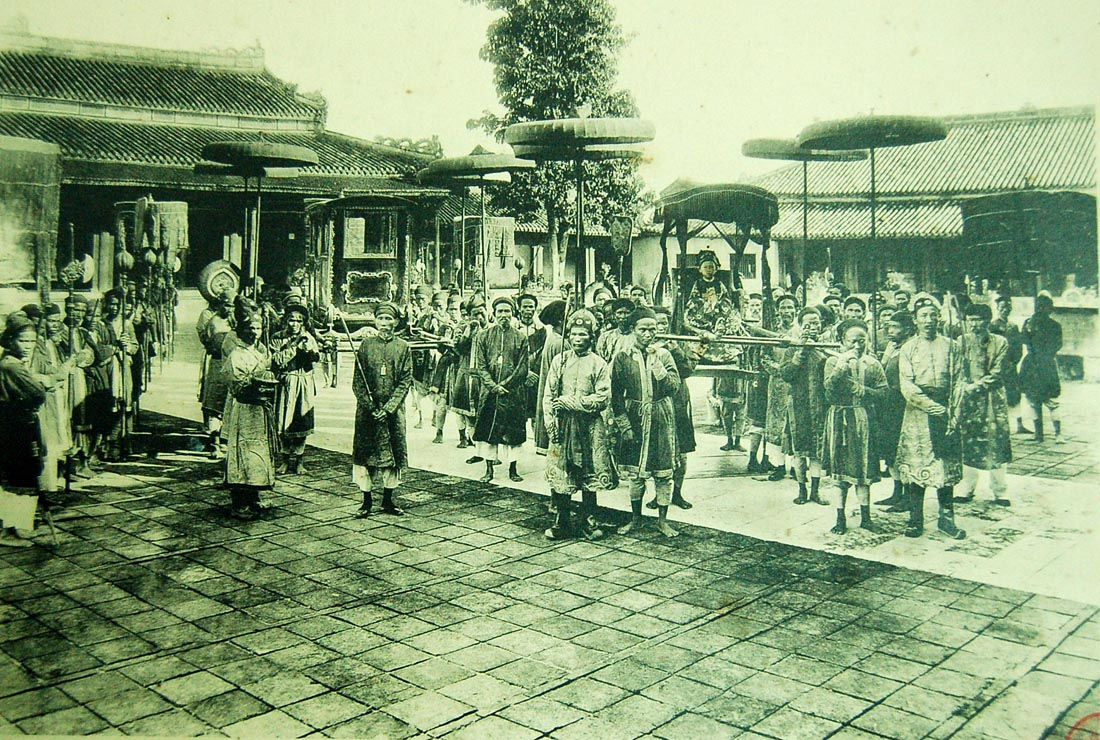
Duy Tân at his coronation in 1907

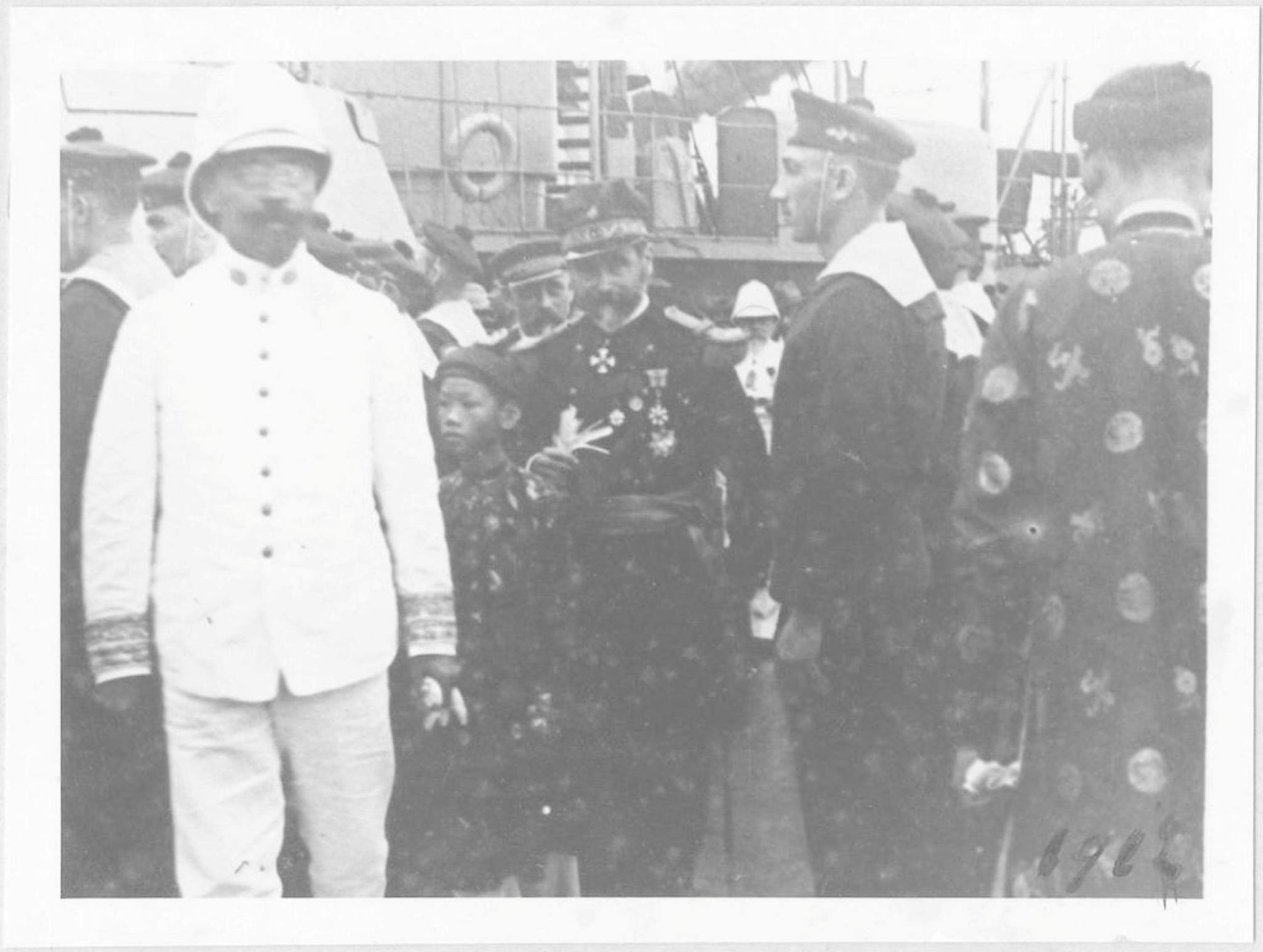
Young emperor (middle) and French colonial officers

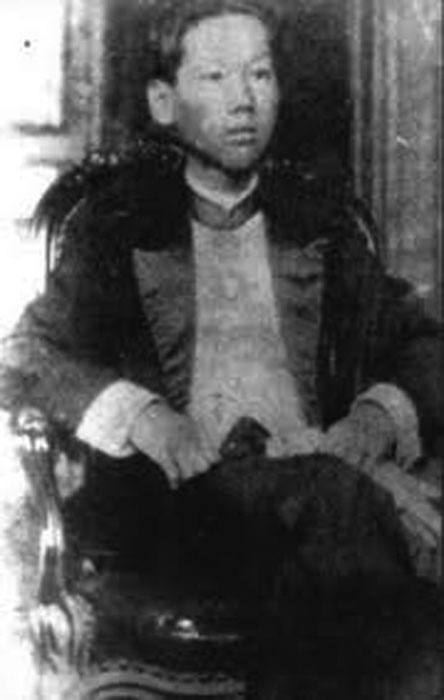
Emperor at 16, 1916

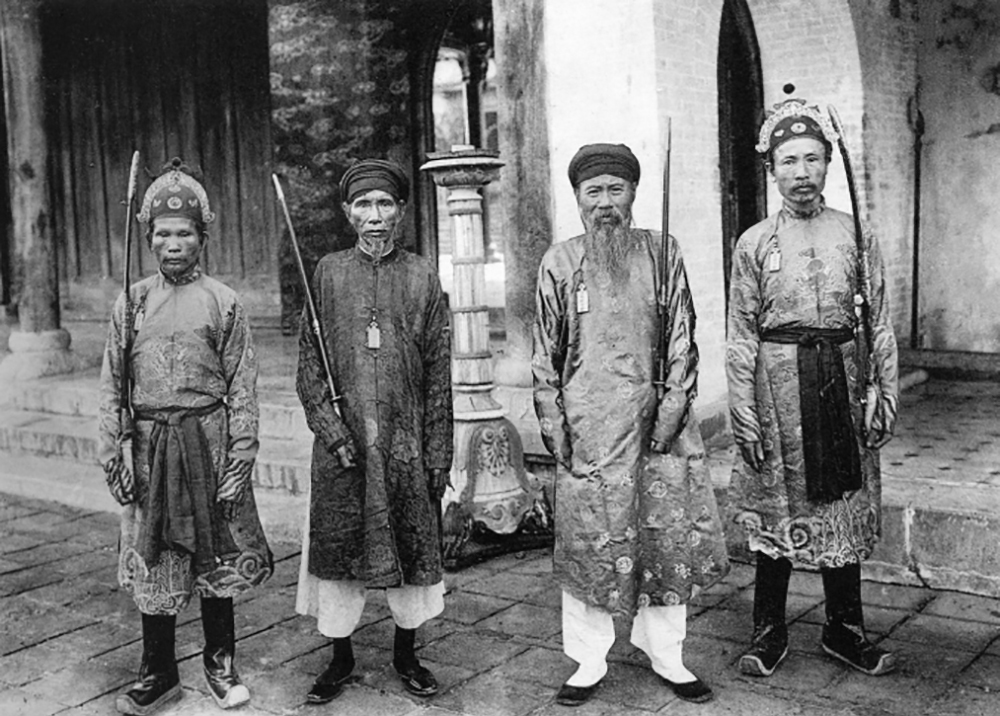
Royal guards in Imperial palace, Duy Tan era

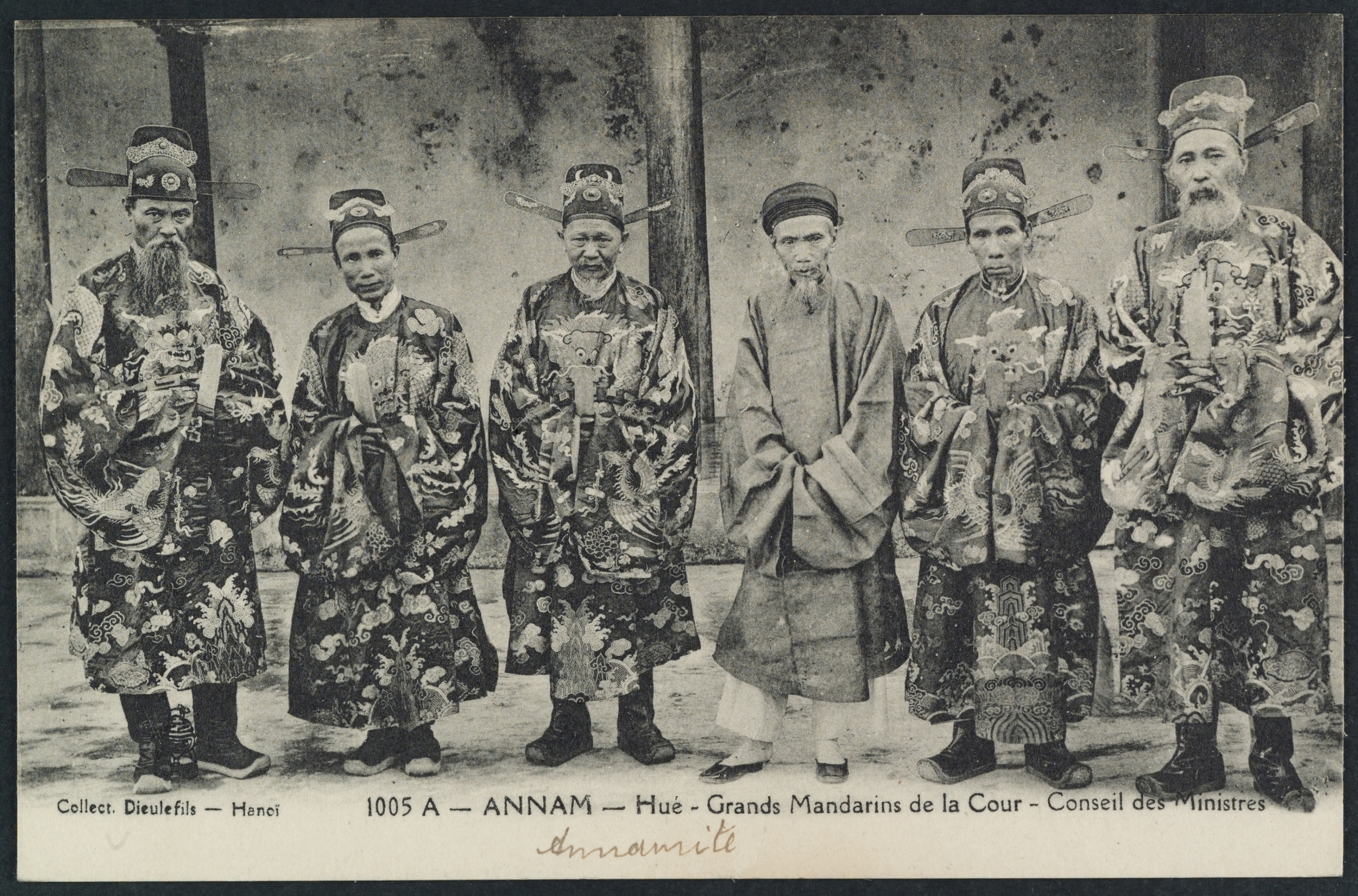
Cabinet ministry of emperor Duy Tan, (From left to right), Minister of laws (Tôn Thất Hân), Minister of administration (Nguyễn Hữu Bài), Minister of rites (Huỳnh Côn), prince Nguyễn Phúc Miên Lịch, Minister of Public Works (Lê Trinh), Minister of Education (Cao Xuân Dục)

Duy Tân Nguyễn dynasty Born: 1899 Died: 1945
Regnal titles
Preceded by Thành Thái	Emperor of Vietnam; 1907–16	Succeeded by Khải Định
