= Tomb of Dục Đức =

Royal tomb of the Nguyễn Dynasty in Vietnam

Coordinates: 16°27′04″N 107°35′35″E

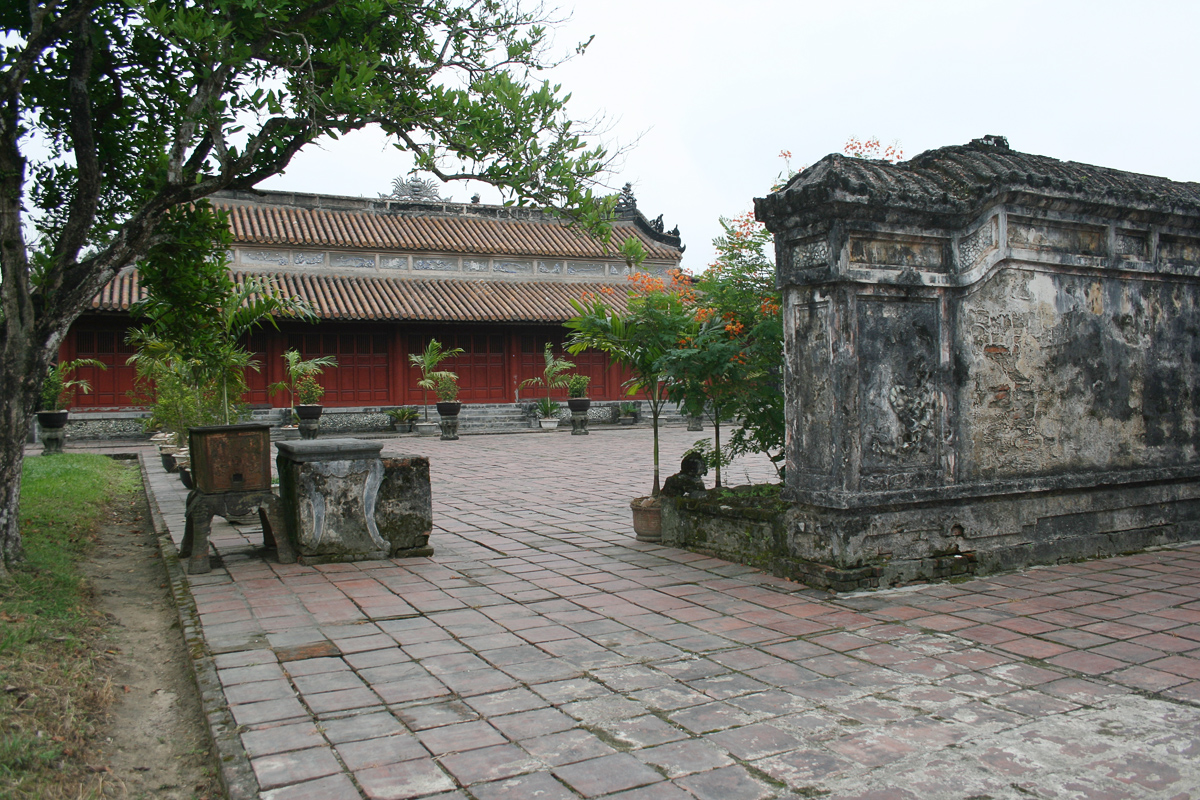
- Main gate to the tomb

General information
- Architectural style: Mausoleum
- Location: The Complex of Huế Monuments, Huế City
- Country: Vietnam
- Completed: 1889

Design and construction
- Main contractor: emperor Thành Thái

The Tomb of Emperor Dục Đức (Vietnamese: Lăng Dục Đức), officially the An Mausoleum (An Lăng, chữ Hán: 安陵) is a tomb complex in Huế, Vietnam, in which are buried Dục Đức and his wife, his son Thành Thái, his grandson the child-emperor Duy Tân, and several other members of Vietnam's last dynasty, the Nguyễn dynasty, such as the queen mother Nguyễn Thị Định (mother of Duy Tân).

Duy Tân was buried in the tomb compound in 1987.

The mausoleum has two sections - the tomb itself and Long An shrine.
