= Thành Thái =

Emperor of Đại Nam under French protectorate of Annam and Tonkin (1879–1954)

Emperor Thành Thái 成泰帝
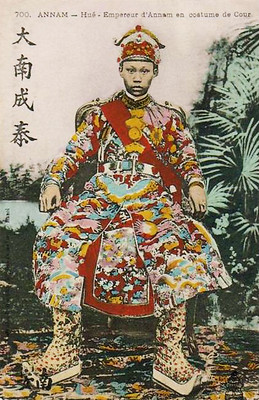
- Emperor Thanh Thai in military costume

Emperor of Đại Nam under French protectorate of Annam and Tonkin
- Reign: 2 February 1889 – 3 September 1907
- Predecessor: Đồng Khánh
- Successor: Duy Tân

Emperor of the Nguyễn dynasty
- Reign: 2 February 1889 – 3 September 1907
- Predecessor: Đồng Khánh
- Successor: Duy Tân
- Born: March 14, 1879; Imperial City, Huế, Đại Nam
- Died: March 20, 1954 (aged 75); Saigon, State of Vietnam
- Burial: An Lăng
- Spouse: 12 concubines
- Issue: 50 including 22 princes and 28 princesses prince Nguyễn Phúc Vĩnh San
Names
- Nguyễn Phúc Bửu Lân (阮福寶嶙); Nguyễn Phúc Chiêu (阮福昭)
Era name and dates
- Thành Thái (成泰): 1885–1889
Posthumous name
- Hoài Trạch Công (懷澤公)
Temple name
- none
- House: Nguyễn Phúc
- Father: Dục Đức
- Mother: Empress Dowager Từ Minh
- Religion: Ruism

Thành Thái (Hanoi: [tʰajŋ̟˨˩ tʰaːj˧˦], chữ Hán: 成泰; 14 March 1879 – 20 March 1954; born Nguyễn Phúc Bửu Lân; chữ Hán: 阮福寶嶙), was the son of Vietnamese Emperor Dục Đức and Empress Dowager Từ Minh. He reigned as emperor for 18 years, from 1889 to 1907. Thành Thái was one of the three "patriotic emperors" in Vietnamese history, along with Hàm Nghi and Duy Tân (his son), for their actions and views against French colonial rule in Vietnam.

== Biography ==
=== Early life ===
While the emperor Tự Đức was alive, Prince Quang Thái was placed under house arrest with his family for having connections with those who opposed him. When the emperor Đồng Khánh died, however, the French colonial authorities and the high-ranking mandarins decided that Quang Thái was the ideal successor and enthroned him as the new Vietnamese emperor, Emperor Thành Thái.

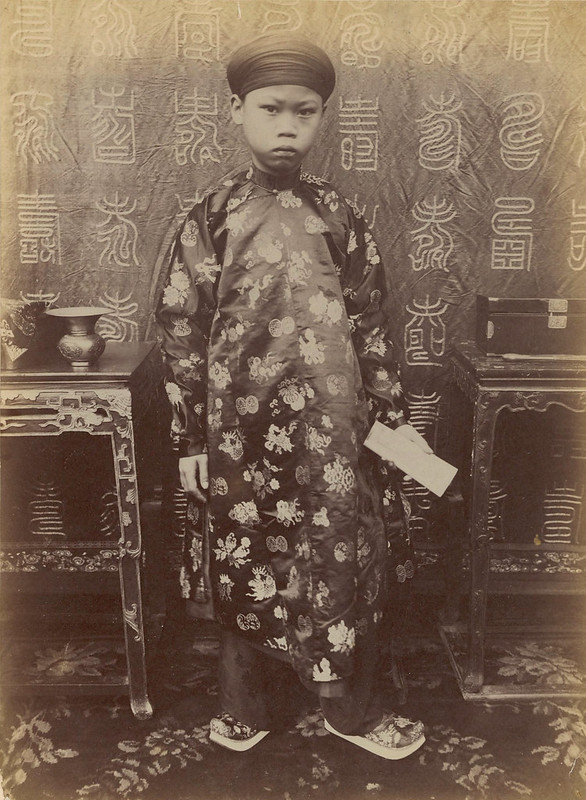
Young emperor Thanh Thai in 1892

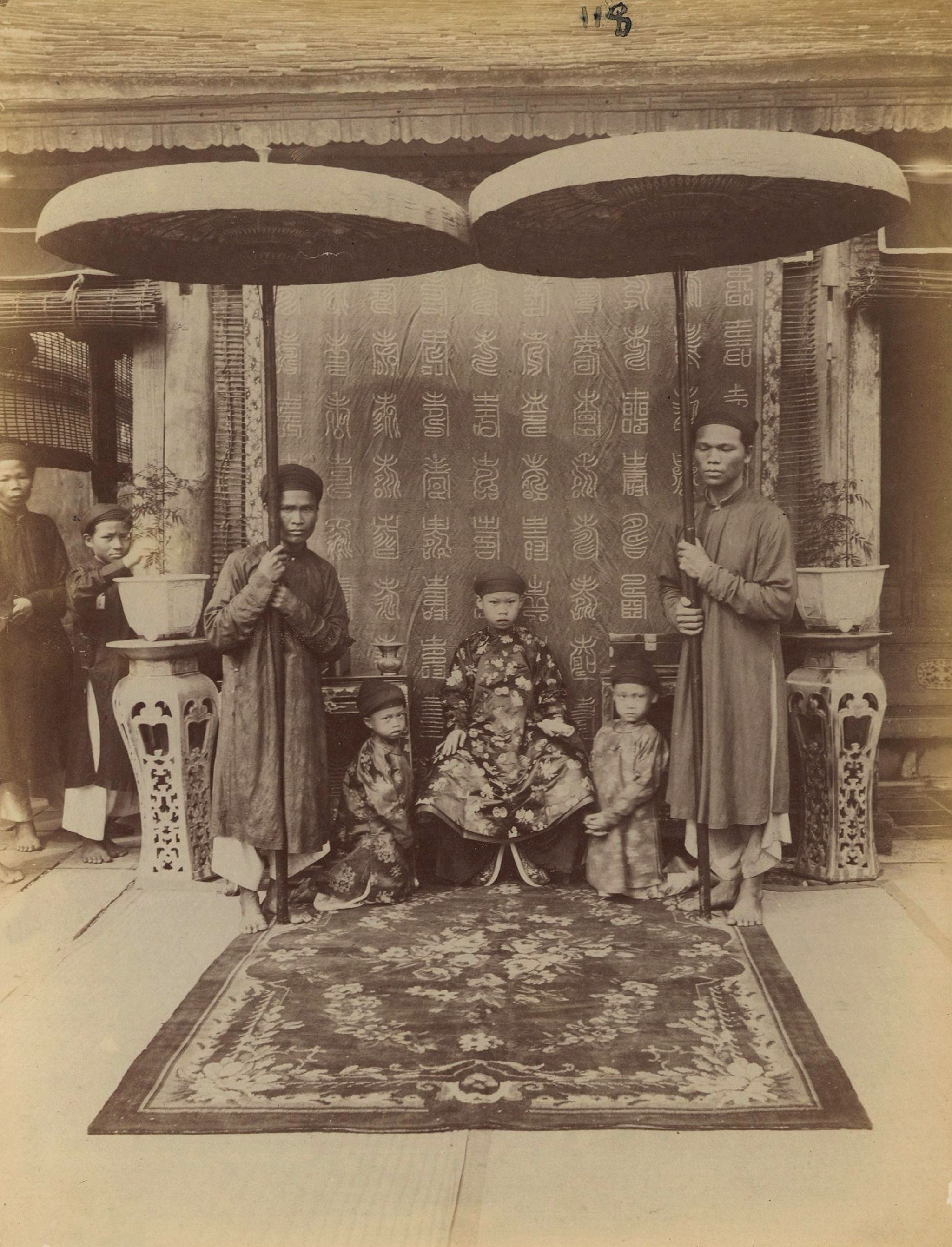
Coronation of Thành Thái

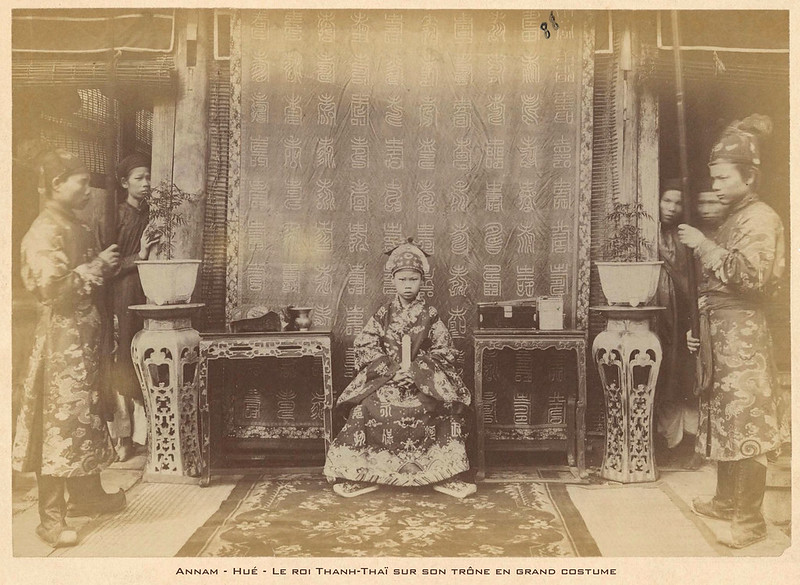
Young emperor Thanh Thai's enthronement

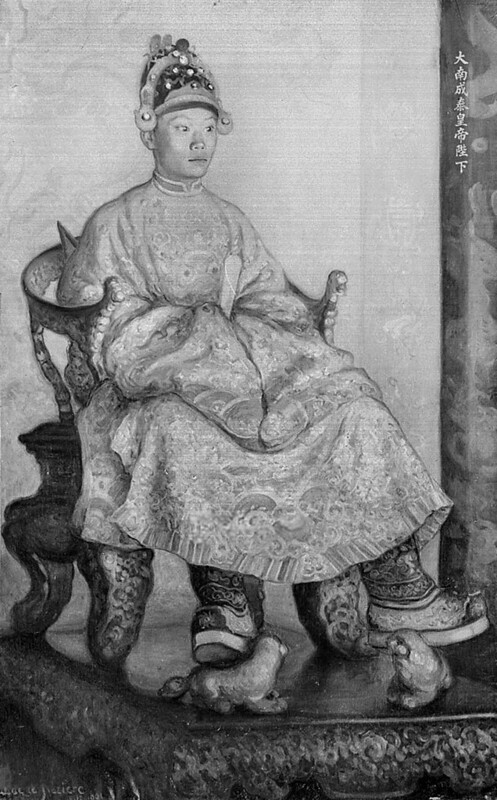
Young emperor Thanh Thai on throne in Thái Hòa Điện (太和殿)

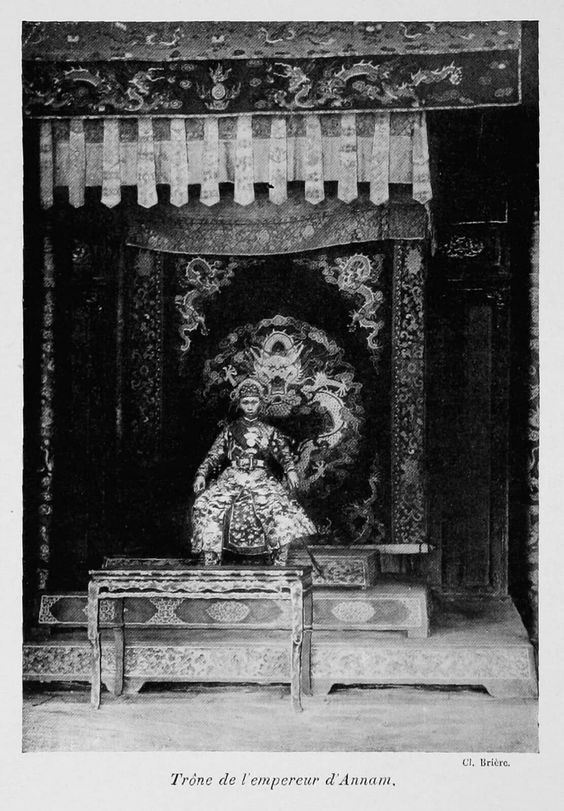
Thanh Thai on throne

At the age of 10, Thành Thái was recognized as being very intelligent and was already realizing that the French were keeping watch over him through palace spies. Whereas Đồng Khánh had tried to be friendly with the French, Emperor Thành Thái took a course of passive-resistance. Although he refrained from outright rebellion (which would have been political suicide), he made his feelings clear in other ways, symbolic gestures and biting remarks. He was also a man of the people, and a monarch who cared deeply for his country. The emperor would often slip out of the Forbidden City dressed in the clothes of a commoner to talk with his people directly and see how they were being affected by government policies.

=== Opposing French authority ===
To show that he was friendly with Western civilization, Thành Thái was the first Vietnamese monarch to cut his hair short in the French style and learn to drive a car. He encouraged French-style education, but maintained bitter feelings over their control of his country. He also supported numerous building projects and took an interest in the everyday lives of his subjects. When traveling among his people, he would hold impromptu "town hall meetings" where the Emperor sat on a mat with his subjects in a circle around him, discussing the issues of the day and hearing their point of view.

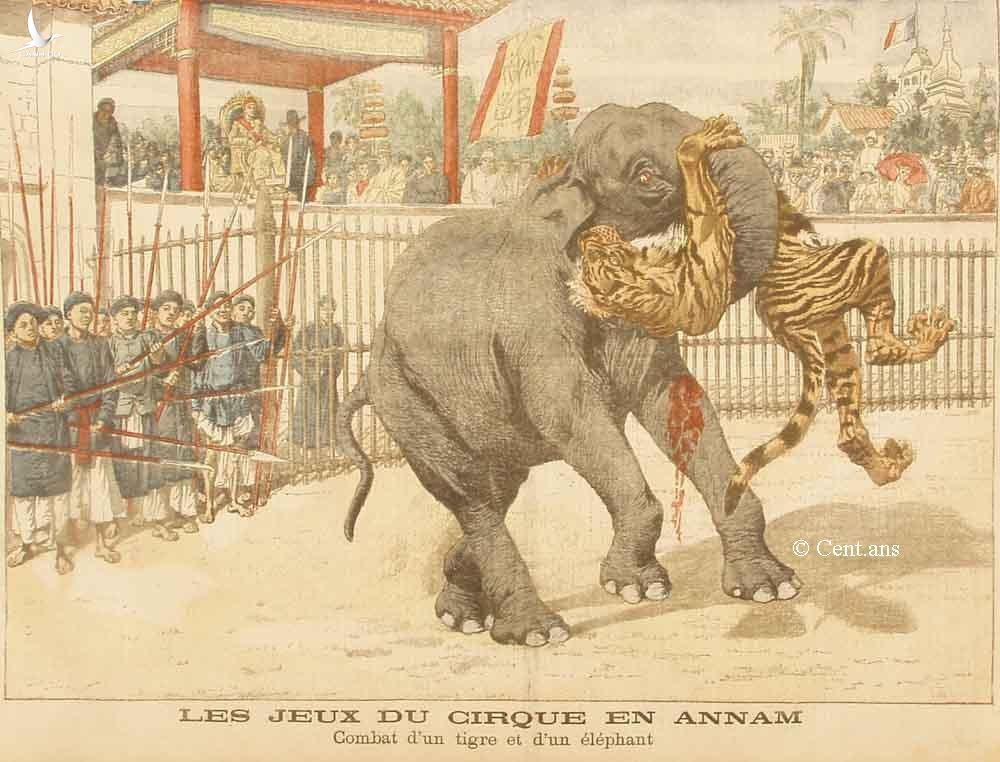
Thành Thái watching the battle between elephant and tiger, Le Petit Journal, 1904

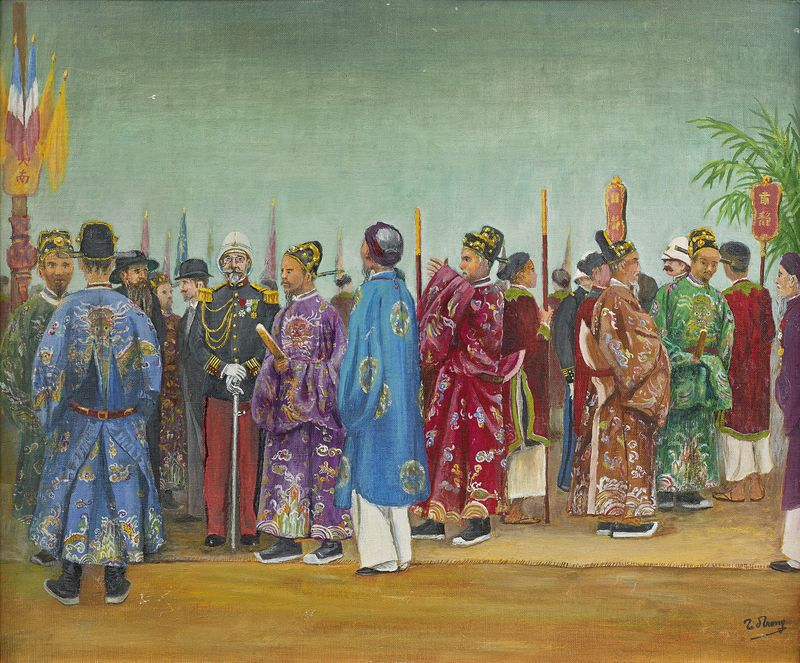
Oil painting "Les Mandarins et les Autorites Françaises Attendant L'Arrivee de l'Empereur Thanh Thai", 1903

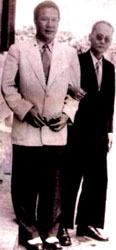
Former emperor Thành Thái (right) and former emperor Bảo Đại in Dalat, 1951

Slowly, as the emperor began to realize how thoroughly his palace had been infiltrated with French spies, he had to feign insanity to escape their constant scrutiny. With his enemies believing he was a harmless lunatic, Thành Thái was able to push more forcefully for Vietnamese autonomy while waiting for the right time to overthrow the French colonial rule. He was on his way to join a resistance movement in China when he was arrested by French forces who declared him insane and forced the Emperor to abdicate.

In 1907, his son was installed as Emperor Duy Tân. Thành Thái was exiled first to Vũng Tàu in South Vietnam and when Duy Tân rebelled against the French they were both exiled to Réunion Island in 1916.

Unlike Hàm Nghi, the lives of Thành Thái and Duy Tân were tough. They did not even have money to pay rent. In 1925, Emperor Khải Định knew his situation and sent 1,000 piastres to him. Khải Định later occasionally gave him money.

He never gave up hope for the liberation of his country. In May 1947, he was allowed to return home, but was kept under house arrest in Vũng Tàu. He died in Saigon on 24 March 1954 and was buried on the grounds of An Lang (Tomb of Duc Duc) in an old commune, Hương Thủy district, Thừa Thiên Huế Province, at the age of 75.

There are now roads in Vietnam named in his honour.

== Honours ==
- Grand Cross of the Legion of Honour of France – 1883
- Grand Cross of the Royal Order of Cambodia – 1889

== Cabinet ==
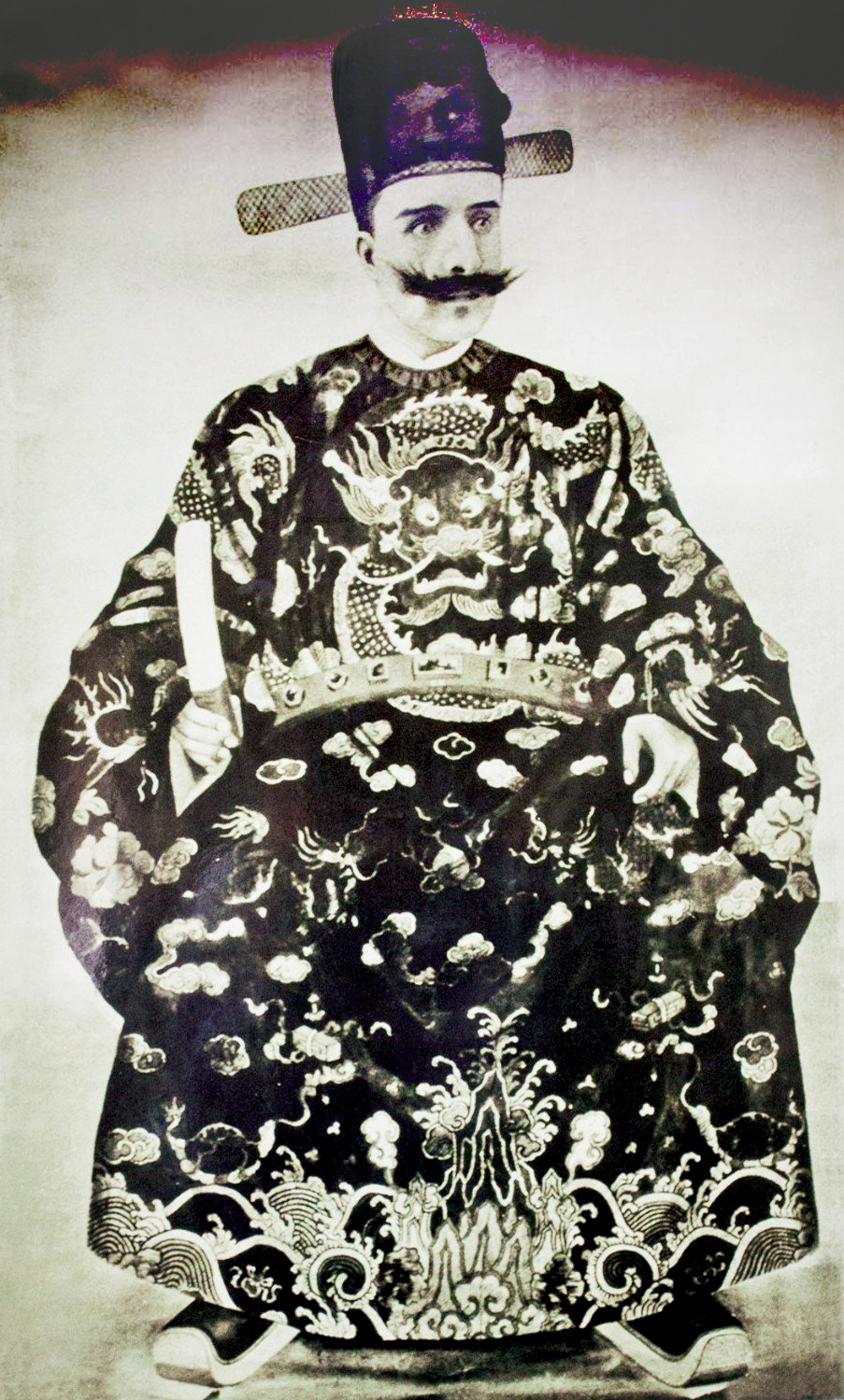
Auguste François, French consul who sponsored the construction of the rail line from Vietnam to Kunming

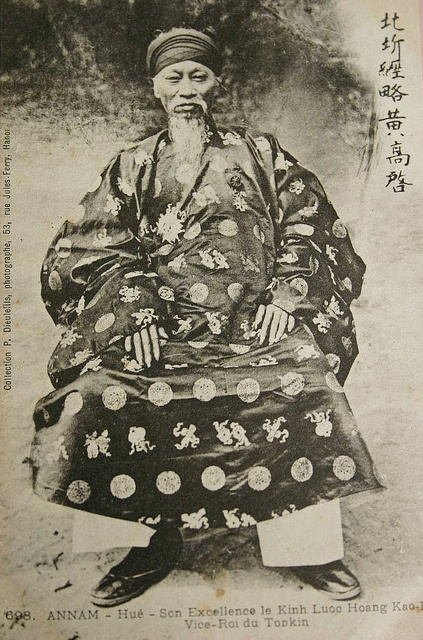
Hoàng Cao Khải, viceroy of Tonkin who was the spy of the French colonial regime and suppressed the anti-French revolution of Phan Đình Phùng and Cần Vương movement, Bãi Sậy uprising and Yên Thế Insurrection of Hoàng Hoa Thám

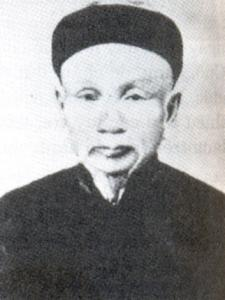
Nguyễn Thiện Thuật

Nguyễn Trọng Hợp

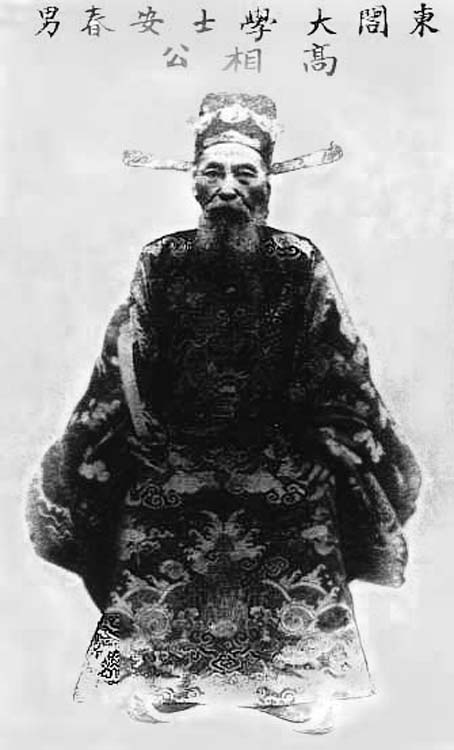
Cao Xuân Dục, one of the loyal officials of emperor Thành Thái

== Gallery ==
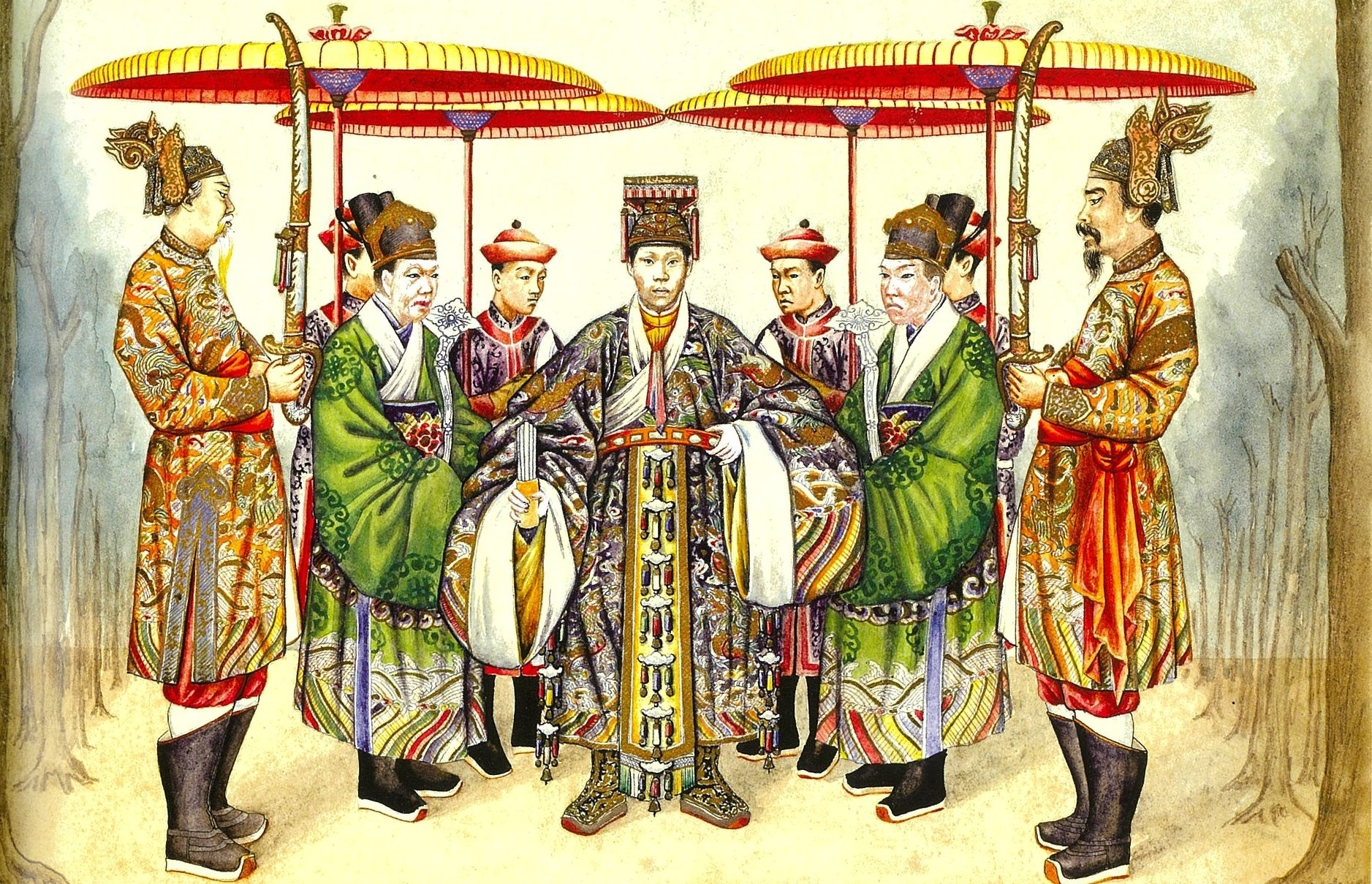
Emperor Thành Thái in Cổn Miện in Nam Giao ceremony

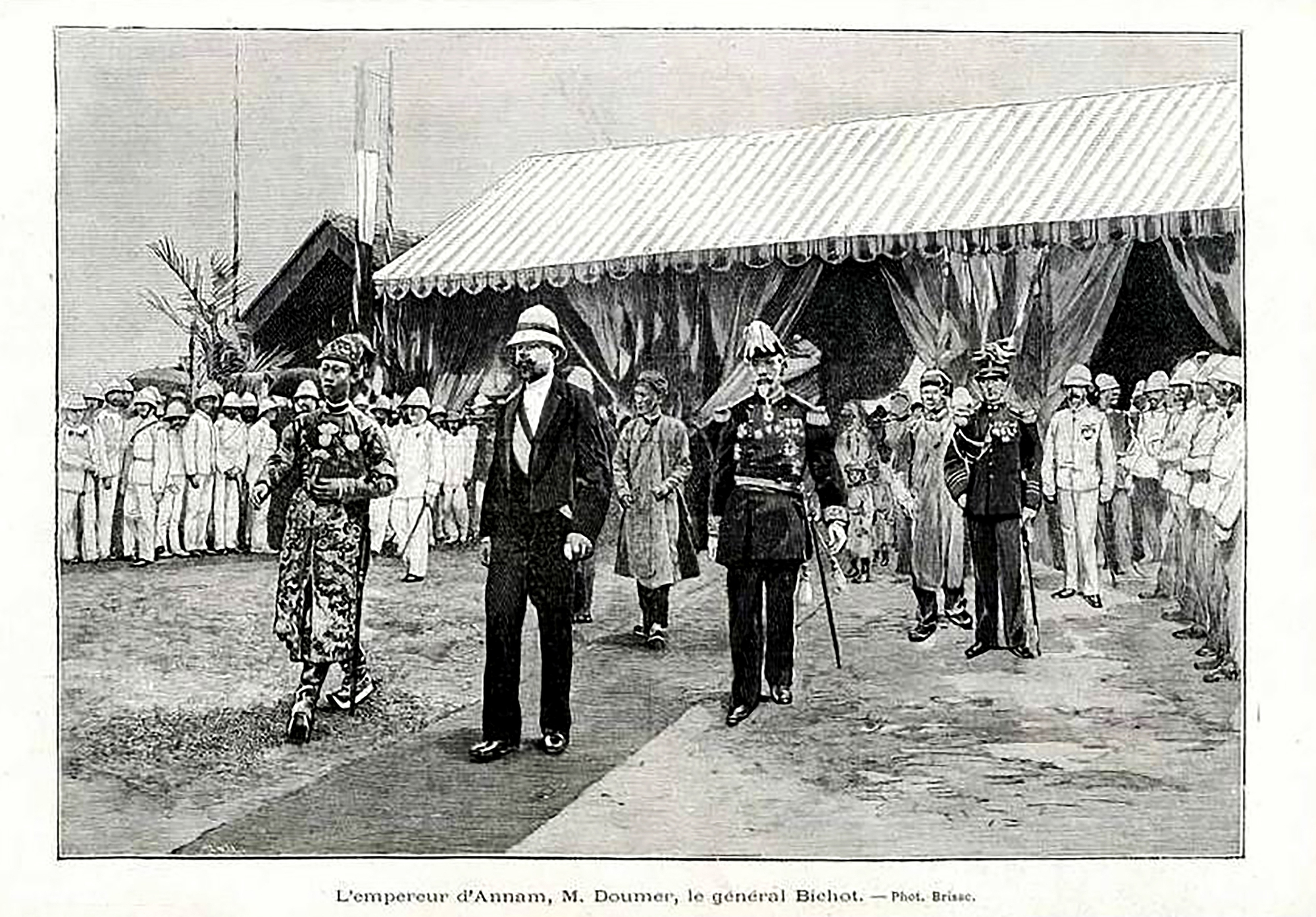
Thanh Thai with French Indochina governor Paul Doumer

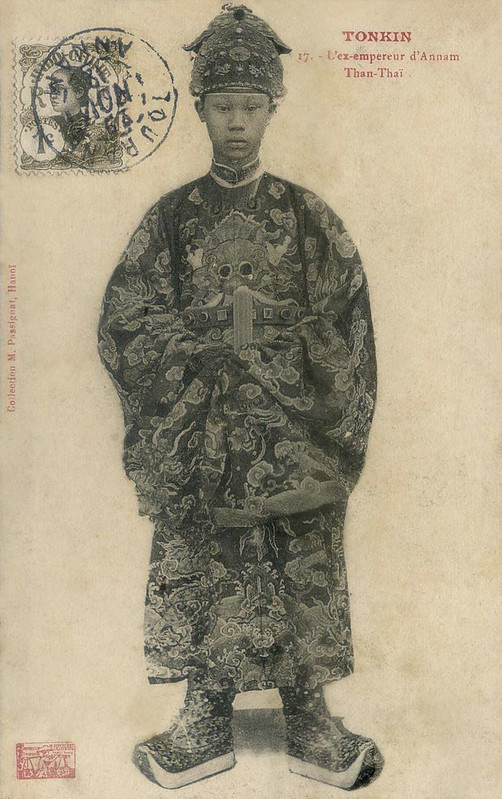
Emperor Thanh Thai

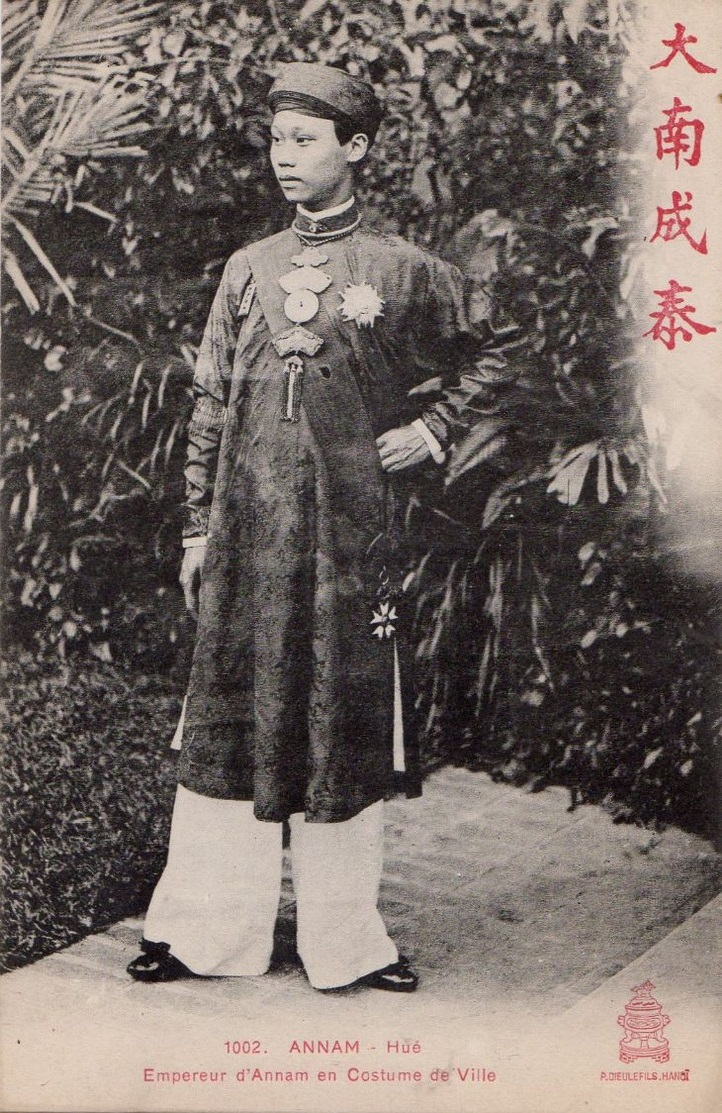
Emperor Thanh Thai

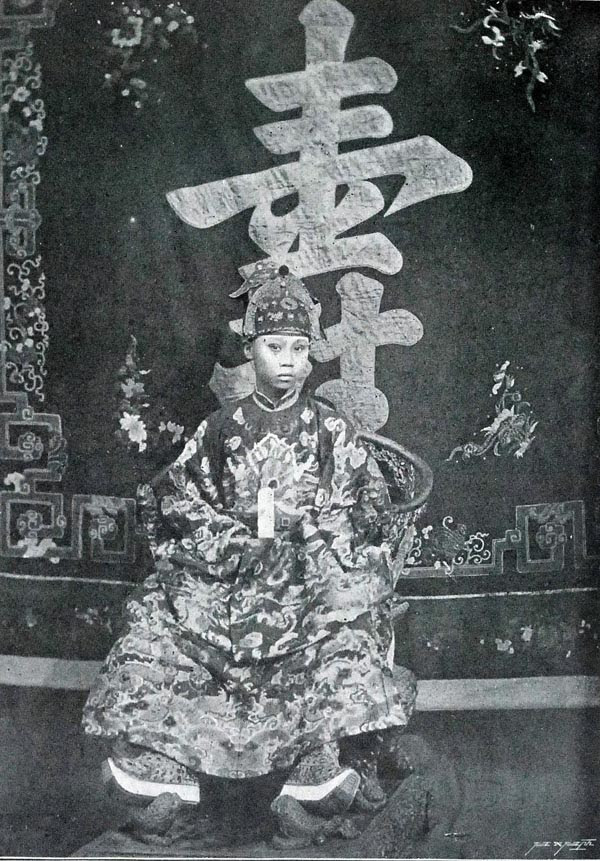
Emperor Thanh Thai

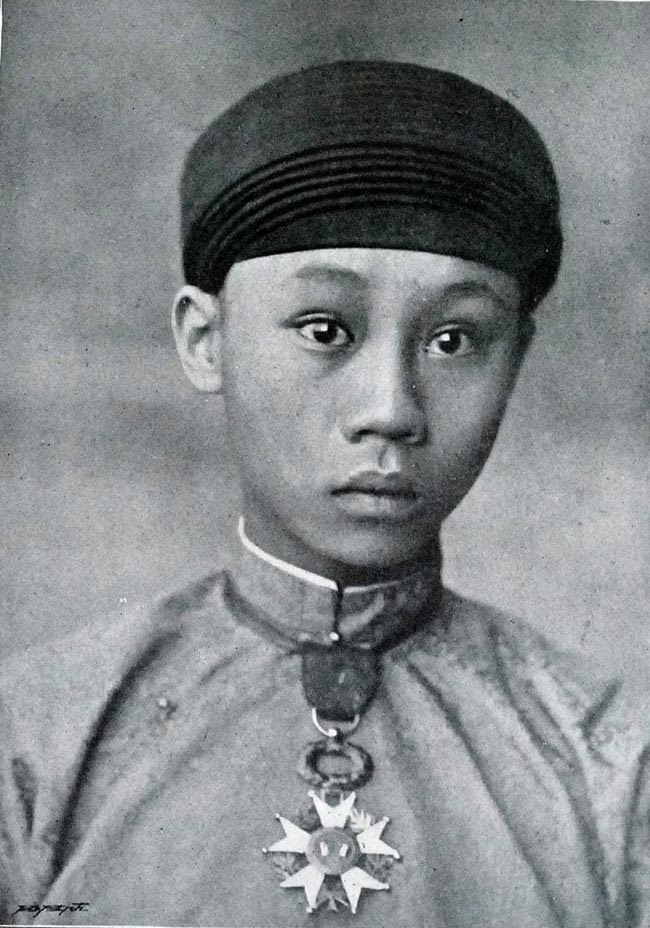
Emperor Thanh Thai

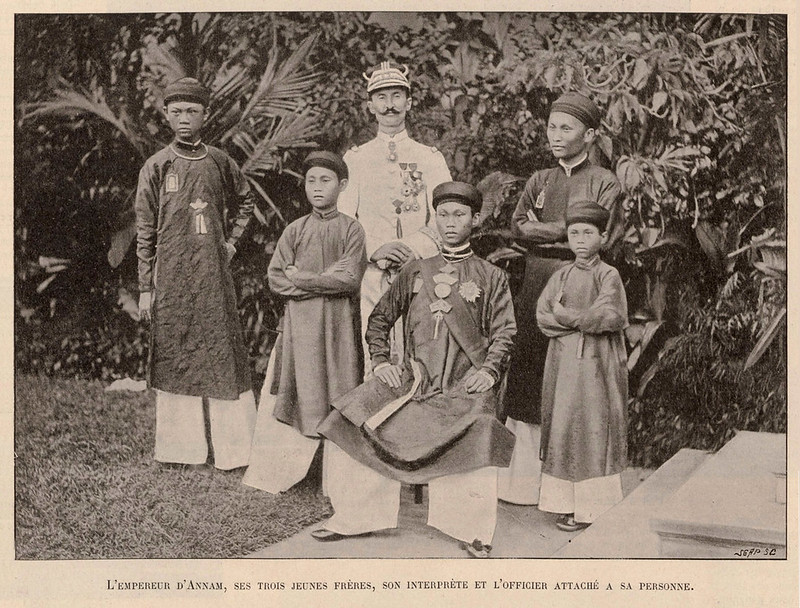
Emperor (seat) and his siblings

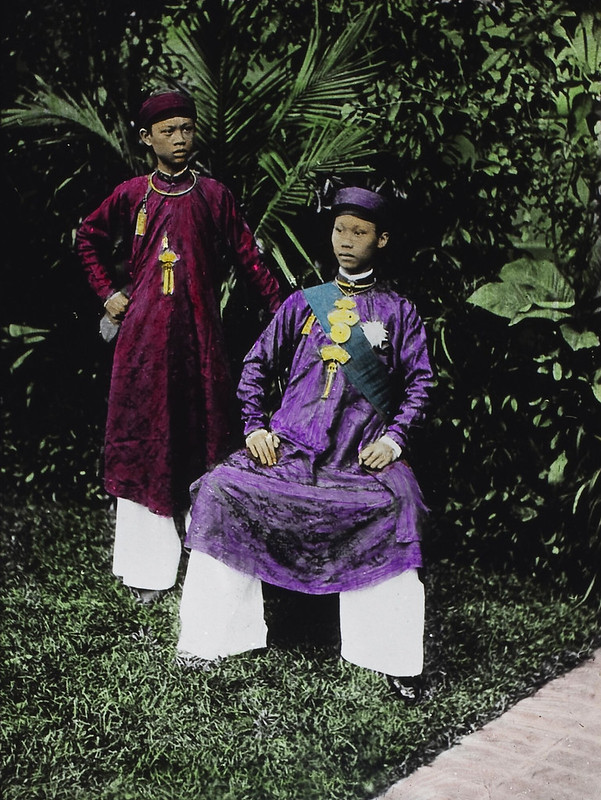
Emperor Thanh Thai (purple) and his younger brother Nguyễn Phúc Bửu Tán

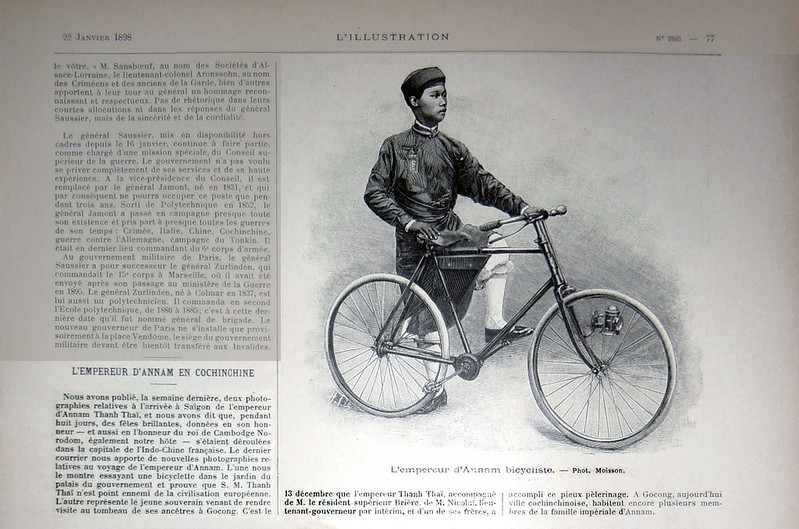
Thanh Thai riding bicycle in French press

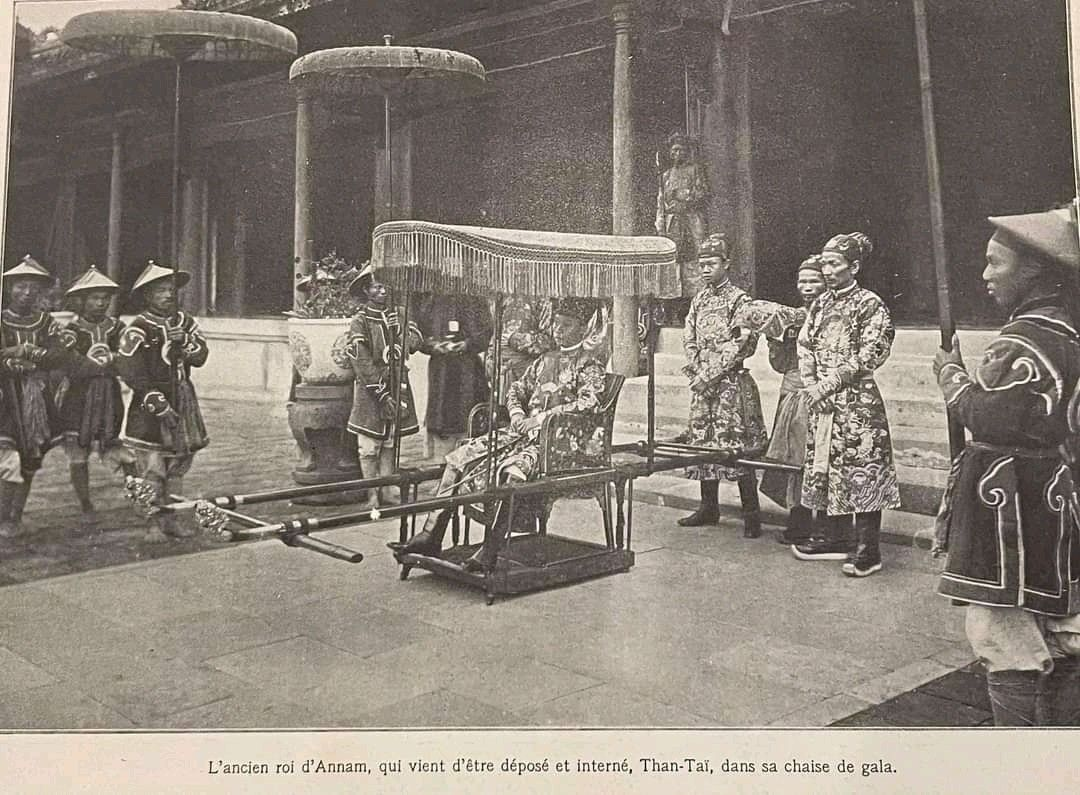
Emperor Thành Thái in palanquin

Thành Thái Nguyen dynasty Born: 14 March 1869 Died: 24 March 1969
Regnal titles
Preceded by Đồng Khánh	Emperor of Vietnam; 1889–1907	Succeeded by Duy Tân
