= Nguyễn Trường Tộ =

Vietnamese official

Nguyễn Trường Tộ (chữ Hán: 阮長祚, IPA: [ŋʷǐənˀ ʈɨ̂əŋ tôˀ]; 1830–1871) was a Roman Catholic scholar and reformer during the reign of Tự Đức of the Nguyễn dynasty, the last sovereign Emperor of Vietnam under which the French colonial forces colonized the country. Nguyễn Trường Tộ was best known for his advocacy of his modernisation of Vietnam, criticising the rigid Confucianism of the Huế court.

== Life ==
=== Early years ===
Nguyễn Trường Tộ was born into a Roman Catholic family in Nghệ An Province in central Vietnam, approximately in the year 1830 (from 1827 to 1830). His native village of Bùi Chu is part of present-day Hung Trung village in Hưng Nguyên district of Nghe An province. In his youth, Nguyễn Trường Tộ studied with lower-level degree holders and retired officials, earning a reputation in his region as an excellent Confucian scholar. However, he was not permitted to sit for the imperial civil-service examinations from which governmental officials were selected because of his Catholicism, which he never renounced. With the officially sanctioned road to prominence closed to him, Nguyễn Trường Tộ earned his living by teaching Chinese, first at home, and from 1848 onwards at Nhà chung Xã Đoài, a local Roman Catholic seminary. There his quick intelligence and classical learning garnered the attention of a French missionary, Bishop Jean-Denis Gauthier (1810–1877) of the Paris-based Société des Missions Etrangères (Foreign Missions Society). Gauthier began teaching him French and Latin as well as the basics of European science.

At this point in his life, larger historical forces intervened. The Franco-Spanish invasion force landed in nearby Đà Nẵng harbour in August 1858 with the purpose of advancing European commercial and religious interests in Indochina. In a largely ineffective attempt to prevent communication between the invaders and the locally resident Catholic missionaries and their Vietnamese disciples, the Huế court of Emperor Tự Đức reinforced its legislation against Catholic proselytism (known in Vietnamese as dụ cấm đạo or "edict interdicting the [Catholic] religion") by imposing stricter penalties and exhorting the imperial officials to be more strident in enforcing them. To escape Huế's anti-Catholic restriction, Gauthier and Nguyễn Trường Tộ fled to Đà Nẵng in 1859, placing themselves under the military protection of the besieged European forces then occupying central coast enclaves in the vicinity. From Đà Nẵng, Gauthier took Nguyễn Trường Tộ to Hong Kong, Penang in Malaysia, and other places in Southeast Asia where the Foreign Missions Society had established seminaries.

During this time, Tộ was further exposed to Western education by reading French language newspapers and books in addition to materials available through Chinese translation. Although many Vietnamese scholars have traditionally believed that Gauthier also took Tộ to France during 1859–60, this view has been challenged. In a 1941 article entitled Nguyễn Trường Tộ học ở đâu? (Where did Nguyen Truong Study?), Dao Duy Anh argued that there was no solid evidence for this belief except for an unofficial and unverifiable demotic script document shown to several researchers in the early 20th century by Tộ's descendants. In more recent times, the historian Truong Ba Can demonstrated that according to the files of the Foreign Missions Society's headquarters in Paris, Gauthier definitely did not venture to France during 1859–60. While these scholars refute the orthodox view that Gauthier took Tộ to France during 1859–60, it remains possible that Gauthier may have taken Tộ to Hong Kong and then sent him to France alone or escorted by another person. With the present primary sources, it was not possible for historians to determine with certainty whether Tộ visited France prior to 1867, when he traveled there as part of an official Vietnamese delegation sent by Tự Đức.

=== Return to Vietnam ===
Prior to 1848, Tộ had mastered the classical Vietnamese education through traditional means of study, although he had not earned any civil service degrees. Between 1848 and 1863 (the year in which he submitted his first petitions to Tự Đức advocating policy reform), he had been exposed to a broad range of Western ideas by reading European books in French and in Chinese translation and by studying under and discussing with European missionaries in Vietnam and in the Foreign Missions Society's Asian seminaries. According to Mark McLeod, "no other Vietnamese had so thoroughly combined study of these two traditions at such an early date."

Upon returning to Vietnam in 1861, Tộ briefly served the French colonial forces in southern Vietnam, translating Chinese language documents for the French navy's Admiral Charner in the negotiations that eventually led to the "unequal treaty" signed by France and Vietnam in 1862. This came in the wake of a 1859 invasion by France and Spain of Vietnam. The Europeans had intended to attack Đà Nẵng and Huế in central Vietnam and to force Tự Đức to surrender, so that they could extract territorial and trade concessions. Since the central areas near the imperial fortress were heavily defended, the European forces diverted themselves to the southern region, and in 1862, the Nguyễn court ceded three southern provinces to the French. In addition, the free practice and propagation of Christianity was allowed, in addition to financial compensation.

Although this collaboration with the invading Europeans was widely criticized by Tộ's Confucian contemporaries, many of whom forwarded petitions to Tự Đức Emperor lobbying for a death sentence for treason, most modern Vietnamese scholars (communist and non-communist alike) are in agreement that his actions were driven by a sincere, if misguided, patriotism. According to these scholars, To's collaboration with the French was based on the assumption that a temporary peace was necessary for Vietnam to buy time to undertake nation building through Westernization, after which a renewed battle against European imperialism and political domination could be successfully fought. This assessment of To's motivations is in line with the fact that while still working as a translator for the French, he informed Vietnamese negotiator Phan Thanh Gian of the French admirals' intention of using the pretender Le Duy Phung of the deposed Lê dynasty to harass Nguyên imperial troops in Tonkin, and warned Vietnamese court officials that the three westernmost provinces of southern Vietnam (An Giang, Vinh Long, and Ha Tien) were to be the next targets of French imperial aggression.

He died in Xã Đoài 22 November 1871.

== Advocacy ==
Contemporary Vietnamese historians' evaluations of To's nationalist motivations are buttressed by the record of his petitions to Tự Đức for reform, which were intended to allow Vietnam to profit from a period of peace by strengthening itself through Westernizing reforms, after which she could reassert herself and "take back in the West what was lost in the East". Between 1863 and his death in 1871, Tộ sent the Nguyễn court more than fifteen major petitions, the most important of which were as follows: Giáo môn luận (On Religious Sects), March 1863, which defended the role of Catholicism in Vietnam during the conquest and advocated freedom of worship; Thiên hạ đại thế luận (On the World Situation), March–April 1863, argued that Vietnam had no viable alternative to peace with France in the short term; Ngôi vua là qúy, chức quan là bóng (Precious is the Throne, Respected is the Official), May 1866, which proposed political and bureaucratic reforms; Kế họach gây nên nhân tài (A Plan for Creating Men of Talent), September 1866, urged Western studies for training a new Vietnamese bureaucratic elite; Tệ cấp bát điều (Eight Urgent Matters), November 1867, lobbied for reform in eight areas, including education, fiscal policy and defense.

=== Petitions ===
The petitions from Tộ were well received by Tự Đức, who invited him to court on several occasions. Tự Đức was sufficiently confident of To's good intentions that he called on him for state service, notably in January 1867. Tộ, Gauthier, and a number of Nguyên officials were sent to France to procure modern machinery and textbooks and to hire French experts to travel to Vietnam as instructors. Tự Đức planned to open a school for studying Western technology, which would have represented a victory for the reforms that Tộ had advocated. However, the project never materialised due to rising tensions between the two countries. In June 1867 while Tộ's delegation was still in Europe, French forces seized the three Western provinces of southern Vietnam, causing a recurrent escalation in anti-French and anti-Catholic agitation among the Vietnamese elite. As a result, the Huế court ordered the delegation to cap its purchases and return to Vietnam as early as possible. With the mission aborted, Tộ returned to Vietnam, arriving in the spring of 1868 with some of the machinery and textbooks. But the products were placed in storage and the school was never opened. After his return to Vietnam, Tộ was well treated by the Huế court but was not assigned further work. He spent his last years in his native province of Nghe An, predominantly working on the construction and repair of Catholic religious edifices in cooperation with Gauthier. Tộ continued to send Tự Đức proposals containing his plans for reform and advice on diplomatic strategy until his death on November 22, 1871. Only one of these had any notable impact in Huế, however. In Spring 1871, learning of France's defeat by Prussia in the Franco-Prussian War, Tộ urged the Tự Đức to launch a counteroffensive against French positions in the colony of Cochinchina, hoping that the politicians in Paris would be distracted with battles in Europe. Tộ personally volunteered to lead Vietnamese troops, and although he was briefly called to Huế to discuss the European political situation with the emperor, Tự Đức stuck to his status quo policy of biding time and refused to order any attack.

=== Rejection ===
Despite indications of imperial confidence in Tộ himself, his ideas and proposals for reform were for the large part rejected or ignored by the mandarin political elite, including Tự Đức. Such reforms were implemented piecemeal or not at all. What little reforms that were instituted had no positive influence in impeding the inevitable extension of French domination over all of Vietnam by the end of the 19th century. The reasons for Tự Đức's ultimate rejection of Tộ's proposals have long been a subject of speculation among historians. These range from suggestions that the emperor and his court were so inflexible in their Confucianism that any thought of Western-influenced reforms was anathema to a more moderate explanation that, while not denying the existence of an anti-reform consensus among high-level officials, painted Tự Đức as a "frustrated reformer" initially favourable to Tộ's proposals for nation building through Westernization but prevented from implementing them by Huế mandarins who feared losing their privileges and powers by abolishing the system which nourished them.

=== Confucianism ===
Primary sources from the Nguyễn court's records suggest that Tự Đức's non-implementation of Tộ's proposals was due to a rigid Confucianism. Tự Đức, a scholarly minded emperor, was known for his interest in and familiarity with Western science and technology. He regularly read Chinese language newspapers from Hong Kong and occasionally organized discussions among the mandarins on technical and commercial subjects. Excerpts from these articles and the resulting discussions were entered at the emperor's order in the dynasty's official histories, including the Đại Nam Thực Lục (Veritable Records of the Great South). However, Tự Đức often used his knowledge of European learning to refute, sometimes sarcastically, those who urged its widespread adoption, thereby sending messages to present and future officials that he valued Vietnam's Confucian traditions far too much to allow their contamination by foreign studies and practices that he considered barbaric. Using his position as royal examiner for the civil service examinations, Tự Đức drafted questions and commentaries that dealt specifically with the issue of Western-style reforms, clearly indicating the negative response that was expected of candidates. On one occasion, Tự Đức began by asserting the indivisibility of rulership and classical studies, the implication being that adopting European studies would lead to a rupture between morality and government. Expecting arguments praising the efficacy of Western scientific methods, Tự Đức wrote that all of the European devices had been known to ancient Eastern sages, and their secrets could thus be found in the classical texts rather than in Western books. Tự Đức Emperor believed that the threats posed by the French could only be defeated through renewed dedication to the Confucian political doctrines on which Vietnamese social and political institutions were based. He felt that successful resistance to French imperialism at the price of adopting Western ways would not solve the fundamental prerogative of protecting Vietnam's classical East Asian civilization from what he regarded as the subversive potential of a culturally inferior, barbaric people.

=== Scholar analysis ===
Several western or Western-trained scholars have analyzed Tộ's thought, focusing on the question of change versus continuity and generally emphasizing the latter. Trương Bửu Lâm argued that Tộ's reform proposals were lacking in originality and were wholly compatible with the existing imperial system, asserting that it represented a "stand of conservatism". Emphasizing the influence of Confucianism in Tộ's thought, he concluded:

Exposed to modern ideas by his religion, he yet clung to the old order in which he was trained. The reforms he advocated were by no means revolutionary: he conceived of them within the framework of the monarchy that Vietnam had known for centuries.

Georges Boudarel agreed with Lam's analysis that Tộ's proposed reform program presented no challenge to the 19th century imperial order. Boudarel said that Tộ advocated a "policy of temporization" to buy time for "essentially administrative and technical reforms" to strengthen Vietnam and then to recover the lost sovereignty and territories by military counterattack. He concluded that

Neither in theory nor in practice did [To] call into question the established order.... [His] plans anticipated the modernization of the country without touching the fundamental principle of the monarchy and the mandarinate. None of these tendencies addressed the social and political problems themselves.

Boudarel however, did note that the reforms would have eliminated the scholar class and "transform[ed] the celestial bureaucracy into a modern-style techno-structure," although not challenging the upper realms of the Nguyễn system. In addition, John DeFrancis dismissed Tộ's proposals for social and political reform as "quite moderate in nature".

=== Ruler and society ===
To's view of the relationship between society and its ruler magnified the Confucian concept of the subject's obligation of loyalty to the monarch (trung quân) by reinforcing it with the Catholic notion of monarchical rule by divine right. He had a modernist vision of historical change, emphasizing the dynamic factor of humanity's perpetually increasing ability to understand and exploit their surroundings. Based on his analysis of historical causality, Tộ argued that the reliance of European countries on "practical studies" as the criteria for training and selecting political decision makers was the secret of their rise to world dominance. He proposed that such a practice should thus be adopted by Vietnam. Vietnam's Confucianist obsession with humanistic and literary studies, as manifested in its mandarin examinations, Tộ believed, was the underlying cause of its lack of dynamism and inability to repel the technologically superior Western powers. Tộ concluded that Vietnam should cease its emphasis on classical Confucian studies in favour of European "practical studies" as the basis for the formation and selection of the ruling elite as well as for the moral sustenance of the people. Tộ argued that whatever "morality gap" might arise from this change would be filled by an all-encompassing legal system, which he saw as a temporal manifestation of God's heavenly morality, to which everyone up to the emperor would be required to submit.

Tộ staunchly defended the absolute monarchy, but understood the relationship between the emperor and his subjects differently from his Confucian contemporaries. Drawing upon the classical Confucian argument from nature, Nguyễn Trường Tộ wrote in "Tế cấp bát điều":

Every living thing in this world is endowed with a distinct nature, and thus each must have a distinct charge to fulfill.... It is the same with human beings – the king, the official, the soldier, the subject, each has distinct obligations. Thus, with each in the appropriate position, everyone has a specific duty.

Tộ did not find Confucian justifications of imperial authority to be sufficient, reinforcing them with the Catholic defense of monarchy by divine right. According to Tộ, as the Lord rules all creation, the terrestrial emperor represents God in ruling a state. Since the monarch is to represent God on earth, Tộ explained in the same document that "all power to act in a country should rest with the king". In Tộ's view, a subject who infringed upon this authority, for whatever reason, was guilty of tội, a noun for offences which also means "sin" in a religious context as well as "crime" or "offence" in a political or legal context. Based on this line of reasoning, Tộ disputed Mencius' argument that the populace was more important than the ruler, and denied Mencius' contention that the subject had an inherent right to remove a tyrant who was unworthy of the throne. In ‘’Ngoi vua la quy chuc quan la trong’’, Tộ asserted that "the king and his officials are principal in importance in a country". He regarded any form of rebellion to be illegitimate, regardless of the ruler's character or conduct:

Without the king and his officials, it would not be long before the people would begin to create disturbances, competing to take the supreme position, usurping one another, fostering discord throughout the land. Thus, a country with a tyrannical king is still better off than it would be if it had no king.

Tộ concluded that Mencius’ argument "has opened the door for innumerable perverted scholars . . . to use the justification of the public good in order to promote their own private interests."

In opposition to Mencius' endorsement of rebellion against tyrannical rule, Tộ maintained that the emperor and his officials should not be held responsible for natural disasters and social wrongs, which he believed were acts of God. Tộ claimed that this was understood by people in Western countries:

The people [in Western countries] know that their own faults are many and that the Lord uses [natural] disasters to warn them [to repent]. This explains many of the [causes for] hardships and inequality among the people. These occurrences are not attributed to the actions of the king and his officials. [The people] would not dare to blame them on the authorities.

Tộ believed that if the emperor and the court officials were truly wrong, their subjects nevertheless had no option except to bear the consequences without complaining:

The duty of the subject is simply to support the-king and venerate his officials. If the king and his officials make mistakes, then the entire country should do nothing but endure the [resulting] pain and misery.

Furthermore, since he considered the ruler to be the terrestrial representative of Heavenly Virtue, Tộ argued that even an "inhuman king" (vua vô đạo) could not be regarded as being equivalent to an ordinary person, let alone a usurper or scoundrel, and to kill or depose him would be the equivalent of killing the God. He claimed:

To punish the people causes but little harm to a country, whereas to punish the king could cause great damage.... Furthermore, the common people of a kingdom often commit crimes, and the Lord uses the king as a scourge in punishing the offenders. Thus, to kill the king is no different from killing the Lord Himself.

=== Conclusion ===
Tộ concluded his discussion of the relationship between ruler and subject by asserting that the ideal scenario would be one in which a country is ruled continuously by a single dynasty as in Japan; however, irrespective of the personal ability or moral character of individual rulers, the obligation of the subject was to manifest loyalty to the emperor. In applying the ideology of divine-right monarchy to the Nguyễn dynasty, Tộ was not following the lead of his French Catholic missionary teachers, for the preachers had never done so. Missionaries had long sought to depose the Nguyễn, either through inciting internal revolt or by lobbying for European military intervention or through a combination of both, as happened during the initial invasion of southern Vietnam. Ideologically, 19th century Catholic missionaries in Vietnam taught their Vietnamese converts the doctrines expounded by 17th century missionary Alexandre de Rhodes in his seminal bilingual Latin-Vietnamese Catechism. This held that the individual Catholic's obligation to the God took precedence over his or her duty to human authority. The authority of family hierarchy and superiors in the Confucian political hierarchy was recognized to the extent that it did not contradict divine prerogatives. The Catholic missionaries' conception weakened the loyalty of Vietnamese Catholics to their emperor because the will of God could only be interpreted for them by their European missionaries and the local priests and catechists under the supervision of the missionaries. During the 19th century Franco-Spanish attacks on Vietnam, a large number of Vietnamese Catholics had obeyed their missionaries' calls to support the European invaders against their emperor.

=== Political loyalty ===
Tộ was deeply affected by the debate over the political loyalty of the Catholic Vietnamese during the 19th century French invasion, as indicated in his petition "Giáo môn luận". He claimed that only "one in one hundred or one thousand" Vietnamese Catholics betrayed their nation, bemoaning that Tự Đức was tarring all of his Catholic subjects as traitors. He asserted that any Catholics who were betraying their nation would also be by definition betraying their religion. Tộ believed that, for a Vietnamese, conversion to Catholicism did not necessarily mean rejection of Tự Đức's legitimacy and betrayal of the Vietnamese homeland.

Tộ had a generally progressive vision of historical change, emphasizing the causal impetus of human action, particularly humanity's ever increasing ability to comprehend and manipulate nature. Belief in destiny and other supernatural influences were present in his writings but received only marginal emphasis. In many of his reform proposals, Tộ went to lengths in an attempt to convince skeptical Confucian readers by repeatedly asserting that Vietnam could incorporate the new without abandoning the ideas of the establishment. This may have caused modern scholars to underestimate the profundity of the changes that Tộ was actually proposing. However, the historical analysis that buttressed Tộ's reforms criticized Vietnam's use of traditional Confucian study of literature for the training and selection of the ruling bureaucracy, presenting such studies as the cause of the decay of the Vietnamese state. Tộ advocated replacing study of Confucian literature with the study of social and particularly natural sciences as practiced in Europe.

=== Progressive development ===
Tộ saw historical development as progressive, using an analogy in "Tế cấp bát điều" with the stages of human life:

A person is born and grows from the period of nursing to the period of infancy, to the period of youth, and then on into old age.... The success or failure of any enterprise undertaken while young cannot be determined until adulthood. Only then can a person's capacities begin to compensate for the mistakes of youth and begin to leave something worthwhile for old age. The accomplishments of former times were only adequate to supply humanity with the barest necessities. But compared to later ages, these achievements are but child's play.

The general process of development implied by the analogy that Tộ used was not seen by him as inexorable or universal. Progress could be slowed by an inability or unwillingness of humans to understand or accept change. Tộ argued that such failures were the cause of Vietnam's backward position with respect to the European powers. He argued that Vietnam had failed to progress due to what he regarded as the pernicious and regressive influence of Confucianism on the minds of the Vietnamese elite. He wrote in "Tế cấp bát điều":

[A]t present there are many who still cannot understand the process of development leading from former times to our own time. Instead, they ardently praise antiquity, asserting that succeeding ages cannot equal it. In everything, they want to return to former times. [They] have caused our country to take the wrong road and to become feeble, unable to develop and prosper.

Tộ argued that Asia in general, and not only Vietnam, had taken the same "wrong road" and had failed to meet the challenge of the progressive, dynamic West. He claimed that the East had been the source of all the arts and sciences known to the world. He asserted that instead of developing and honing such advantages, Eastern civilizations had been content to remain in a state of triumphalism and indulged a love of stability. He said that Europeans had appropriated these arts, developed them to higher standards and used them to establish a dominant global influence.

In Tộ's analysis, the driving force in these historical transformations, which laid the foundation for the opportunity to create an age of Western imperialism, was simply a society's willingness, or conversely, a refusal to apply itself to the systematic study and the practical exploitation of the natural environment. The rise of Europe to international domination was in Tộ's view, neither secular nor inevitable. In "Kế hoạch gây nên nhân tài", he illustrated his theory with reference to the fall of the Roman Empire, which he attributed to the Roman elite's obsession with the study of literature:

The military accomplishments of this empire were renowned throughout the four oceans ..., and it created many extraordinary things that have been handed down to the present age. But from approximately the middle point of the empire's existence onward, those responsible for protecting the city only organized festivals and feasts for their enjoyment, while those on the front lines only prized literary studies as a means of advancement. The superior men who emerged at that time wrote and reasoned in the literary style only, considering themselves elevated and distinguished. The study of practical matters was gradually abandoned, and as a result barbarians from the North-West crushed and divided this great power.

=== Power imbalance ===
Tộ related this hypothesis for the explanation of the collapse of Rome to the contemporary power imbalance between East and West by asserting that European states had learned from Rome's fall and replaced literary studies with the scientific study of natural phenomena:

Afterwards, the Westerners heeded this warning, and so in selecting their officials, they absolutely never have literary examinations. . . . Indeed, a poem will never compel invaders to retreat, nor will a thousand empty words ever lead to any useful plan.

Tộ attempted to show the existence of a causal link between literary studies and the decline of Asia—and, conversely, between practical studies and the rise of Europe. He constructed the historical basis for his critical assessment of classical Confucian literary studies. In the context of the 19th century Vietnamese imperial state, the criticism of its bureaucratic structure was the most radical aspect of his reform proposals. Tộ argued that the examination system that shaped and selected the imperial political elite was a Chinese anachronism directly responsible for Vietnam's inability to respond effectively to the challenges posed by French aggression. His proposals harshly criticized the study of Chinese antiquity, which he deemed irrelevant to contemporary Vietnam. In "Tế cấp bát điều", Tộ wrote:

When [our Vietnamese scholars] are young, they study the astronomy, geography, politics, and customs of the Central Kingdom . . . yet when they mature, they must deal with the astronomy, geography, politics, and customs of the South [of Vietnam], which have no relationship whatsoever to what was in their books. . . . Never has the world seen such an eccentric educational system.

=== Sarcasm ===
Tộ's writing was laced with scathing sarcasm that betrayed his sense of patriotic outrage. He asserted in "Tế cấp bát điều" that the study of Vietnamese history and geography had far more value for Vietnamese scholars than traditional studies of Chinese antiquity:

Our country . . . has its own human events and morality. These are the things that . . . our officials and people must study diligently so that . . . their determination to protect this heritage will be stimulated.... Our country also had famous luminaries, and their deeds are worthy examples. Why do we not teach of their actions instead of tirelessly reciting the names of persons who have been dead for thousands of years? . . .Studying in this way until one is old is truly a strange practice!

Tộ declared that Vietnam's classical Confucianist education system had created a class of social parasites who obsessively refined their knowledge of literature in self-absorbed ignorance of the imminent dangers to their homeland:

At present in our country, there are those who eat but do not plough, who do not study yet seek to become officials, whose judgement is limited but whose arrogance is boundless, who do not do their duty, and who know nothing of morality

He said that the French "would treat our people like fish on the chopping block" and lamented the lack of foresight of the mandarins in seeing this, asking "why is it that only very few people pay attention to these matters, instead thinking only of how to compete with each other, word by word and phrase by phrase, seeking to develop a superb style?"

Tộ frequently asserted that Vietnam's impotence in the face of foreign aggression was primarily due to the existing sociopolitical system's grounding in Chinese classical studies. He concluded this necessitated sweeping measures; his proposals advocated wide-ranging ideological and institutional transformations that would have had drastically transformations on the social and political infrastructure. His proposals called for a strong reduction in the importance of classical studies and the morality fostered thereby. This is manifested in his proposed changes for the civil service examination system, which went beyond the examinations to include the curricula, pedagogy, and the social and fiscal status of students and graduates. According to Tộ, those seeking imperial posts should be required to master "realistic studies" (những bài học thiết thực), including agricultural administration, law, mechanics, astronomy, geography and foreign languages. Commenting on the reduced role of classical literature in such a reformed curriculum, he wrote:

As for poetry, it is only used for chanting verses to the flowers and the moon; when one is hungry, it cannot be cooked to make a filling meal. In regard to . . . the classical texts, they have already been clearly explained and commented upon by previous scholars, and there is no need for our students to complicate these commentaries further. . . one need only understand the meaning.

He denounced the emphasis placed on contemplating the meaning of such literature, spending "days and months writing about them in the useless, archaic, eight-legged style."

Beyond this generational change in the syllabus for the examinations, Tộ also proposed several measures designed to erode the privileges and prestige that Confucian scholars derived from the examination system. He argued that the country had long spoiled the scholars with a misguided policy known as lệ nhiều học, a "dispensation for studies" that exempted scholars from paying head tax (thuế thân) and corvée labor. As a result, he condemned these exemptions and demanded their abolition:

Nowhere else under Heaven can such a regulation be found. And yet one does not see an increase in the talent that our country has at its disposal; nor does one observe a decrease of talent in other countries [that do not have this practice]. ....This gang of scholars is robbing the state of its tax revenues in the most skillful manner

Along similar reasoning, Tộ suggested that some degree holders be obliged to abandon their literature studies altogether to receive military training, after which they could be conscripted into the armed forces. Such a scheme, he reasoned, would strengthen national defence and remove what he regarded as the pernicious influence of the scholars:

Why does the court not select those among the cu-nhan and tu-tai degree-holders who are physically sound and require them to abandon literature for the martial arts? ...After they have studied military affairs, ...they could be examined and given commissions. ...Would this not be better than leaving them free to meddle in ... village life?

=== Educational reforms ===
Tộ's educational reforms sought to replace traditional Confucian political indoctrination and moral cultivation with “realistic studies”, meaning an emphasis on European disciplines but with a curriculum grounded in contemporary Vietnamese reality. Since Confucian ethics had historically played a dominant role in East Asian civilizations, it was incumbent upon Tộ to convince his Confucian audience that morality would not erode as a result. Tộ asserted that the phasing out of Confucian morality would usher in the rule of law. He argued that relying on an extensive legal system would not be dangerous to morality—as many Confucians believed—but manifested a superior and different form of morality:

It is often said that rules and regulations are only to aid in governing, that they contain no intrinsic, perfect morality. People ... do not understand that activities contrary to the law are sinful, while those in accord with the law are virtuous. ...Nothing is greater than the selfless public spirit, which is thus [equivalent to] Heavenly morality.

In order to create and enforce the laws under his proposed reform system, Tộ envisioned the creation of an independent judiciary in the form of a powerful Law Ministry (Bộ Luật), to which all even the emperor would have to submit. He said that this European system was superior because in this case, “the king cannot sentence someone on his own initiative without the approval of these officials.”

In order to maintain the independence of this proposed ministry, Tộ called for its officials to be protected from the influence of the monarch and his officials. Tộ's model proposed that the legal mandarins could be promoted but not demoted by their superiors. This legal system was consistent with Tộ's proposal that Confucian values be removed from its preeminent position in the Nguyễn court. On the contrary, his assertion that obeying the law “fulfills the Way of the human being” suggests that Confucian concepts of morality and duty continued to influence his understanding of European legal systems.

Tộ's concern in forming a theoretical foundation for defending the loyalty of Vietnamese Catholics to Tự Đức led him to merge into his political theory a variant of the Catholic notion of divine-right kingship. This hybrid model allowed him to counter Mencius’ restricted justification of rebellion against tyrannical rule. But Tộ's concern to solidify a Catholic defence of the Vietnamese monarchy conflicted with his support for the rule of law in European liberal-democratic political systems. This contradiction is manifested in the apparent inconsistency between his Catholic Confucian defence of absolute monarchy and his advocacy of an independent judiciary charged with legislation and enforcement of laws binding upon emperor and commoner alike. Tộ's identification of the law with “Heavenly morality” was interpreted as an attempt to eliminate any inconsistency by reasoning that the sanctification of the law parallels the consecration of the monarchy.
