= Treaty of Huế (1884) =

1884 treaty establishing French colonial rule in Vietnam

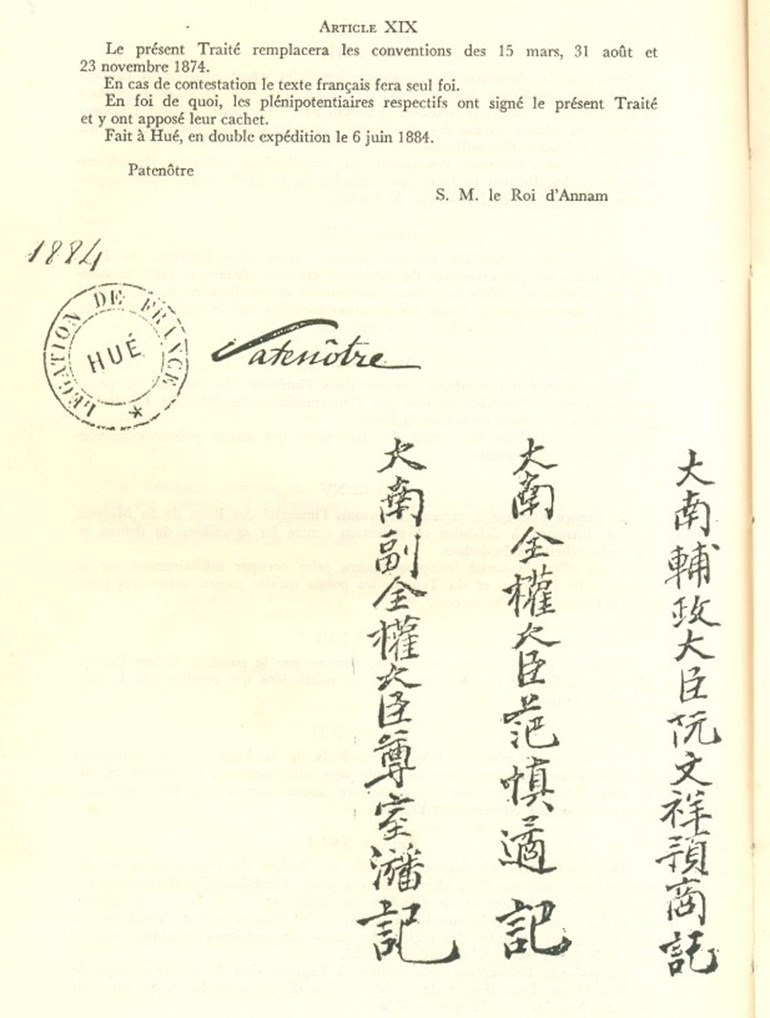
- The signatures of Jules Patenôtre, Nguyễn Văn Tường, Phạm Thận Duật, and Tôn Thất Phan.
- Type: Protectorate treaty
- Context: France establishes two protectorates over the Nguyễn dynasty.
- Signed: June 6, 1884
- Location: Huế, Đại Nam
- Expiration: March 8, 1949 (the Élysée Accords were signed)
- Signatories: Jules Patenôtre; Nguyễn Văn Tường (阮文祥); Phạm Thận Duật (范慎遹); Tôn Thất Phan (尊室灞)
- Parties: France; Đại Nam
- Ratifiers: France; Đại Nam
- Languages: Classical Chinese; French

The Treaty of Huế or Protectorate Treaty (Vietnamese: Hòa ước Giáp Thân 1884, or Hòa ước Patenotre, or Hòa ước Patơnốt) was concluded on 6 June 1884 between France and Đại Nam (Vietnam/Nguyễn dynasty). It restated the main tenets of the punitive Harmand Treaty of 25 August 1883, but softened some of the harsher provisions of this treaty. The treaty created the protectorates of Annam (central Vietnam) and Tonkin (northern Vietnam). It formed the basis of French colonial rule in Vietnam during the next seven decades and was negotiated by Jules Patenôtre, France's minister to China; it is often known as the Patenôtre Treaty. The treaty was signed on the Vietnamese side by Phạm Thận Duật and Tôn Thất Phan, representatives of the emperor Tự Đức’s court. The treaty marked the Nguyễn dynasty's second acceptance of French protectorate in central and northern Vietnam, but it was canceled when the Élysée Accords was signed on 8 March 1949.

Despite the government of the Nguyễn dynasty canceling the treaty with the Japanese help in 1945, the French didn't recognise the end of the protectorates until the signing of the Élysée Accords on 8 March 1949. The treaty officially transferred sovereignty over Vietnam to former emperor Bảo Đại and the Provisional Central Government of Vietnam. The treaty also recognized Vietnamese sovereignty over Cochinchina in the South, which would return to Vietnam on June 4. The formal end of the Patenôtre Treaty was proclaimed during a ceremony at the Saigon-Cholon City Hall attended by the high commissioner of French Indochina Léon Pignon, Chief of State Emperor Bảo Đại, and delegates of the government of the State of Vietnam. During this ceremony Pignon officially renounced French sovereignty over Vietnam and recognised the independence of Vietnam, as an associated state within the French Union on June 14. The treaty led to the establishment of the State of Vietnam and would be completed on 2 February 1950.

== Background ==
On 6 June 1884, three weeks after the conclusion of the Tientsin Accord with China, which implicitly renounced China's historic suzerainty over Vietnam, the French concluded a treaty with Vietnam which provided for a French protectorate over both Annam and Tonkin. The treaty was negotiated for France by Jules Patenôtre, the new French minister to China.

The new treaty replaced the notoriously vague 'Philastre treaty' of 15 March 1874 (the Treaty of Saigon), which had given France limited commercial privileges in Tonkin. It restated, though in milder language, many of the provisions included in the punitive Harmand Treaty of August 1883, which had never been ratified by the French parliament. It entrenched the French protectorate over both Annam and Tonkin and allowed the French to station residents in most Vietnamese towns. It also granted certain trade privileges to France.

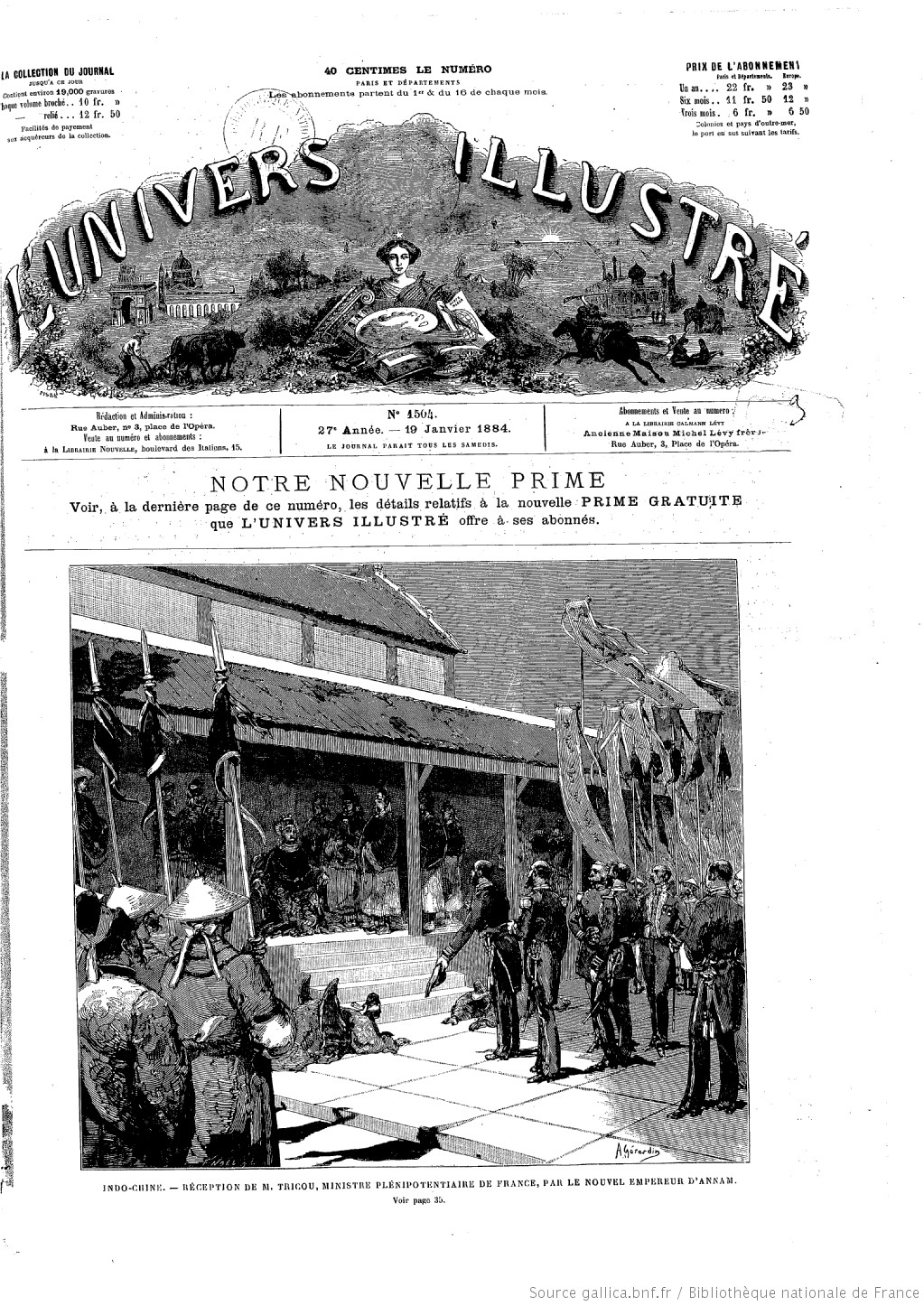
Indo-China - Reception of Mr. Arthur Tricou, Minister Plenipotentiary of France, by the new emperor of Annam.

Revision of the Harmand treaty had been foreshadowed in January 1884, when the French diplomat Arthur Tricou visited Huế to obtain its ratification from the Vietnamese government. Tricou hinted that some of the more objectionable clauses of the Harmand treaty might be revised if the Vietnamese demonstrated their sincerity, and on 1 January 1884 the Vietnamese government declared its full and complete adhesion to the Harmand treaty. Significantly, it also said that it 'trusted in the goodwill of the French Republic that some of its provisions would be softened at a later date' (s'en remettant au bon vouloir de la République quant aux adoucissements qui pourraient y être ultérieurement apportés).

One of the most problematic aspects of the Harmand Treaty, in the eyes of the Quai d'Orsay, was that it had imposed territorial concessions on Vietnam, annexing four provinces to Cochinchina and Tonkin. These provisions reflected Harmand's personal view that France should be aiming at the outright conquest of Vietnam. This was not the view of the French foreign ministry, which believed that it would be safer and more convenient for France to govern Vietnam indirectly, by means of a protectorate. Accordingly, by virtue of Articles 3 and 16, the French now restored to Vietnamese internal jurisdiction the provinces of Nghệ An, Thanh Hóa, Hà Tĩnh and Bình Thuận (Note: Ninh Thuận was also a part of Bình Thuận province at that time.), which the Harmand treaty had transferred to French control a year earlier.

In order to conceal the fact that China was in practice renouncing its suzerainty over Vietnam, Article IV of the Tientsin Accord bound France to abstain from using any language demeaning to the dignity of the Celestial Empire in its new treaty with Vietnam. Article I of the 1883 Harmand Treaty had contained the offensive phrase 'including China' (y compris la Chine) in the statement that France would henceforth control Vietnam's relations with other countries. Patenôtre removed this phrase, and Article I of the Patenôtre Treaty consequently makes no reference to China.

Although the French were careful to save Chinese face in the text of their treaties with China and Vietnam, the signature of the Patenôtre treaty was accompanied by an important symbolic gesture. The seal presented by the emperor of China several decades earlier to the Vietnamese king Gia Long was melted down in the presence of the French and Vietnamese plenipotentiaries. The seal, a silver plaque with gold plating, four and a half inches square and weighing thirteen pounds, bore the carving of a sitting camel. This renunciation by the Vietnamese of their long-standing ties to China was given wide publicity by the French. In French eyes, it made the point that France had effectively replaced China as the arbiter of Vietnamese affairs.

== Text of the treaty (original French) ==
The original French text of the treaty, in nineteen articles, is given below.

Art 1. L’Annam reconnaît et accepte le Protectorat de la France. La France représentera Annam dans toutes ses relations extérieures. Les Annamites à l'étranger seront placés sous la protection de la France.

Art. 2. Une force militaire française occupera Thuan-An d'une façon permanente. Tous les forts et ouvrages militaires de la rivière de Hué seront rasés.

Art. 3. Les fonctionnaires annamites, depuis la frontière de la Cochinchine jusqu’à la frontière de la province de Ninh-Binh, continueront à administrer les provinces comprises dans ces limites, sauf en ce qui concerne les douanes, les travaux publics et, en général, les services qui exigent une direction unique ou l'emploi d'ingénieurs ou d'agents européens.

Art. 4. Dans les limites ci-dessus indiquées, le Gouvernement annamite déclarera ouverts au commerce de toutes les nations, outre le port de Qui-Nhon, ceux de Tourane et de Xuan-Day. D’autres ports pourront être ultérieurement ouverts après une entente préalable. Le Gouvernement français y entretiendra des agents placés sous les ordres de son Résident à Hué.

Art. 5. Un Résident général, représentant du Gouvernement français, présidera aux relations extérieures de l'Annam et assurera l'exercice régulier du protectorat, sans s’immiscer dans l'administration locale des provinces comprises dans les limites fixées par l'article 3. Il résidera dans la citadelle de Hué avec une escorte militaire. Le Résident général aura droit d'audience privée et personnele auprès de Sa Majesté le Roi d'Annam.

Art. 6. Au Tonkin des Résidents ou Résidents-adjoints seront placés par le Gouvernement de la République dans les chefs-lieux où leur présence sera jugée utile. Ils seront sous les ordres du Résident général. Ils habiteront dans la citadelle, et, en tout cas, dans l'enceinte même réservée au mandarin; il leur sera donné, s’il y a lieu, une escorte française ou indigène.

Art. 7. Les Résidents éviteront de s’occuper des détails de l'administration des provinces. Les fonctionnaires indigènes de tout ordre continueront à gouverner et à administrer sous leur contrôle; mais ils devront être révoqués sur la demande des autorités françaises.

Art. 8. Les fonctionnaires et employés français de toute catégorie ne communiqueront avec les autorités annamites que par l'intermédiaire des Résidents.

Art. 9. Une ligne télégraphique sera établie de Saigon à Hanoi et exploitée par des employés français. Une partie des taxes sera attribuée au Gouvernement annamite qui concédera, en retour, le terrain nécessaire aux stations.

Art. 10. En Annam et au Tonkin, les étrangers de toute nationalité seront placés sous la juridiction française. L’autorité française statuera sur les contestations de quelque nature qu’elles soient qui s’élèveront entre Annamites et étrangers, de même qu’entre étrangers.

Art. 11. Dans l'Annam proprement dit, les Quan-Bo percevront l'impôt ancien sans le contrôle des fonctionnaires français et pour compte de la Cour de Hué. Au Tonkin, les Résidents centraliseront avec le concours des Quan-Bo le service du même impôt, dont ils surveilleront la perception et l'emploi. Une commission composée de commissaires français et annamites déterminera les sommes qui devront être affectées aux diverses branches de l'administration et aux services publics. Le reliquat sera versé dans les caisses de la Cour de Hué.

Art. 12. Dans tout le royaume, les douanes réorganisées seront entièrement confiées à des administrateurs français. Il n’y aura que des douanes maritimes et de frontières placées partout où le besoin se fera sentir. Aucune réclamation ne sera admise en matières de douanes, au sujet dés mesures prises jusqu’à ce jour par les autorités militaires. Les lois et les règlements concernant les contributions indirectes, le régime et le tarif des douanes, et le régime sanitaire de la Cochinchine seront applicables aux territoires de l'Annam et du Tonkin.

Art. 13. Les citoyens ou protégés français pourront, dans toute l'étendue du Tonkin et dans les ports ouverts de l'Annam, circuler librement, faire le commerce, acquérir des biens meubles et immeubles et en disposer. S. M. le Roi d'Annam confirme expressément les garanties stipulées par le traité du 15 mars 1874 en faveur des missionnaires et des chrétiens.

Art. 14. Les personnes qui voudront voyager dans l'intérieur de l'Annam ne pourront en obtenir l'autorisation que par l'intermédiaire du Résident général à Hué ou du Gouverneur de la Cochinchine. Ces autorités leur délivreront des passeports qui seront présentés au visa du Gouvernement annamite.

Art. 15. La France s’engage à garantir désormais l'intégrité des États de S. M. le Roi d'Annam, à défendre ce Souverain contre les agressions du dehors, et contre les rébellions du dedans. A cet effet, l'autorité française pourra faire occuper militairement sur le territoire de l'Annam et du Tonkin les points qu’elle jugera nécessaires pour assurer l'exercice du protectorat.

Art. 16. S. M. le Roi d'Annam continuera, comme par le passé, à diriger l'administration intérieure de ses États, sauf les restrictions qui résultent de la présente convention.

Art. 17. Les dettes actuelles de l'Annam vis-à-vis de la France seront acquittées au moyen de paiements dont le mode sera ultérieurement déterminé. S. M. le Roi d'Annam s’interdit de contracter aucun emprunt à l'étranger sans l'autorisation du Gouvernement français.

Art. 18. Des conférences régleront les limites des ports ouverts et des concessions françaises dans chacun de ces ports, l'établissement des phares sur les côtes de l'Annam et du Tonkin, le régime et l'exploitation des mines, le régime monétaire, la quotité à attribuer au Gouvernement annamite sur les produits des douanes, des régles, des taxes télégraphiques et autres revenus non visés dans l'article 11 du présent traité. La présente convention sera soumise à l'approbation du Gouvernement de la République française et de S. M. le Roi d'Annam, et les ratifications en seront échangées aussitôt que possible.

Art. 19. Le présent traité remplacera les conventions des 15 mars, 31 août et 23 novembre 1874.

En cas de contestation le texte français fera seul foi.

== Text of the treaty (English translation) ==
Article 1. Annam recognises and accepts the protectorate of France. France will represent Annam in all her external relations. Annamese abroad will be placed under the protection of France.

Article 2. A French military force will occupy Thuận An on a permanent basis. All the forts and military installations along the Huế River will be razed.

Article 3. Annamese officials will continue to administer the provinces lying between the frontier of Cochinchina and the frontier of the province of Ninh Bình, except for the customs and public works and, in general, any services that require the sole direction or the employment of European engineers or agents.

Article 4. Within the limits indicated above, the Annamese government will declare the ports of Tourane and Xuan Day open to trade with all nations, as well as that of Qui Nhơn. Other ports may also be opened at a later date by mutual agreement. The French government will maintain in these ports agents placed under the orders of its Resident at Huế.

Article 5. A Resident General, representing the French Government, will oversee the external relations of Annam and ensure the smooth functioning of the protectorate, while not interfering in the local administration of the provinces comprised within the limits set by Article 3. He will reside in the citadel of Huế with a military escort. The Resident General will be entitled to a right of private and personal audience with His Majesty the King of Annam.

Article 6. Residents or Deputy Residents will be placed by the Government of the Republic in the chief towns of Tonkin, where their presence is felt to be useful. They will be under the orders of the Resident General. They will live in the citadel and, where such is the case, in the enclosure reserved for the mandarin. If necessary, they will be provided with a French or native escort.

Article 7. The Residents shall refrain from interfering in the details of the administration of the provinces. Native officials at all levels will continue to govern and administer them, subject to their control, but will be recalled if so required by the French authorities.

Article 8. French officials and employees of all kinds shall only communicate with the Annamese authorities via the Residents.

Article 9. A telegraph line shall be laid from Saigon to Hanoi and operated by French employees. Part of the taxes shall be remitted to the Annamese government, which will in return surrender the land necessary for the telegraph stations.

Article 10. Both in Annam and in Tonkin, foreigners of all nationalities shall be placed under French jurisdiction. The French authorities shall determine disputes of any kind that may arise between Annamese and foreigners or solely among foreigners.

Article 11. Within Annam strictly defined, the quan bo will collect the traditional taxes without the oversight of French officials and for the account of the Court of Huế. In Tonkin, the Residents will oversee the collection of this tax. They will assisted by the quan bo, and will supervise their employment and collection methods. A commission composed of French and Annamese commissioners will determine the amount of money to be assigned to the various government departments and for public services. The remainder will be deposited in the coffers of the Court of Huế.

Article 12. The customs regime will be reorganised throughout the realm and entrusted entirely to French administrators. Customs posts shall only be established along the coast and on the frontiers, and shall be located wherever they are needed. No complaints against rulings previously made by the military authorities on customs matters shall be entertained. The laws and regulations of Cochinchina covering indirect contributions, the customs regime, the scale of tariffs and sanitary precautions shall also be applied throughout the territories of Annam and Tonkin.

Article 13. French citizens and persons under French protection may travel freely, engage in commerce, and acquire and dispose of moveable and immoveable property anywhere within the borders of Tonkin and in the open ports of Annam. His Majesty the King of Annam expressly confirms the guarantees stipulated by the treaty of 15 March 1874 in respect of missionaries and Christians.

Article 14. Persons who wish to travel in the interior of Annam must obtain authorisation for their journey either through the Resident General at Huế or from the governor of Cochinchina. These authorities shall supply them with passports, which must be presented for a visa from the Annamese government.

Article 15. France undertakes to guarantee henceforth the integrity of the realms of His Majesty the King of Annam, and to defend this Sovereign against all external aggression and internal rebellion. To this effect, the French authorities may station troops at whatever points in the territory of Annam and Tonkin they judge necessary for the effective functioning of the protectorate.

Article 16. As in the past, His Majesty the King of Annam will continue to direct the internal administration of his realms, except where restricted by the provisions of this present convention.

Article 17. Annam's outstanding debts to France shall be paid off in a manner subsequently to be determined. His Majesty the King of Annam shall refrain from contracting any foreign loan except with the approval of the French government.

Article 18. Talks will be held to determine the limits of the open ports and of the French concessions in each of these ports, locations for the construction of lighthouses on the coasts of Annam and Tonkin, arrangements for the exploitation of the mines, the monetary system, and the portion of the profits accruing from the customs, the regulations, taxes on telegraphic cables and other revenues not specified in Article 11 of this treaty. This convention shall be submitted for the approval of the Government of the French Republic and His Majesty the King of Annam, and ratifications shall be exchanged as soon as possible.

Article 19. The present treaty will replace the conventions of 15 March, 31 August and 23 November 1874.

In the event of a dispute, the French text shall prevail.

== See also ==
- Sino-French War
- Imperialism in Asia
