= Tự Đức =

4th Emperor of Nguyễn-dynasty Vietnam (r. 1847–1883)

Emperor Tự Đức 嗣德帝
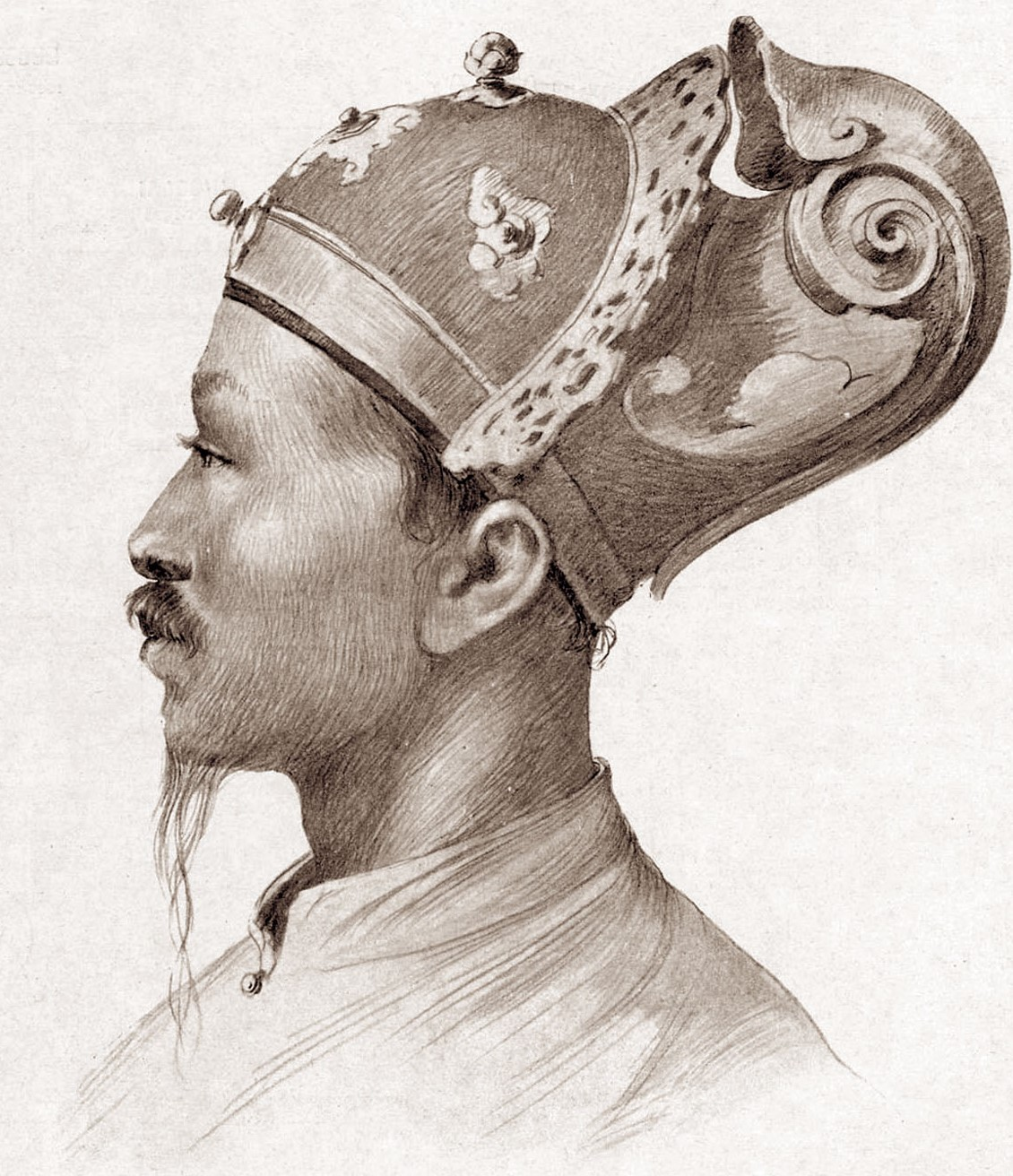
- Portrait by L.Ruffier

Emperor of Đại Nam
- Reign: 5 November 1847 – 19 July 1883
- Predecessor: Thiệu Trị
- Successor: Dục Đức

Emperor of the Nguyễn dynasty
- Reign: 5 November 1847 – 19 July 1883
- Predecessor: Thiệu Trị
- Successor: Dục Đức
- Born: 22 September 1829; Imperial City, Huế, Đại Nam
- Died: 19 July 1883 (aged 53); Càn Thành hall (乾成殿), Imperial City, Huế, Đại Nam
- Burial: Khiêm Lăng
- Spouse: Empress Trang Ý Nguyễn Thị Bích more than 300 concubines
- Issue: None (childless); Nguyễn Phúc Ưng Ái (adoptive); Nguyễn Phúc Ưng Kỷ (adoptive); Nguyễn Phúc Ưng Đăng (adoptive)
Names
- Nguyễn Phúc Hồng Nhậm (阮 福 洪 任); Nguyễn Phúc Thì (阮 福 時)
Era name and dates
- Tự Đức (嗣 德): 1847–1883
Posthumous name
- Thể thiên Hanh vận Chí thành Đạt hiếu Thể kiện Đôn nhân Khiêm cung Minh lược Duệ văn Anh Hoàng đế 世天亨運至誠達孝體健敦仁謙恭明略睿文英皇帝
Temple name
- Dực Tông (翼 宗)
- House: Nguyễn dynasty
- Father: Thiệu Trị
- Mother: Empress Từ Dụ
- Religion: Ruism, Buddhism

Tự Đức (Hanoi: [tɯ̂ ɗɯ́k], chữ Hán: 嗣德, lit. 'inheritance of virtues', 22 September 1829 – 19 July 1883) (personal name: Nguyễn Phúc Hồng Nhậm, also Nguyễn Phúc Thì) was the fourth emperor of the Nguyễn dynasty of Vietnam, and the country's last pre-colonial monarch. Ruling for about 36 years from 1847 to 1883, this made him the longest reigning Nguyễn emperor.

== Biography ==
Prince Nguyễn Phúc Hồng Nhậm was born on 22 September 1829. He was a son of the emperor Thiệu Trị and succeeded his father as emperor of Vietnam in 1847 as Tự Đức. Family troubles, however, plagued the beginning of his reign. Thiệu Trị had passed over his more moderate eldest son Hồng Bảo, in favour of Tự Đức, known for his staunch Confucianism and opposition to foreigners and innovation. As a result and due to the repressive policies of the previous emperor, there was now a great deal of dissatisfaction with Nguyễn rule and a legitimate royal figure for opposition to rally around.

== Rule ==
=== Cholera and natural disaster ===
In summer 1849, one year after Tu Duc's coronation, a cholera epidemic struck Vietnam and Cambodia. Around 600,000 lost their lives according to the royal archives. Military physician O'neill Barrett (1982) and the Vietnamese Ministry of Health (2007) estimated that a total of two million people had been affected during the pandemic. Historian Christopher Goscha suggests the overall death toll of 800,000.

Unusual heavy rainy seasons were recorded during 1847–1861, followed by a period of extremely dry and severe droughts between 1864 and 1889. Typhoons ravaged Tonkin in 1880–1881. A plague of locusts devastated Sơn Tây and Bắc Ninh provinces in 1854.

=== Conflict with Hồng Bảo and his descendants ===
As the eldest son of Thiệu Trị, Prince Hồng Bảo was resentful of his brother. He plotted rebellion against Tự Đức with a wide range of supporters: Confucians who were angered that Hồng Bảo as the eldest son had been passed over in favour of Tự Đức, Lê dynasty supporters, corrupt mandarins, Catholic missionaries and Christian converts who had been persecuted by Minh Mạng and Thiệu Trị, and peasants disgruntled with Nguyễn taxation. He never had the chance to rebel however, as he was arrested in 1854 and scheduled to be executed. The dowager empress Từ Dụ advised him against it, and Hồng Bảo killed himself in prison. He was buried simply without a funeral.

In 1866, Hồng Bảo's son Đinh Đạo rebelled against Tự Đức. The rebellion was crushed and Tự Đức ordered Đinh Đạo, his brothers and his mother to be put to death.

=== Religious suppression ===
Emperor Tự Đức continued the policies of his predecessors, shutting Vietnam off from the outside world and refusing all efforts to modernize the country. Accounts of his personal life show a gentle and educated man, but his policies brought on conflict with Europe that Vietnam could not win. He oppressed all foreigners in Vietnam, especially the Christian community, who had tried to overthrow his grandfather, such as in the Lê Văn Khôi revolt, calling their religion a "perverse doctrine". The Christian mandarin Nguyễn Trường Tộ tried to convince Tự Đức that this was a suicidal policy, but he did not listen, confident that France was too involved with the chaos in Europe in 1848 to respond, but he was mistaken.

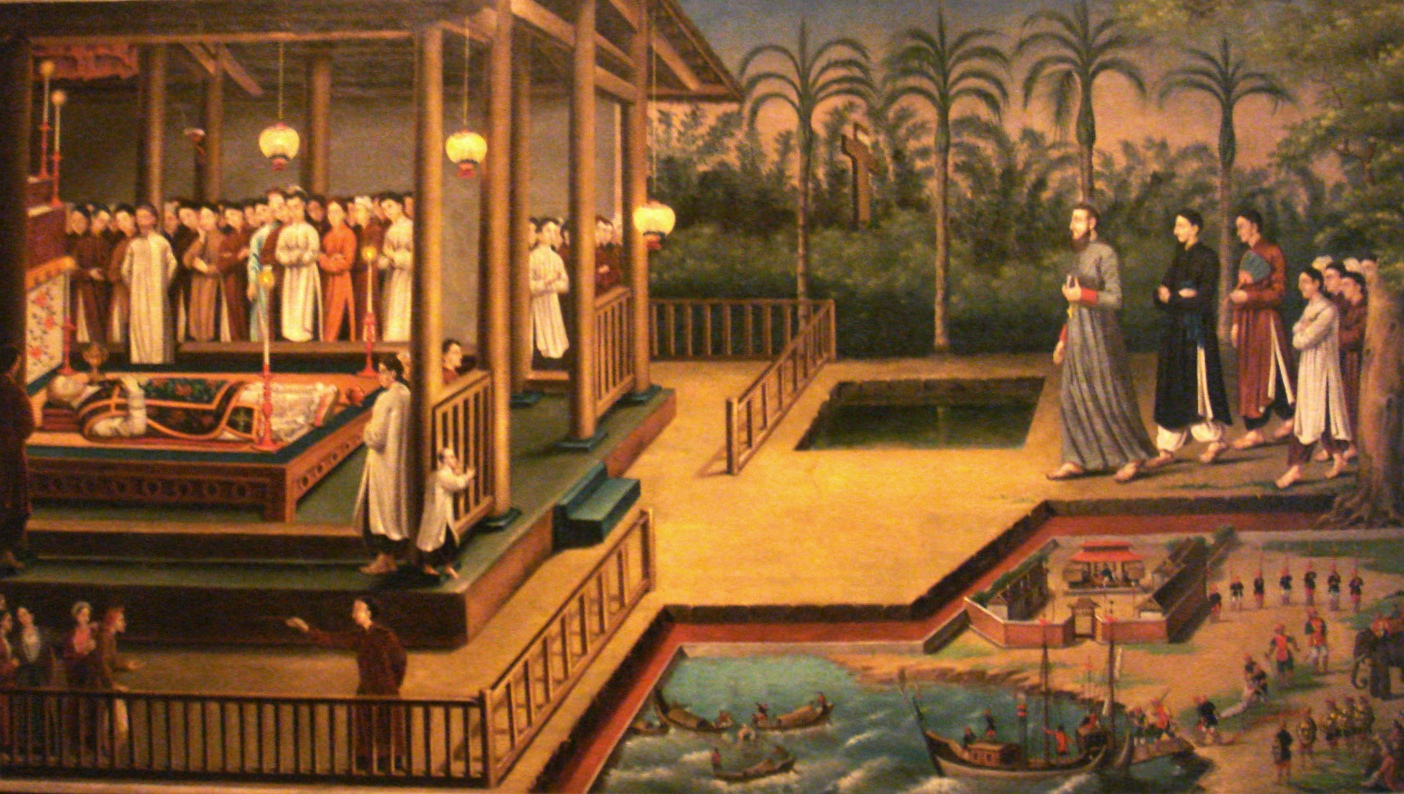
Death ceremony of Jean-Louis Bonnard. The lower right corner shows his body being cast in the water, where he was retrieved by Christians. In the upper right corner, Mgr Retord comes to the ceremony.

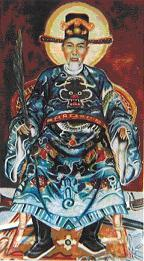
Portrait of Michael Hồ Đình Hy, Vietnamese mandarin official who was martyred for his Roman Catholic beliefs

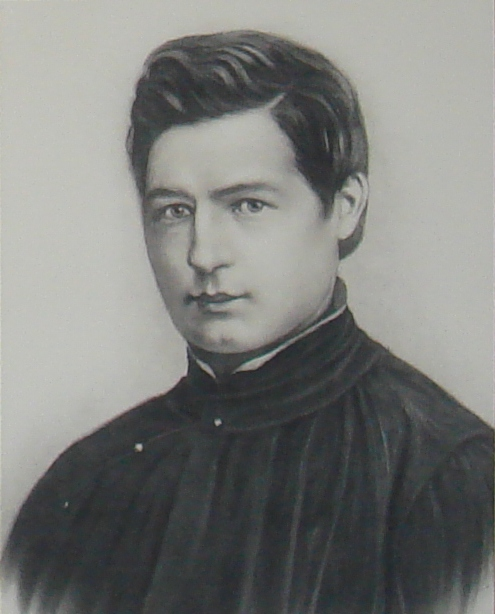
Théophane Vénard, French Catholic missionary was executed by Tự Đức on 2 February 1861

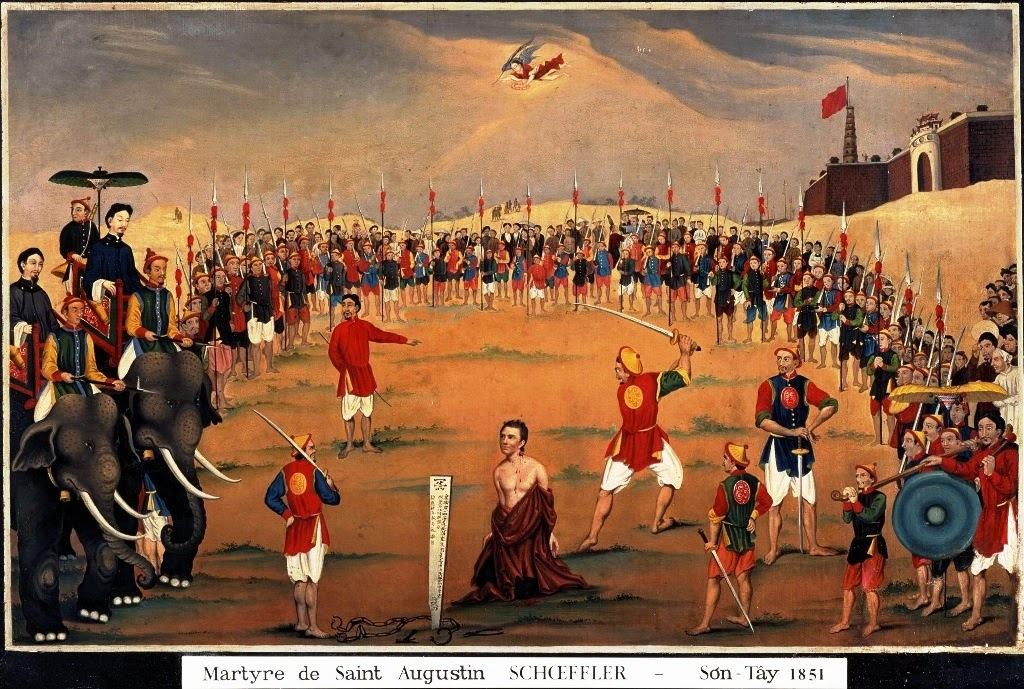
Martyrdom of Augustin Schoeffler at Sơn Tây

=== Attempts at reforms ===
It was quite ironic that even during the height of Tu Duc's persecution against Catholic Christians, there were always devout Catholic officials serving in his court, occupied among the high-ranking positions. Among them, Nguyễn Hữu Thơ, an accomplished priest, was sent by Tu Duc to France with another French priest, to plan the creation of a school of "Sciences, and Arts and Crafts" in Hue, but later that project was defied by Tu Duc himself who quickly lost interest in reforms. Another Catholic official, Nguyễn Trường Tộ, had attempted forty-three times to persuade the court of Tu Duc to renovate the kingdom and adopt the changing global order. In 1866 he was sent to Europe on the Vietnamese third mission to recruit technicians and teachers for a Western-style school foundation in Vietnam, but that project was also cancelled in 1867 when France annexed the rest of Cochinchina.

Nguyễn Trường Tộ launched a campaign against the established-Confucian education and thinking in Vietnam. He denounced Confucianism "the evil that has been brought on China and on our country by the Confucian way of life." Concluding "No other country in the world has so irrational a system of education," Nguyễn Trường Tộ advocated for a new, modernized education system followed the European model. Indeed, neither of his proposals was applied.

In 2018 Lê Minh Khải claimed that he found two instances where the Tự Đức Emperor had ordered the Chinese edition of several classic books on science and industry from the West to be read by the mandarins and soldiers of the country. As an example he mentioned the book "Vạn Quốc Công Pháp" (萬國公法), a Chinese translation of The Elements of International Law, first published in 1836 by American lawyer Henry Wheaton, a book noted by many researchers to have made a profound contribution to the ideological transformation of the ruling elites in Qing China and Japan. It is noted that the very slow adoption of the ideas from this work in the Nguyễn dynasty showed how slowly its elites adopted Western ideas and despite learning about Western ideas they proved to be unable or unwilling adopt them or adapt to them.

=== Invasions by foreign rebels and mercenaries ===
Northern Vietnam (known as Tonkin by Europeans), had been ravaged by constant cholera epidemic, natural disasters, and famines in the 1840s–1850s, was left barely administrated by the court. The mountainous parts of Tonkin were territories of mainly indigenous Tai-speaking communities, and later Hmong, who were autonomous and lightly submissive in relations with the court of Hue. Rebellion and pirate activities increased. In 1857, Chinese Muslim rebels from Yunnan attacked and occupied areas near Tụ Long mines, Tuyên Quang. Tụ Long was an important mining zone for the Vietnamese economy which depended on copper coins in every transaction.

In 1860, the Chinese Muslim rebels were driven back, but the new White Flag army invaded Tonkin and laid Tụ Long abandoned by 1863, disrupting Vietnamese finance and the opium trade. Threats from the White Flags mounted as violence and anarchy escalated. In 1862, Tu Duc appointed Nguyễn Bá Nghi to fought off the White Flag rebels. The White Flags made a series of devastating raids in Hưng Hóa, Cao Bằng, Thái Nguyên, and lowland Red River Delta, made local governments there dysfunctional. In summer 1865, the White Flags ambushed Vietnamese troops at Tuyên Quang, killing three hundred soldiers. In February 1868, the White Flags seized Lục Yên and chased the Vietnamese away. Unable to defeat the White Flags in conventional warfare, the Vietnamese began to hire Chinese and Tai-Zhuang mercenaries. In 1860, He Junchang, a Chinese opium merchant, had recruited his own personal militia to protect the opium trade from the White Flags. His private army effectively drove the White Flags away from Lào Cai, the main station along Kunming-Hanoi opium trade route.

Liu Yongfu proclaimed the Kingdom of Yanling in Guangxi in 1861. In 1865, after the fall of the Taiping Heavenly Kingdom, Liu Yongfu fled to China-Vietnam borders and founded the Black Flag Army, consisting of Chinese and Tai-Zhuang militia. The Vietnamese immediately made an alliance with the Black Flags to fight against the White Flags. In 1868, war in Tonkin broke out between the White Flags and the Black Flags, resulting in White Flags defeat and their forces diminished. The Vietnamese now were harboring the Black Flags and benefiting from their good fighting and reputations.

New waves of Chinese rebels invaded Vietnam in form of the Yellow Flag Army, led by Wu Yazhong and later his lieutenant Pan Lunsi. In March 1868, thousands of Yellow Flags crossed the borders and attacking local Vietnamese authorities and raiding grain warehouses in Cao Bằng. The Yellow Flags occupied large territories in Tonkin, and continued their operations until 1885.

=== European conquest ===
France and Spain responded to Tự Đức's persecution with a large military expeditionary force and attacked up from southern Vietnam in 1858–1862. The Nguyễn army fought bravely for some time, but their antiquated weapons and tactics were no match for the French, who suffered more from the climate and disease than from enemy resistance. The fighting around Hanoi against the Black Flag pirates in the 1880s ended with France victorious and the Qing Empire gave up its supremacy over Vietnam and recognized France as the ruling power over the region.

=== Rebellions ===
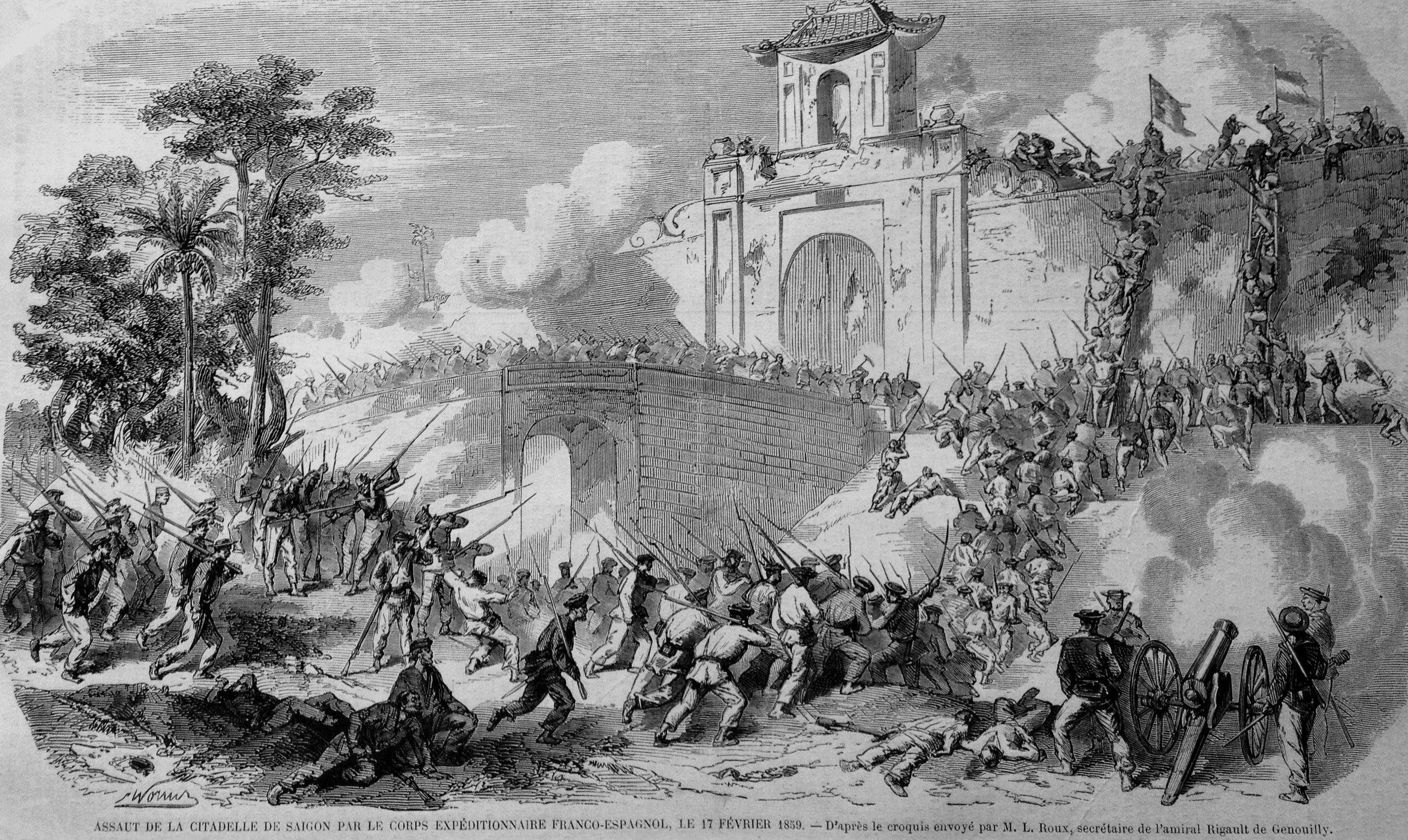
French and Spanish force capture of Saigon in 1859

To make matters worse, Emperor Tự Đức had to deal with renewed internal rebellions which had become commonplace for the Nguyễn dynasty. There were literally hundreds of small rebellions and uprisings against Nguyễn rule. Ineffective attempts to enforce the ban on Christian missionaries were also the biggest source of trouble, including the execution of a Spanish bishop which was used to justify the French and Spanish invasion that led to the fall of Saigon. By an order of 1848 Tự Đức commanded all Vietnamese Catholic converts to renounce their religion, otherwise they would be branded on the face with the mark of a heretic and surrender all of their rights and privileges. This rallied most of the European powers against Vietnam, and Tự Đức by doing this had given up any hope of Vietnam gaining help as a victim from the outside world.

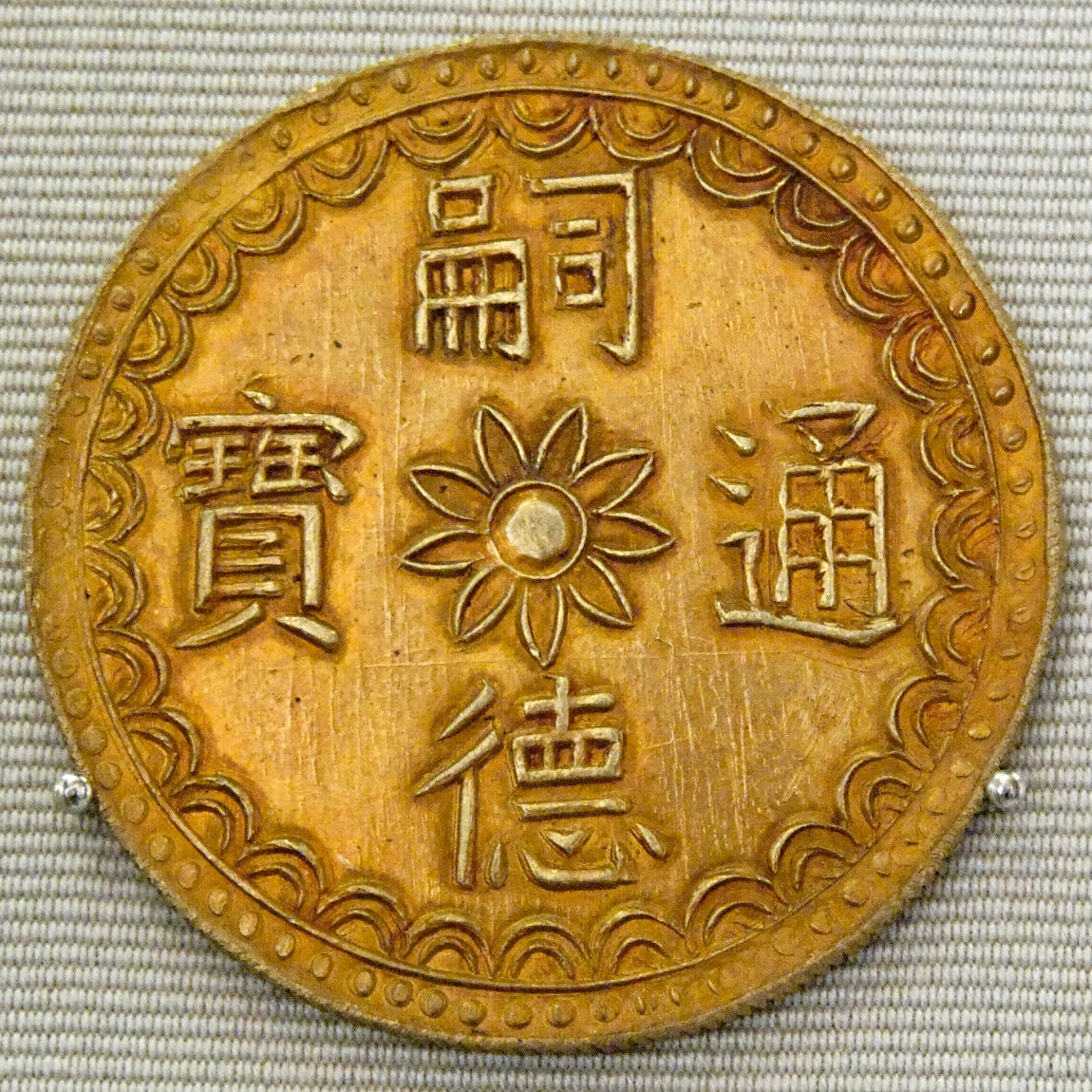
Gold lạng (Tael) of Tự Đức

=== Final years ===
When further rebellions broke out as the French were advancing on the capital, Tự Đức feared that his authority was crumbling. He preferred to make a deal with the French so that he could crush the rebellion since while France may demand humiliating concessions, the rebels would most likely depose and/or kill him. He signed away the southernmost of Vietnam, Cochinchina, to be a French colony and accepted the status of a French protectorate for his country. This caused a huge uproar, and many, such as the famous mandarin Trương Định, refused to recognize the treaty and fought on in defense of their country, denouncing Tự Đức for surrendering any part of their homeland.

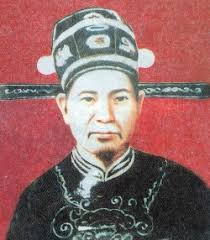
Hoàng Diệu, who was the viceroy of Hanoi, committed suicide in 1882 after his defensive failure in Battle of Hanoi to France

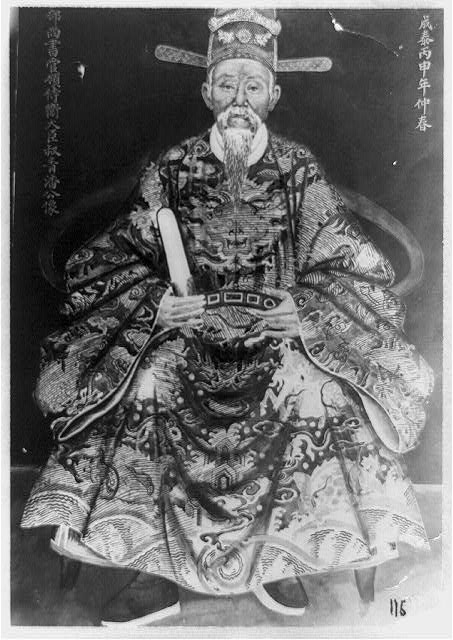
Phan Liêm, son of Phan Thanh Giản was captured by French colonel Francis Garnier in 1873 and released in 1874 after peace treaty

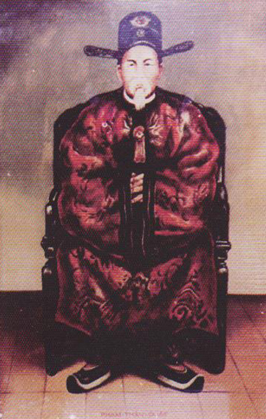
Phạm Thận Duật who signed the Treaty of Huế (1884) and later he joined the anti-French resistance. He was the private tutor of future emperor Dục Đức and Đồng Khánh.

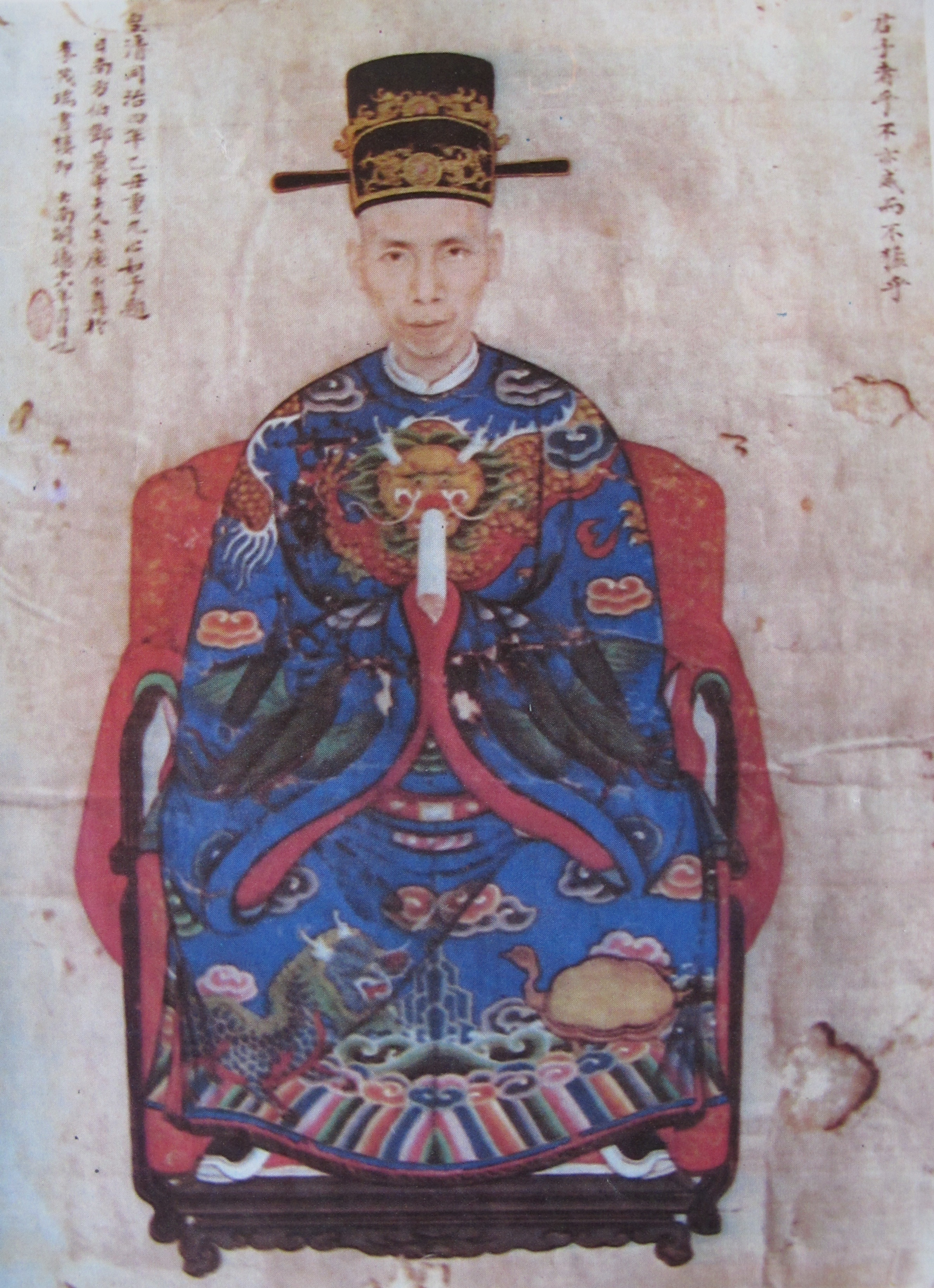
Đặng Huy Trứ, the reformist and the known for introduction of photography and western-model shipbuilding into Vietnam

After the 1873 Tonkin incident, Third French Republic governor of Cochinchina Marie Jules Dupré and the Hue court official Nguyễn Văn Tường signed treaty of Saigon (1874), concluding Vietnam as a vassal of France but allowing Vietnam's status quo in foreign relationships. But in 1876 Tu Duc sent a delegation to Beijing, reassessing Vietnam's tributary status for the Chinese Empire. Another Vietnamese mission in 1880 went on to pay homage to the Qing court. On 10 November 1880, the Chinese ambassador in Paris announced that Dai Nam was still a vassal of China and rejected the Franco-Vietnamese treaty of 1874. In the next year, the Qing sent an envoy to Vietnam to negotiate trade relationship.

Siam and Vietnam renewed their relationship in 1878. In 1880, Tu Duc welcomed an Italian trade delegation. Frustrated of being harassed by Tu Duc, Résident‐supérieur Rheinart France retaliated by barring Vietnam from joining the Paris International Fair, and from sending envoy to congratulate President Jules Grévy's inauguration.

By September 1882, more than 200,000 Chinese troops had been sent to Northern Vietnam (Tonkin) following Tu Duc's request of aid fighting against new French incursion.

== Death ==
Emperor Tự Đức did not live to see the worst effects of colonialism on his country, and he was also the last Vietnamese monarch to rule independently. A case of smallpox left him impotent so he had no children despite a huge harem of wives he kept in his palace. He died in 1883 and, according to legend, cursed the French with his dying breath. His adopted son, Dục Đức, succeeded him but was deposed by court officials after a reign of three days.

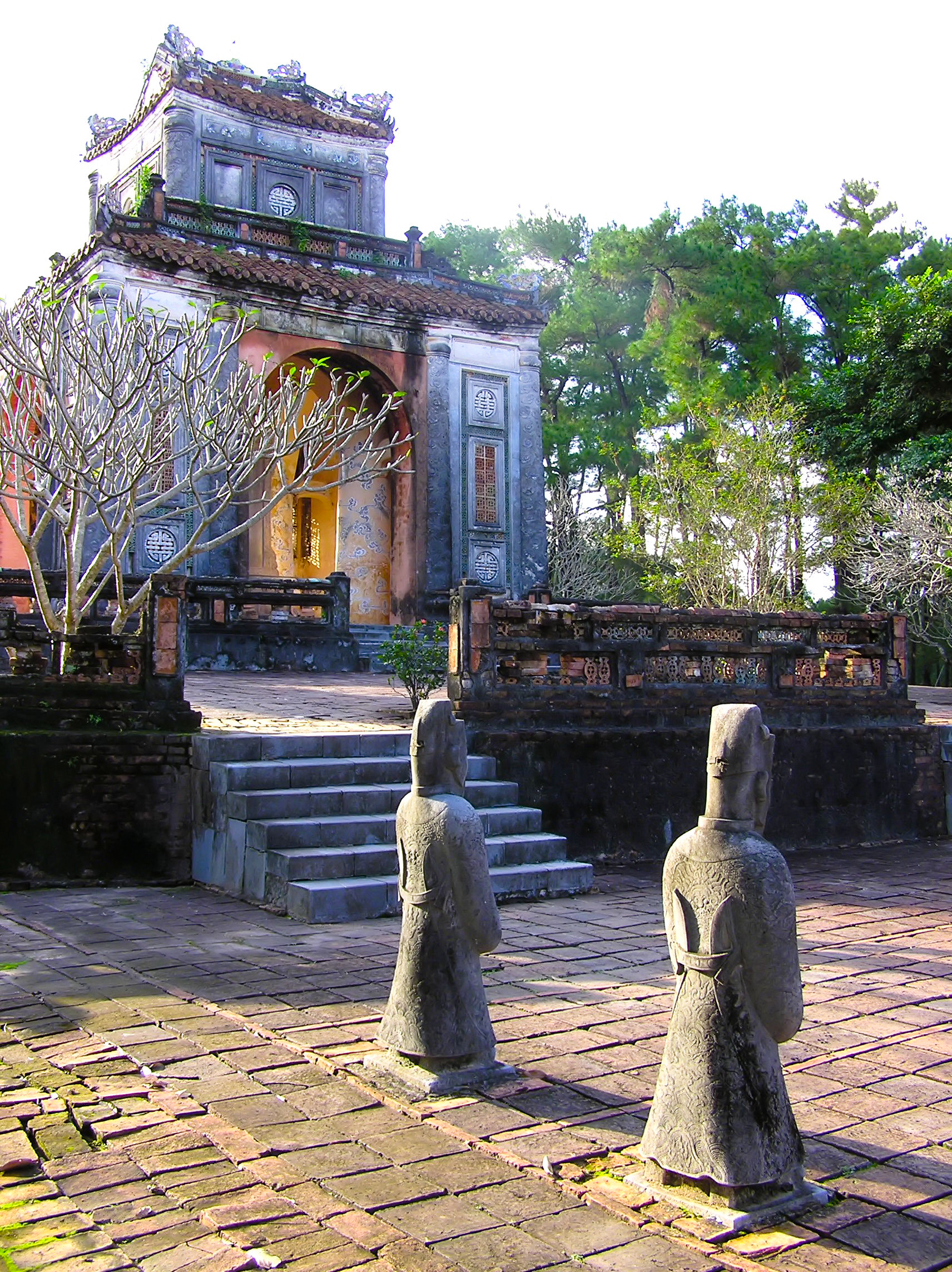
Pavilion east of the tomb

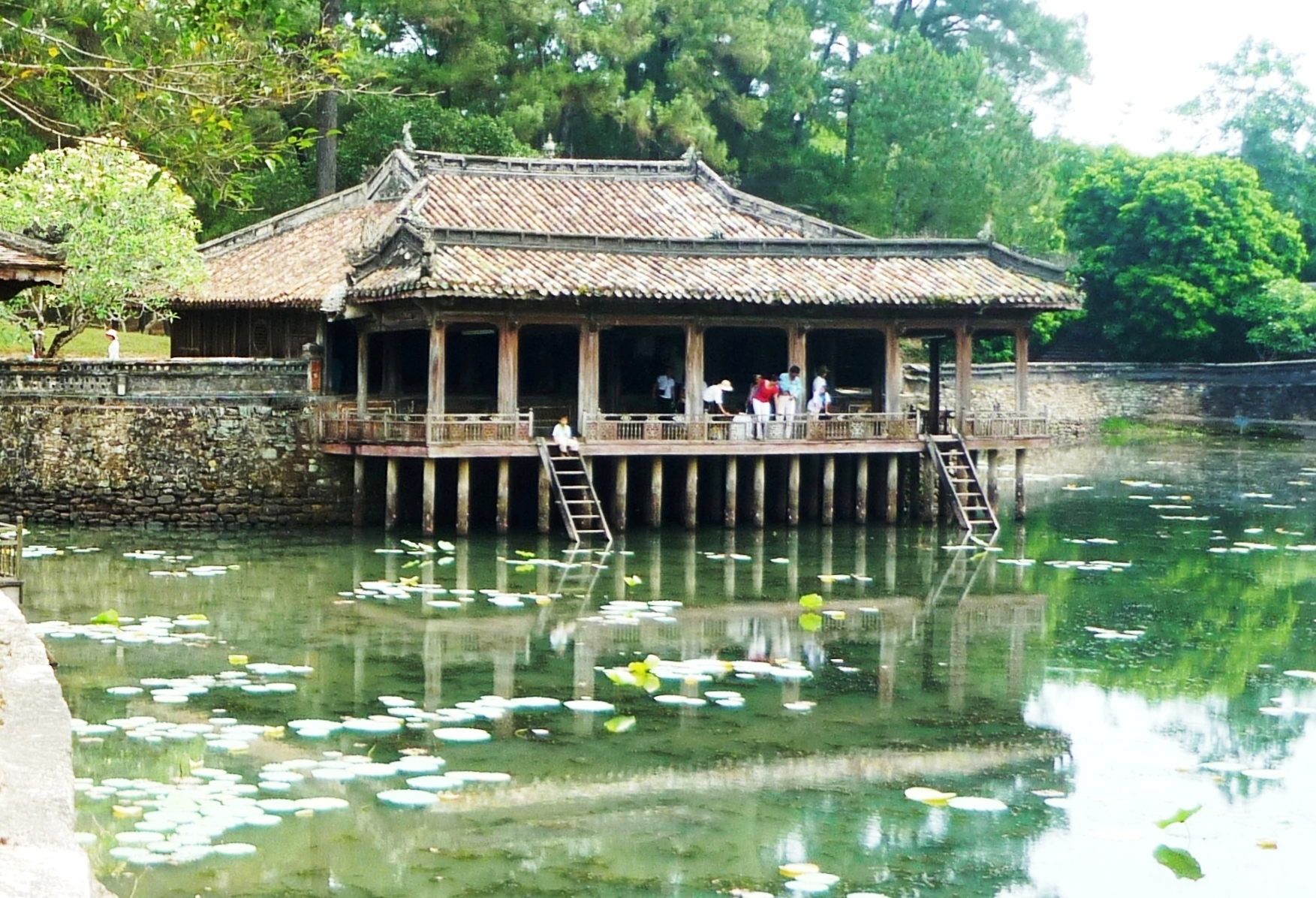
Pavillon and lotus pond

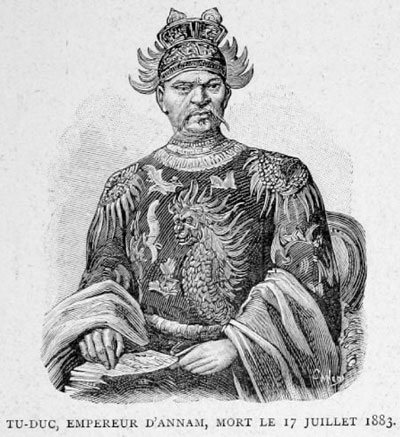
Portrait of Emperor Tu Duc in 1883

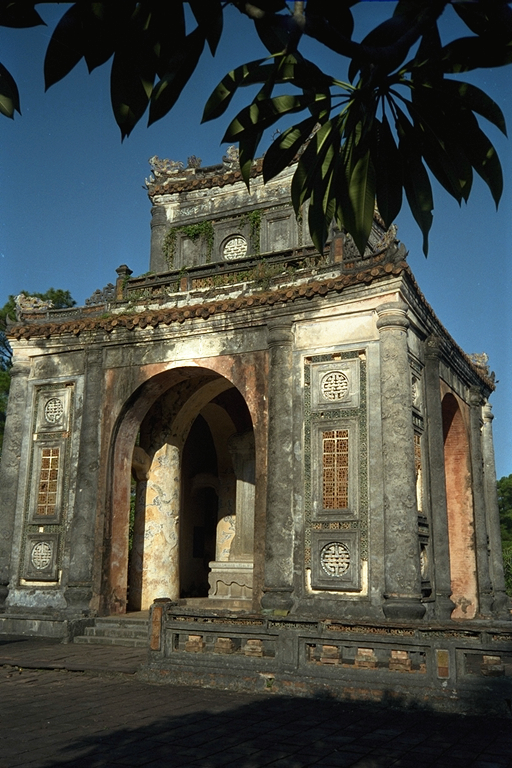
Pavilion east of the tomb

== Family ==
| Rank | Title | Name | Date of birth–death | Note |
|---|---|---|---|---|
| Consort Trung | Palace lady Second rank Consort Cần First rank Consort Thuần/Trung The imperial noble consort (the same as The empress of Nguyễn dynasty) Empress Khiêm Empress dowager Trang Ý Grand Empress dowager Trang Ý Empress Lệ Thiên Anh (Lệ Thiên Anh Hoàng hậu- 儷天英皇后) | Võ Thị Duyên | 1828–1903 | |
| Consort Thiện | Palace lady Second rank consort Chiêu First rank Consort Thiện | Nguyễn Thị Cẩm | | |
| Consort Học | Palace lady Fourth rank concubine Lượng Second rank consort Khiêm First rank consort Học The imperial consort dowager (the title of the emperor's mother but not the empress of the former emperor) | Nguyễn Thị Hương | | |
| Concubine Mẫn | Palace lady Third rank Concubine Thận Second rank Consort Cung Third rank concubine Mẫn | From Lê family | | |
| Concubine Lễ | Ninth rank lady Eighth rank lady Seventh rank lady Sixth rank lady Third rank concubine Lễ | Nguyễn Nhược Thị Bích | 1830–1909 | |
| Concubine Thận | Third rank concubine Thận | From Hồ family | | |
| Concubine Kiệm | Fourth rank concubine Kiệm | From Bùi family | ?–1893 | |
| Concubine Tín | Fifth rank concubine Tín | From Nguyễn Thanh family | | |
| Lady | Sixth rank lady | From Nguyễn Trinh family | | |
| Lady | Eighth rank lady | From Nguyễn Đình family | | |
| Lady | Ninth rank lady | From Nguyễn Nhược family | | Concubine Lễ's sister |
| Lady | Ninth rank lady | Trương Thị Ân | | |
| Lady | Ninth rank lady | From Lê Family | | |
And more with no informations

== See also ==
- Tự Đức Thông Bảo
- Tự Đức Bảo Sao

| Preceded by Emperor Thiệu Trị | Nguyễn dynasty | Succeeded by Emperor Dục Đức |
