= Phạm Thận Duật =

19th-century bureaucrat and diplomat in Nguyễn-dynasty Vietnam

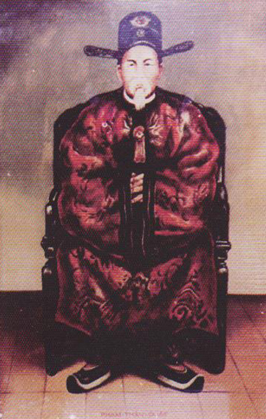
Portrait of Phạm Thận Duật

Phạm Thận Duật (chữ Hán: 范慎遹, 1825–1885) was a high-ranking mandarin serving in the Nguyễn dynasty of Vietnam. He and Tôn Thất Phan, representing emperor Tự Đức's court, signed the Treaty of Huế with France. He participated in the anti-colonial Cần Vương resistance and died while being sent to exile in Tahiti by the French. Knowledge of his role in the resistance was hidden or lost for many decades after his death; he was thought to have been a French collaborator for having signed the treaty.

He was also a celebrated historian who was in charge of the National History Institute (Quốc Sử Quán) and the Imperial College (Quốc Tử Giám). He was the final editor of The Imperially Ordered Annotated Text Completely Reflecting the History of Vietnam, a Chinese-language history of Vietnam commissioned by the emperor Tự Đức, and the mentor of future emperors Dục Đức and Đồng Khánh. There is now a prize for doctoral theses in History named after him, the Phạm Thận Duật Award.

== Early life ==
Phạm Thận Duật (courtesy names Quan Thành and Vọng Sơn, the latter named after a mountain in his hometown Ninh Bình) was born in Yên Mô Thượng village, Yên Mạc county, Yên Mô district, Ninh Bình, on November 3, 1825, during emperor Minh Mạng's rule. His family were poor farmers who aspired to education for their children. At the age of nine, he began studying Confucianism with Vũ Phạm Khải in a neighbor village, but it lasted only a few days before Vũ Phạm Khải went to Huế to assume a government post. Phạm Thận Duật then became a student of his uncle, Nguyễn Hữu Văn, and afterwards studied under Phạm Tư Tề, a teacher from the same village who had opened a school in Nam Định. Four years later, he returned home to study under scholar Phạm Đức Diệu in Yên Mô district who later became his father-in-law. Realizing Duật's potential, Phạm Đức Diệu recommended Duật to his close friend Phạm Văn Nghị, a retired mandarin who was staunchly anti-colonialist.

== Imperial court career ==
In 1850, Phạm Thận Duật passed the provincial exam, and took the court exam in Huế the year after but did not advance further. Still, he was appointed as an official serving the Nguyễn dynasty during emperor Tự Đức's rule. Initially, he was the Prefecture Educational Commissioner of Đoan Hùng county, then promoted to Prefect of Tuần Giáo. During this period, he composed the Hưng Hóa Gazettes under the name Quan Thành. In 1857, he was appointed Prefect of Quế Dương, and then Prefect of Lạng Giang. Afterwards he was promoted as a province official, holding posts such as Plantation Commissioner, Surveillance Commissioner, Administration Commissioner, and ultimately Governor of Bắc Ninh.

In 1870–1871, Phạm Thận Duật took part in the campaign to neutralize bandits at the midlands border. In 1873, when the French, led by Francis Garnier, attacked the Hanoi citadel (see Conquest of Cochinchina), he was designated to govern Tonkin's provinces and appoint temporary government officials, becoming Patrol of Hà Nội. In 1874, he was appointed Patrol of Bắc Ninh, executing a successful campaign to eliminate bandits in the north. In 1875, he became the assistant to Tôn Thất Thuyết, responsible for the administration of two provinces, Bắc Ninh and Thái Nguyên.

In 1876, Phạm Thận Duật was summoned to Huế to become Advisor of the Ministry of Personnel, as well as Vice Chief Officer of the Censorate. After 4 months, he was sent to the north to be the commissioner overseeing the maintenance of the Red River's floodbank and irrigation. In 1878, he was summoned to the Privy Council to become the mentor for emperor Tự Đức's princes Dục Đức and Chánh Mông. Subsequently, he was put in charge of the National History Institute and the Imperial College. He was appointed principal editor of The Imperially Ordered Annotated Text Completely Reflecting the History of Vietnam by emperor Tự Đức in 1884.

== Treaty of Huế and the Cần Vương movement ==
Before the second French attack of Tonkin in 1882 (part of the Tonkin Campaign), Phạm Thận Duật had issued a secret report to the Huế court, laying out defensive measures against the enemy. He advocated for the construction of forts in critical mountainous areas, and anti-French military bases in Quảng Bình, Hà Tĩnh, with an especially large-scale one in Tân Sở, Quảng Trị. His plan was approved by the leading officials of the pro-confrontation faction of the court, Tôn Thất Thuyết and Nguyễn Văn Tường.

Phạm Thận Duật headed the Nguyễn dynasty's diplomatic corps to Tientsin, China before the 1883 Tet holiday to discuss a joint resistance campaign against the French, but it proved unsuccessful. In early 1884, he was appointed the Chief General in the signing of the 19-article Treaty of Huế on June 6, 1884, which formed the basis for the protectorates of Annam and Tonkin, and for French colonial rule in Vietnam during the next seven decades. After his death, the Vietnamese public, without knowledge of his role in the resistance, vilified him for this role in the signing of the treaty.

With the Treaty of Huế signed, French forces led by General Henri Roussel de Courcy arrived in Vietnam to take control of the country in mid-1885. de Courcy made demands that seemed to signal to the Vietnamese that his goal was to completely subjugate them: for example, he demanded to walk through the central doors of the palace, which only the Emperor could do. The Vietnamese, led by Phạm's fellow mandarins Tôn Thất Thuyết and Nguyễn Văn Tường, decided to launch a surprise attack against the French in a last-ditch effort for independence. Known as the "Huế ambush", it failed, and France seized the Huế royal palace.

Phạm Thận Duật and other loyal mandarins fled with the young king Hàm Nghi to Tân Sở in Quảng Trị Province (where Phạm had previously advocated for the construction of a military base), and issued an edict calling upon Vietnamese people to rise up and "aid the king" (the English translation of "Cần Vương" is "aid the king"). This edict sparked the Cần Vương resistance, a large-scale insurgency against the French colonialists. The resistance had widespread support and was the strongest resistance the French had encountered since landing on Vietnamese soil in the 17th century. On July 29, 1885, while preparing to cross the sea and organize a resistance campaign in Tonkin, Phạm Thận Duật and his family were captured by the French.

Afterward, Phạm Thận Duật was extradited to Huế. He refused bribery from the French colonialists, instead accepting a jail sentence in Côn Đảo. He was then later sentenced to exile in Tahiti. After 6 days on the ship on his way to Tahiti, suffering from diabetes, he died on October 23, 1885, in Malaysian waters.

== Death and tombstone ==
Legend has it that his body, dressed in white clothing, was put in a bag, and dropped into the ocean. Only after a few years did his relatives and fellow villagers learn of his death; they erected a token tomb in his village to commemorate his life. The tombstone was inscribed by Vũ Kế Xuân telling of his deeds and achievements, but it was buried face down in order to be concealed from the French colonial authorities.

For many years afterwards, because he had signed the Treaty of Huế, Phạm Thận Duật was seen as a French collaborator and a traitor to the Vietnamese. However, in 1975, the tombstone was unearthed and his role as a leader of the resistance was rediscovered. His tombstone was re-erected, celebrating his life and work as a patriotic scholar and staunchly anti-colonialist official in emperor Tự Đức's court.

== Legacy ==
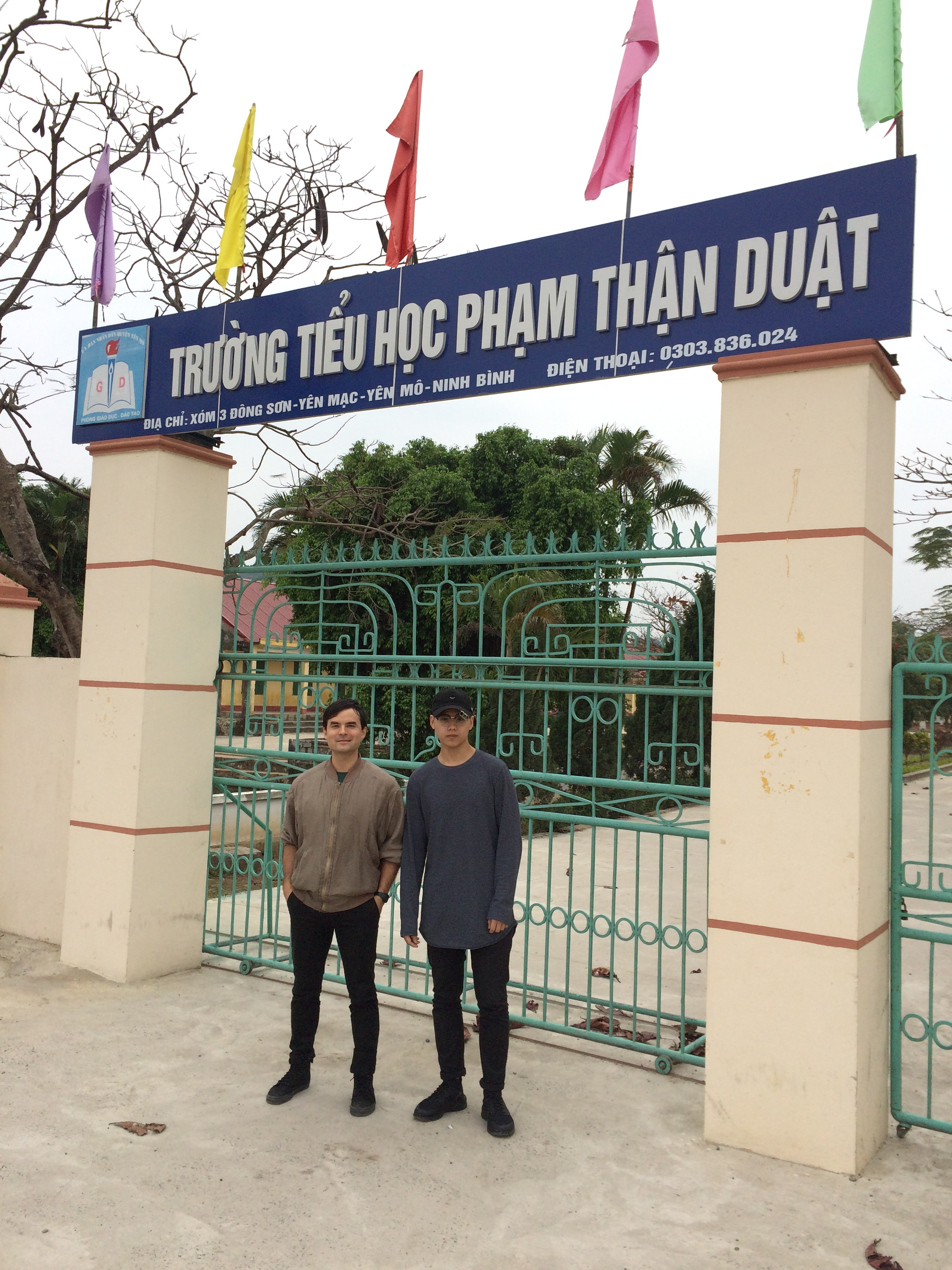
School named after Phạm Thận Duật in Ninh Bình, Vietnam

Many streets in Vietnam are now named in honor of Phạm Thận Duật, including one in Hanoi, another one in District 2, Ho Chi Minh City, and one in downtown Ninh Bình city.

In addition, the Phạm Thận Duật Award is a prestigious prize awarded annually to the most excellent new doctoral theses in History Studies in Vietnam. From 2000 to 2024, the fund has given 125 prizes in total.

== Sources ==
- Lam, Truong Buu (1967). Patterns of Vietnamese Response to Foreign Intervention: 1858–1900. New Haven, Connecticut: Southeast Asia Studies, Yale University.
