= Treaty of Huế (1883) =

Treaty establishing French protectorates in Nguyễn-dynasty Vietnam

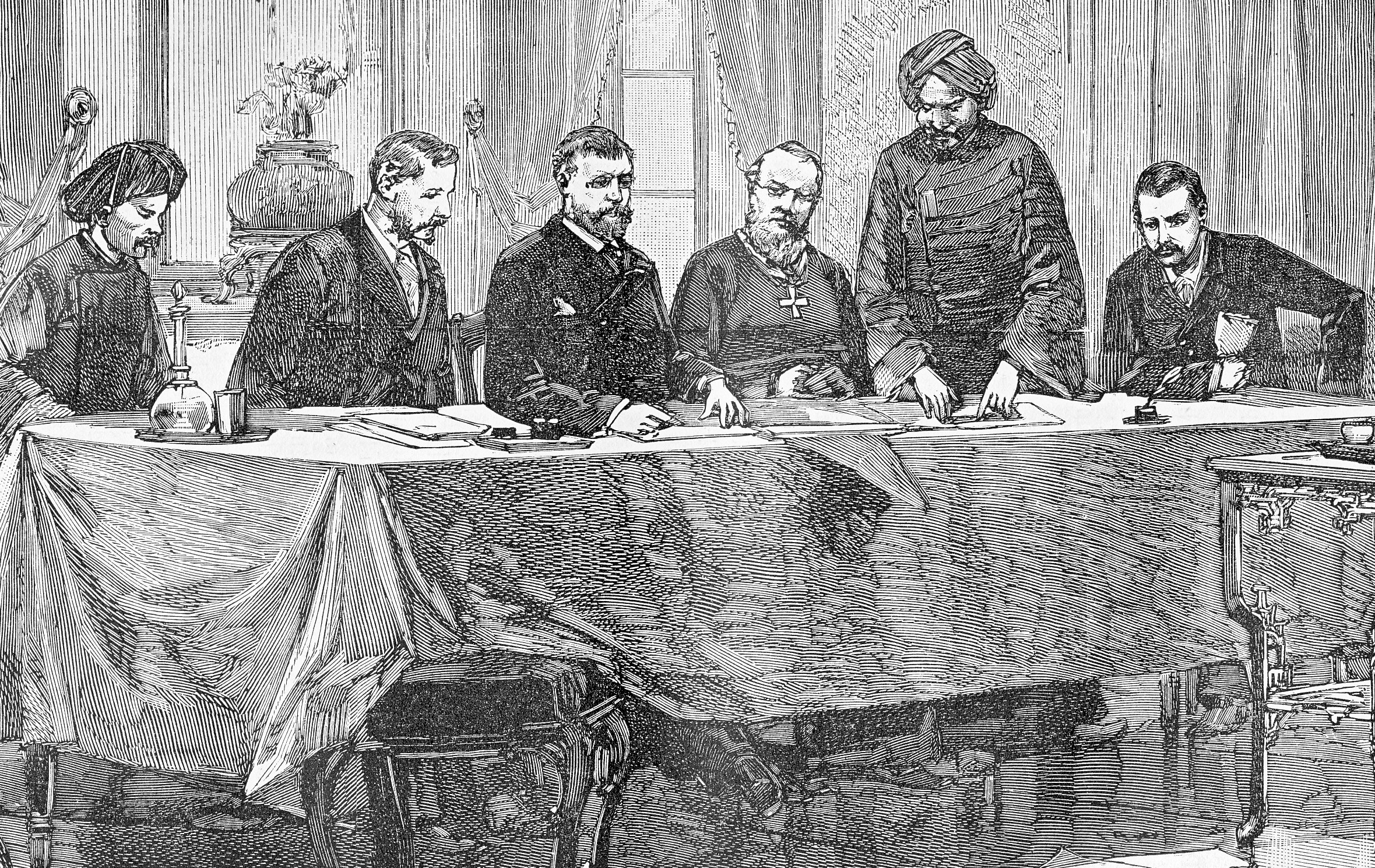
Signature of the Treaty of Huế, 25 August 1883

The Treaty of Huế, (Vietnamese: Hòa ước Harmand, Hòa ước Quý Mùi) concluded on 25 August 1883 between Vietnam (Nguyễn dynasty) and France, recognising a French protectorate over Vietnam being divided into Annam and Tonkin. Dictated to the Vietnamese by the French administrator François-Jules Harmand in the wake of the French military seizure of the Thuận An forts, the treaty is often known as the 'Harmand Treaty'. Considered overly harsh in French diplomatic circles, the treaty was never ratified in France, and was replaced on 6 June 1884 with the slightly milder 'Patenôtre Accords' or 'Treaty of Protectorate', which formed the basis for French rule in Vietnam until the 1949 Élysée Accords signed between France and emperor Bảo Đại.

== Background ==
The treaty was dictated to the Vietnamese in the wake of the French victory at the Battle of Thuận An (20 August 1883) by Jules Harmand, the French civil commissioner-general for Tonkin. The capture of the Thuận An forts exposed Huế to immediate attack and overawed the Vietnamese court. Shortly after the battle, Nguyễn Trọng Hợp, the Vietnamese Minister of personnel, accompanied by Monsignor Gaspar, the French bishop of Huế, concluded a 48-hour armistice with the French. The Nguyễn dynasty agreed to the evacuation of twelve inland forts defending the river, the destruction of their ammunition and the removal of the barrages. Harmand then sailed upriver to Huế aboard a steam launch.

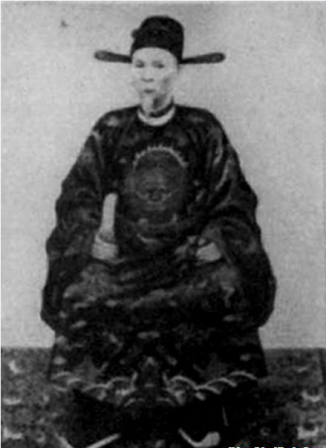
Trần Đình Túc, behalf of Emperor to sign the treaty

At Huế, Harmand presented a brutal ultimatum to the Vietnamese court, written in a style reminiscent of the Melian dialogue of Thucydides and couched in terms that brooked no compromise. The emperor and his ministers were to have no opportunity to discuss the terms of the treaty or to haggle over individual clauses. They must accept the treaty in full, or the terrible vengeance of France would fall upon them:

If we wanted to, we could destroy your dynasty root and branch and seize for ourselves the entire kingdom, as we have done in Cochinchina. You know very well that this would present no difficulty to our armies. For a moment, you hoped to find help from a great empire on your borders, which has on several occasions posed as your suzerain. But even if such a suzerainty ever existed, and whatever the consequences that might once have resulted from it, it is now nothing but a historical curiosity. Now here is a fact which is quite certain. You are completely at our mercy. We have the power to seize and destroy your capital and to starve you all to death. It is up to you to choose between war and peace. We do not wish to conquer you, but you must accept our protectorate. For your people, it is a guarantee of peace and prosperity. For your government and your court, it is the only chance of survival. We give you forty-eight hours to accept or reject, in their entirety and without discussion, the terms which we are magnanimously offering you. We believe that there is nothing in them dishonourable to you, and if they are carried out with sincerity on both sides they will bring happiness to the people of Annam. But if you reject them, you can expect to suffer the most terrible of misfortunes. The worst catastrophe you are capable of imagining will fall far short of what will actually befall you. The empire of Annam, its royal dynasty and its princes and court will have voted for their own extinction. The very name of Vietnam will be erased from history.

Cowed by the French appeal to naked force, the Vietnamese court gave way immediately, and on 25 August 1883, Vietnamese plenipotentiaries signed a treaty whose terms were dictated by Harmand.

== Main features of the treaty ==
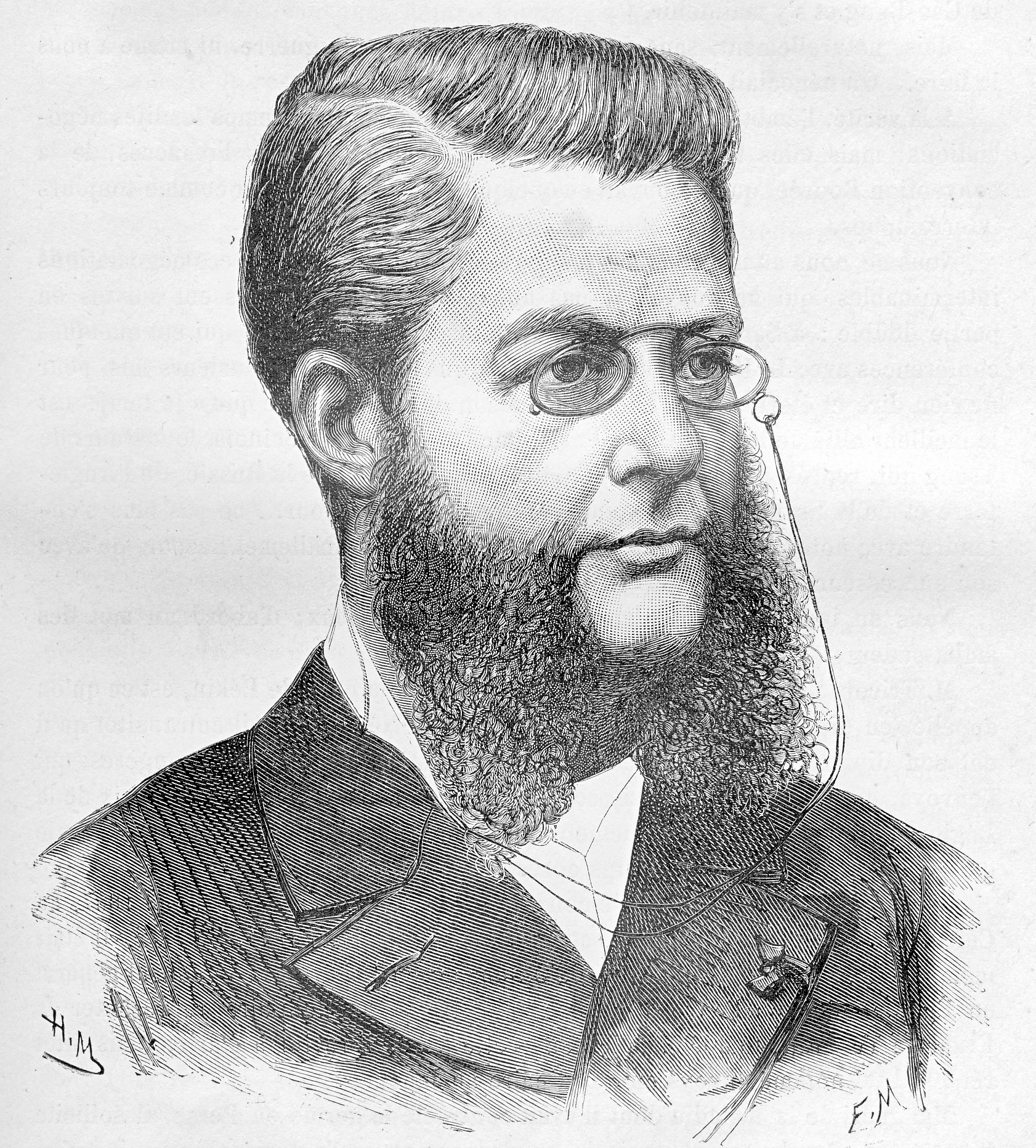
François-Jules Harmand (1845–1921), architect of the Treaty of Huế

The Treaty of Huế gave France everything it wanted from Vietnam. The Vietnamese re-recognised the legitimacy of the French colonial rule in Cochinchina, accepted a French protectorate both for Annam and Tonkin and promised to withdraw their troops from Tonkin. Vietnam, its imperial house and its court survived, but under French direction. France was granted the privilege of stationing a resident-general at Huế, who would work to the civil commissioner-general in Tonkin and could require a personal audience with the Vietnamese king, a concession that the Vietnamese had never before been prepared to make (Article 11). To ensure there were no second thoughts, a permanent French garrison would occupy the Thuận An forts and the Đèo Ngang mountain chain on the border between Annam and Tonkin (Article 3). Large swathes of territory were also transferred from Annam to Cochinchina and Tonkin. The French cancelled the country's debts (Article 26) but required in return the cession of the southern province of Bình Thuận (Note: Ninh Thuận was also a part of Bình Thuận province at that time.), which was annexed to the French colony of Cochinchina (Article 2). At the same time the northern provinces of Nghệ An, Thanh Hóa and Hà Tĩnh were transferred to Tonkin, where they would come under direct French oversight. In return, the French undertook to drive out the Black Flag Army from Tonkin and to guarantee freedom of commerce on the Red River (Article 23). These were hardly concessions since they were planning to do both anyway.

== Text of the treaty (original French) ==
The original French text of the treaty, in twenty-seven articles, is given below.

Art. 1. L’Annam reconnaît et accepte le protectorat de la France, avec les conséquences de ce mode de rapports au point de vue du droit diplomatique européen, c’est-à-dire que la France présidera aux relations de toutes les Puissances étrangères, y compris la Chine, avec le Gouvernement annamite, qui ne pourra communiquer diplomatiquement avec lesdites Puissances que par l'intermédiaire de la France seulement.

Art. 2. Le province de Binh-Thuan est annexée aux possessions françaises de la Basse-Cochinchine.

Art. 3. Une force militaire française occupera d'une façon permanente la chaîne de montagnes Deo-Ngang, qui aboutit au cap Ving-Kuia, ainsi que les forts de Thuan-An, et ceux de l'entrée de la rivière de Hué, qui seront reconstruits au gré des autorités françaises. Les forts s’appellent en langue annamite : Ha-Duon, Tran-Haï, Thay-Duong, Trang-Lang, Hap-Chau, Lo-Thau et Luy-Moï.

Art. 4. Le Gouvernement annamite rappellera immédiatement les troupes envoyées au Tonkin, dont les garnisons seront remises sur le pied de paix.

Art. 5. Le Gouvernement annamite donnera l'ordre aux mandarins du Tonkin d'aller reprendre leurs postes, nommera de nouveaux fonctionnaires aux postes vacants, et confirmera éventuellement, après entente commune, les nominations faites par les autorités françaises.

Art. 6. Les fonctionnaires provinciaux depuis la frontière nord du Binh-Thuan jusqu’à celle du Tonkin – et par cette dernière nous entendons la chaîne Deo-Ngang qui servira de limite – administreront, comme par le passé, sans aucun contrôle de la France, sauf en ce qui concerne les douanes ou bien les travaux publics, et, en général, tout ce qui exige une direction unique et la compétence de techniciens européens.

Art. 7. Dans les limites ci-dessus, le Gouvernement annamite déclarera ouverts au commerce de toutes les nations – outre le port de Quin-Nhon – ceux de Tourane et de Xuanday. On discutera ultérieurement s’il n’est pas avantageux aux deux États d'en ouvrir d'autres, et l'on fixera également les limites des concessions françaises dans les ports ouverts. La France y entretiendra des agents, sous les ordres du Résident de France à Hué.

Art. 8. La France pourra élever un phare soit au cap Varela, soit au cap Padaran ou à Poulo-Cécir de mer, suivant les conclusions d'un rapport qui sera fait par des officiers et ingénieurs français.

Art. 9. Le Gouvernement de S. M. le Roi d'Annam s’engage à réparer, à frais communs et après entente, entre les deux Hautes Parties contractantes, la grande route d'Hanoi à Saigon, et à l'entretenir en bon état, de façon à y permettre le passage des voitures. La France fournira des ingénieurs pour faire exécuter les travaux d'art, tels que ponts et tunnels.

Art. 10. Une ligne télégraphique sera établie sur ce trajet et exploitée par des employés français. Une partie des taxes sera attribuée au Gouvernement annamite, qui concédera, en outre, le terrain nécessaire aux stations.

Art. 11. Il y aura à Hué un Résident, fonctionnaire d'un rang très élevé. Il ne s'immiscera pas dans les affaires intérieures de la province de Hué, mais il sera le représentant du protectorat français, sous le contrôle du Commissaire général du Gouvernement de la République française, lequel présidera aux relations extérieures du royaume d'Annam, mais pourra déléguer son autorité et tout ou partie de ses pouvoirs au résident de Hué. Le Résident de France à Hué aura droit d'audience privée et personnelle auprès de S. M. le Roi d'Annam, qui ne pourra refuser de le recevoir, sans motif valable.

Art. 12. Au Tonkin, il y aura un Résident à Hanoï, un à Haïphong, un dans les villes maritimes qui pourraient ultérieurement se fonder, un au chef-lieu de chaque grande province. Aussitôt que le besoin s'en fera sentir, les chefs-lieux des provinces secondaires recevront aussi des fonctionnaires français qui seront placés sous l'autorité des Résidents de la grande province de laquelle ils relèvent, suivant le système des divisions administratives du pays.

Art. 13. Les Résidents et les Résidents-adjoints seront assistés des aides et collaborateurs qui leur seront nécessaires, et protégés par une garnison française ou indigène, suffisante pour assurer leur pleine sécurité.

Art. 14. Les Résidents éviteront de s'occuper des détails de l'administration intérieure des provinces. Les mandarins indigènes de toute catégorie continueront à gouverner et à administrer sous leur contrôle; mais ils pourront être changés sur la demande des autorités françaises, s'ils manifestaient de mauvaises dispositions à leur égard.

Art. 15. C'est par l'intermédiaire des Résidents seuls que les fonctionnaires et employés français de toute catégorie, appartenant aux services généraux, tels que postes et télégraphes, trésor, douanes, travaux publics, écoles françaises, etc., etc., pourront avoir des rapports officiels avec les autorités annamites.

Art. 16. Les Résidents rendront la justice dans toutes les affaires civiles, correctionnelles ou commerciales entre les Européens de toutes nationalités, et les indigènes, entre ceux-ci et ceux des Asiatiques étrangers qui voudront jouir des avantages de la protection française. Les appels des jugements des Résidents seront portés à Saïgon.

Art. 17. Les Résidents contrôleront la police dans les agglomérations urbaines, et leur droit de contrôle sur les fonctionnaires indigènes s'étendra suivant les développements desdites agglomérations.

Art. 18. Les Résidents centraliseront, avec le concours des Quan-Bo, le service des impôts, dont ils surveilleront la perception et l'emploi.

Art. 19. Les douanes, réorganisées, seront entièrement confiées à des administrateurs français. Il n'y aura que des douanes maritimes et des frontières, placées partout où le besoin s'en fera sentir. Aucune réclamation ne sera admise relativement aux douanes pour les mesures prises par les autorités militaires au Tonkin.

Art. 20. Les citoyens ou sujets français jouiront, dans toute l'étendue du Tonkin, et dans les ports ouverts de l'Annam, d'une entière liberté pour leurs personnes et leurs propriétés. Au Tonkin, et dans les limites des ports ouverts de l'Annam, ils pourront circuler, s'établir et posséder librement. Il en sera de même de tous les étrangers qui réclameront le bénéfice de la protection française d'une façon permanente ou temporaire.

Art. 21. Les personnes qui, pour des motifs d'ordre scientifique ou autres, voudront voyager dans l'intérieur de l'Annam, ne pourront en obtenir l'autorisation que par l'intermédiaire du Résident de France à Hué, du Gouverneur de la Cochinchine ou du Commissaire général de la République au Tonkin. Ces autorités leur délivreront des passeports qui seront présentés au visa du Gouvernement annamite.

Art. 22. La France entretiendra, tant que cette précaution lui paraîtra nécessaire, des postes militaires le long du Fleuve-Rouge, de façon à en garantir la libre circulation. Elle pourra également élever des fortifications permanentes où elle le jugera utile.

Art. 23. La France s'engage à garantir désormais l'intégrité complète des États de S. M. le Roi d'Annam, à défendre ce Souverain contre toutes les agressions du dehors et contre toutes les rébellions du dedans, et à soutenir ses justes revendications contre les étrangers. La France se charge à elle seule de chasser du Tonkin les bandes connues sous le nom de Pavillons-Noirs et d'assurer par ses moyens la sécurité et la liberté du commerce du Fleuve-Rouge. Sa Majesté le Roi d'Annam continue, comme par le passé, à diriger l'administration intérieure de ses États, sauf les restrictions qui résultent de la présente convention.

Art. 24. La France s'engage également à fournir à S. M. le Roi d'Annam tous les instructeurs, ingénieurs, savants, officiers, etc., dont elle aura besoin.

Art. 25. La France considérera en tous lieux, au dedans comme au dehors, tous les Annamites comme ses vrais protégés.

Art. 26. Les dettes actuelles de l'Annam vis-à-vis de la France seront considérées comme acquittées par le fait de la cession de Binh-Thuan.

Art. 27. Des conférences ultérieures fixeront la quotité à attribuer au Gouvernement annamite sur le produit des douanes, des taxes télégraphiques, etc., etc., du royaume, des impôts et douanes du Tonkin et des monopoles ou entreprises industrielles qui seront concédées au Tonkin. Les sommes prélevées sur ces recettes ne pourront pas être inférieures à 2 millions de francs. La piastre mexicaine et les monnaies d'argent de la Cochinchine française auront cours forcé dans toute l'étendue du royaume, concurremment avec les monnaies nationales annamites.

La présente Convention sera soumise à l'approbation du Président de la République française et de S. M. le Roi d'Annam, et les ratifications en seront échangées aussitôt que possible.

La France et l'Annam nommeront alors des Plénipotentiaires qui se réuniront à Hué pour examiner et régler tous les points de détails.

Les Plénipotentiaires nommés par le Président de la République française et S. M. le Roi d'Annam étudieront, dans une conférence, le régime commercial le plus avantageux aux deux États, ainsi que le règlement du système douanier sur les bases indiquées à l'article 19 ci-dessus. Ils étudieront aussi toutes les questions relatives aux monopoles du Tonkin, aux concessions de mines, de forêts, de salines et d'industries généralement quelconques.

Fait à Hué, en la légation de France, le 25e jour du mois d'août 1883 (23e jour du 7e mois annamite).

== Text of the treaty (English translation) ==
Article 1. Annam recognises and accepts the protectorate of France and the consequences that this relationship entails in European diplomatic practice, namely that France will be responsible for relations with all foreign powers, including China, with the Annamese government, and that the latter may only communicate diplomatically with these powers through the sole intermediary of France.

Article 2. The province of Bình Thuận is annexed to the French possessions in Lower Cochinchina.

Article 3. A French military force will occupy the Deo Ngang mountain chain, terminating at Cape Ving Kuia, on a permanent basis, and also the Thuan An forts and the forts at the entrance to the Huế River, which will be rebuilt at the discretion of the French authorities. These forts are called in the Annamese language Ha Duon, Tran Hai, Thay Duong, Trang Lang, Hap Chau, Lo Thau and Luy Moi.

Article 4. The Annamese government will immediately recall the troops it has sent to Tonkin, whose garrisons shall be restored to a peacetime footing.

Article 5. The Annamese government shall order the mandarins of Tonkin to return to their posts, appoint new officials to the posts presently vacant, and confirm the nominations made by the French authorities once they have been mutually agreed.

Article 6. The governors of the provinces lying between the northern frontier of Bình Thuận and the frontier of Tonkin (by which we mean the frontier defined by the Deo Ngang chain) will continue to administer their provinces as previously, free from French control except in matters concerning the customs and the public works and, in general, any aspect of administration requiring the sole direction and technical expertise of European specialists.

Article 7. Within the above limits, the Annamese government shall declare open to the commerce of all nations the ports of Tourane and Xuan Day, as well as that of Qui Nhơn. The two States shall further discuss the advantages of opening other ports, and will also settle the boundaries of the French concessions in the open ports. France will maintain agents in these ports, under the orders of the French Resident at Huế.

Article 8. France may erect a lighthouse either at Cap Varela, Cap Padaran or coastal Poulo Cecir, in accordance with the conclusions of a report to be made by French officers and engineers.

Article 9. The Government of His Majesty the King of Annam undertakes to repair, at the public expense and upon terms agreed by the two High Contracting Parties, the main road from Hanoi to Saigon, and to maintain it in good condition so that it can carry wheeled traffic. France will provide engineers to supervise the construction of technically demanding works such as bridges and tunnels.

Article 10. A telegraph line shall be built along this route and operated by French employees. Part of the tax revenue therefrom shall be remitted to the Annamese government in return for the surrender of the land necessary for the telegraph stations.

Article 11. An official of the very highest rank shall be installed at Huế as Resident. He will not interfere in the internal affairs of the province of Huế, but he will be the representative of the French protectorate and will answer to the Commissioner-General of the French Republic, who will oversee the external relations of the kingdom of Annam but may delegate his authority and his powers, either wholly or partly, to the Resident at Huế. The Resident of France at Huế will enjoy the right of a private and personal audience with His Majesty the King of Annam, who may not refuse to receive him unless he has a convincing reason.

Article 12. In Tonkin there shall be one Resident in Hanoi, one in Haiphong, one in any other coastal town that might be established in future, and one in the capital of each large province. Should the need arise, the capitals of the smaller provinces shall also receive French officials forthwith. These, in accordance with the system for the administrative divisions of the country, shall be placed under the authority of the Residents of the large province to which they pertain.

Article 13. The Residents and Deputy Residents shall be provided with as many assistants and helpers as they need, and shall be protected by a French or native garrison large enough to guarantee their safety.

Article 14. The Residents shall refrain from interfering in the details of the internal administration of the provinces. Subject to their oversight, the native mandarins at all ranks shall continue to govern and administer them, but they may be replaced at the demand of the French authorities if they display any ill will towards them.

Article 15. Official contacts between the Annamese authorities and French officials and employees of all grades working in the posts and telegraphs, the treasury, the customs, the public works, French schools and other areas of general service, must be channelled through the Residents alone.

Article 16. The Residents shall dispense justice in all civil, criminal and commercial disputes involving Europeans of any nationality and natives, and between Europeans and Asians of foreign nationality who wish to benefit from the advantages of French protection. Appeals against the decisions of the Residents must be made at Saigon.

Article 17. The Residents shall control the police in large urban areas, and their right of control over native officials shall be extended in step with the development of the said urban areas.

Article 18. The Residents shall centralise the tax system, after due consultation with the quan bo, and shall oversee the collection of the taxes and the way in which the revenue is used.

Article 19. The customs regime shall be reorganised and entrusted entirely to French administrators. Customs posts shall only be established along the coast and on the frontiers, and shall be located wherever they are needed. No complaints will be admitted in respect of measures taken by the military authorities in Tonkin in respect of the customs.

Article 20. French citizens or subjects shall enjoy complete freedom for themselves and their households anywhere within the borders of Tonkin and in the open ports of Annam. In Tonkin and within the boundaries of the open ports of Annam they may travel freely, engage in commerce, and acquire property. Similar privileges will be enjoyed by all foreigners who claim the benefits of French protection on either a permanent or temporary basis.

Article 21. Persons who wish to travel in the interior of Annam for scientific research or similar purposes must obtain authorisation for their journey through either the French Resident at Huế, the Governor of Cochinchina, or the French Commissioner-General in Tonkin. These authorities shall supply them with passports, which must be presented for a visa to the Annamese government.

Article 22. France shall maintain military posts along the Red River, for as long as such precautions seem required, to ensure freedom of navigation, and may also erect permanent fortifications wherever she thinks advantageous.

Article 23. France undertakes to guarantee henceforth the integrity of the realms of His Majesty the King of Annam, to defend this Sovereign against all external aggression and internal rebellion, and to uphold his just complaints against foreigners. France will also assume the sole responsibility for driving from Tonkin the bands known as the Black Flags, so that trade along the Red River can be carried out safely and freely. Subject to the restrictions arising from the present convention, His Majesty the King of Annam shall continue to direct the internal administration of his realm as in the past.

Article 24. France also engages to supply His Majesty the King of Annam with all the instructors, engineers, technical experts, officers, etc. that he might need.

Article 25. France shall consider all Annamese everywhere, whether inside or outside Annam, to have a genuine claim on her protection.

Article 26. The debts presently owed by Annam to France shall be considered as acquitted by virtue of the cession of Bình Thuận.

Article 27. Further talks will be held to determine the proportion of the revenues payable to the Annamese government from the customs duties and the taxes on telegraphy, etc, on the level of taxes and customs duties in Tonkin, and on the concessions to be granted in Tonkin to monopolies or industrial enterprises. The sums raised upon these receipts may not be less than 2 million francs. The Mexican piastre and the silver coins current in French Cochinchina shall be legal tender throughout the realm of Annam, alongside the Annamese national currency.

This Convention shall be submitted for the approval of the President of the French Republic and His Majesty the King of Annam, and its ratifications shall be exchanged as soon as possible.

France and Annam shall then appoint Plenipotentiaries who shall meet at Huế to consider and decide on all matters of detail.

The Plenipotentiaries appointed by the President of the French Republic and His Majesty the King of Annam shall meet to consider the commercial regime most advantageous to the two states and the organisation of the customs regime on the bases indicated in Article 19 above. They shall also study all the questions relative to the grant of monopolies in Tonkin and to concessions for mining, forestry, salt extraction and other similar industries.

Done at Huế, in the French Legation, on 25 August 1883 (the 23rd day of the 7th Annamese month).

== Treaty revision ==
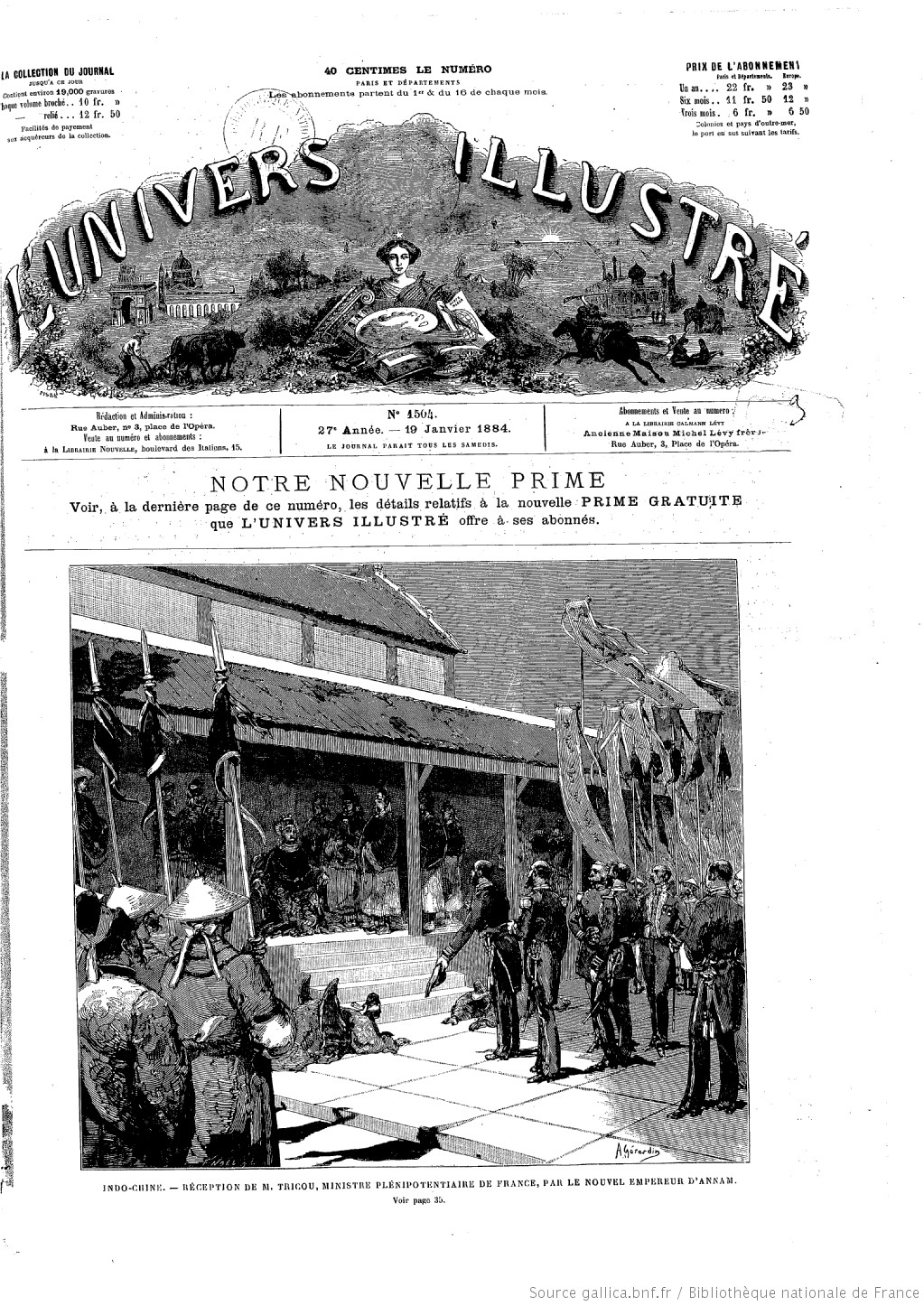
Indo-China – Reception of Mr. Arthur Tricou, Minister Plenipotentiary of France, by the new emperor of Annam.

The Harmand treaty was never ratified in France. One of its most problematic aspects, in the eyes of the Quai d'Orsay, was that it had imposed substantial territorial concessions on Vietnam. These provisions reflected Harmand's personal view that France should be aiming at the outright conquest of Vietnam. This was not the view of the French foreign ministry, which believed that it would be safer and more convenient for France to govern Vietnam indirectly, by means of a protectorate. The French foreign ministry drafted a milder version of the treaty, which revised some of the harsher clauses of the Harmand treaty.

Ignoring the reservations of the foreign ministry, the French authorities in Tonkin attempted to enforce the Harmand Treaty during the autumn of 1883, but with little success. The Vietnamese paid only lip service to the treaty's provisions. Prince Hoàng Kế Viêm continued to garrison Sơn Tây with a large Vietnamese army, in contravention of Article 4 of the treaty, and the civil authorities cooperated with the French only grudgingly. The court at Huế only modified its recalcitrant attitude after Admiral Courbet inflicted a decisive defeat on Liu Yung-fu and Hoang Ke Viem at Sơn Tây in December 1883. Believing that further resistance was useless, the court at Huế now ordered the civil authorities in Tonkin to collaborate with the French.

In January 1884, the French diplomat Arthur Tricou visited Huế to obtain the ratification of the Harmand treaty from the Vietnamese government. Aware that the victory at Sơn Tây put the French in a strong position, Tricou hinted that some of the more objectionable clauses of the Harmand treaty might be revised if the Vietnamese demonstrated their sincerity. On 1 January 1884, the Vietnamese government declared its full and complete adhesion to the Harmand treaty. Significantly, it also said that it 'trusted in the goodwill of the French Republic that some of its provisions would be softened at a later date' (s'en remettant au bon vouloir de la République quant aux adoucissements qui pourraient y être ultérieurement apportés).

The Harmand treaty was eventually replaced by a new Treaty of Huế, signed on 6 June 1884. The 1884 treaty was signed in the wake of the conclusion of the Tientsin Accord between France and China on 11 May 1884, in which China implicitly renounced her historic suzerainty over Vietnam. The treaty was negotiated for France by Jules Patenôtre, the new French minister to China.

== See also ==
- List of treaties
- Sino-French War
- Imperialism in Asia
