= History of the Loss of Vietnam =

1905 book by Phan Bội Châu

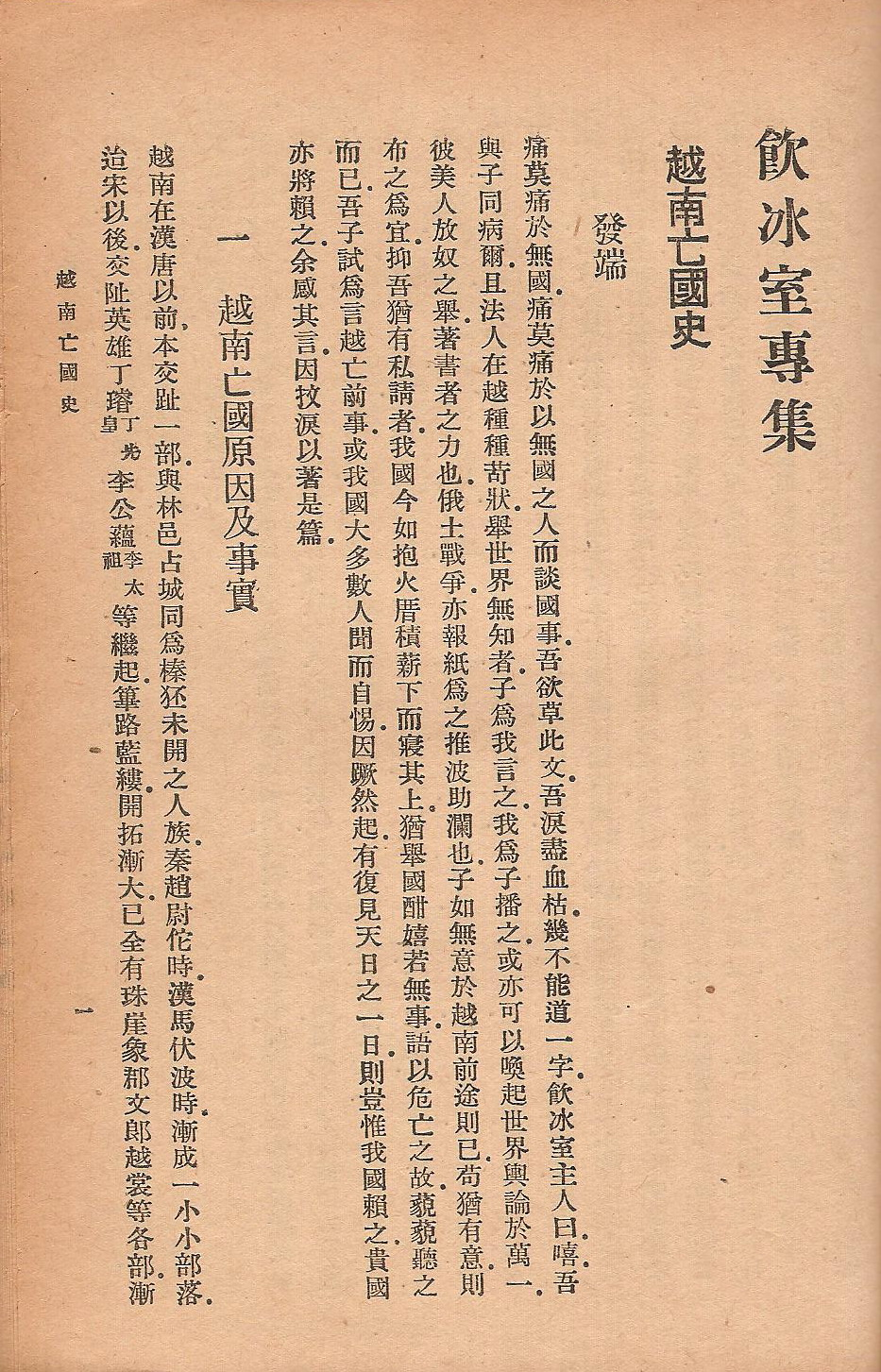
- Author: Phan Bội Châu
- Original title: 越南亡國史; Việt Nam vong quốc sử
- Language: Classical Chinese
- Publication date: 1905
- Publication place: Vietnam

History of the Loss of Vietnam (Vietnamese: Việt Nam vong quốc sử, Chinese: 越南亡國史; pinyin: Yuènán Wángguó Shǐ) is a Literary Chinese book written by Phan Bội Châu, the leading Vietnamese anti-colonial revolutionary of the early 20th century, in 1905 while he was in Japan.

It was published by Liang Qichao, a leading Chinese nationalist revolutionary scholar then in Japan, who assisted Phan during his time attempting to drum up support for Vietnamese independence in China. The book was intended for distribution mainly in China and abroad, but also for smuggling into Vietnam to rally people to the cause of Vietnamese independence. The book helped popularize the word "Vietnam." At the time, the country was generally called "Annam."

Although named under History, the book is rather a memoir than a regular history book, due to the author's working method - lack of reference documents then based mainly on his own memory.

== Content ==
The original edition of the memoir was divided to four parts: I, II, III and IV without titles, then was named by translator Nguyễn Quang Tô in the Quốc ngữ edition as 4 chapters: The reason of the loss of Vietnam, Short stories about typical patriots and mandarins right after the loss, The evil ruling of the French colonist in Vietnam, Looking forward to the future of Vietnam, respectively.

Chapter I negatively assessed the response of the Nguyễn dynasty in the 19th century to the colonial challenges facing Vietnam and the failure to modernise, with the Nguyễn instead turning to ultra-orthodox conservative Confucianism. Phan also accused emperor Tự Đức and top mandarins - who were responsible for the country's destiny - of underestimating the people and ignoring the public opinion.

Chapter II presents strident and emotive memorials to the key figures of the Cần Vương (Protect the King) movement of the late 1880s and early 1890s, led by mandarins such as Nguyễn Quang Bích, Tống Duy Tân - Nguyễn Đôn Tiết, Nguyễn Duy Hiệu - Phan Bá Phiến, and Phan Đình Phùng, who led guerrillas against the French. The Cần Vương attempted to overthrow the French rule and establish the boy emperor Hàm Nghi as ruler of an independent Vietnam.

History analyzed French social and economic policies in Vietnam, which it regards as oppression. In the book, Phan argues for the establishment of a nationwide pro-independence front with seven factions or interested groups with a specific motivation to fight the French colonial authorities.

The book was written in a style that differed from the prevailing writing technique and structure of the scholar gentry of the time. Phan eschewed this traditional style to write in a direct, ordinary prose style, especially in his analytical and argumentative sections.

== Influence ==
The book was distributed in China at least five times, and the first two printings were incorporated into Liang's periodical magazine Hsin-min ts'ung-pao. The book was accompanied by a foreword by Liang, which was used to draw similarities between the situation facing Vietnam and China with respect to foreign domination. The book created a reaction in China, sparking follow-up essays by Chinese writers who were taken aback by the Phan's description of the life that faced Vietnamese people under French rule. It generated gloomy pieces by Chinese writers who predicted that their nation would suffer a similar fate if they failed to modernise. One such Chinese response later became a teaching text at the Tonkin Free School in Hanoi, a school run by Phan's contemporaries to promote the independence movement. However, Phan did not receive much of a reaction in terms of aid towards his independence efforts, since the book mainly had the effect of worrying Chinese about their own future. History had a much better reception among readers in Vietnam. Phan left Japan for the first time in August 1905, carrying fifty copies of the book that were distributed throughout Vietnam, of which further copies were made inside the country.
