= Phạm Bành =

Vietnamese revolutionary

Phạm Bành (chữ Hán: 范澎; 1827–1887) was a Vietnamese anti-French nationalist revolutionary, who led the Can Vuong's military operations in Thanh Hóa Province in north central Vietnam. He surrendered after his mother and children were captured to gain their release and then committed suicide.
