= Algeria–Vietnam relations =

Algerian–Vietnamese relations
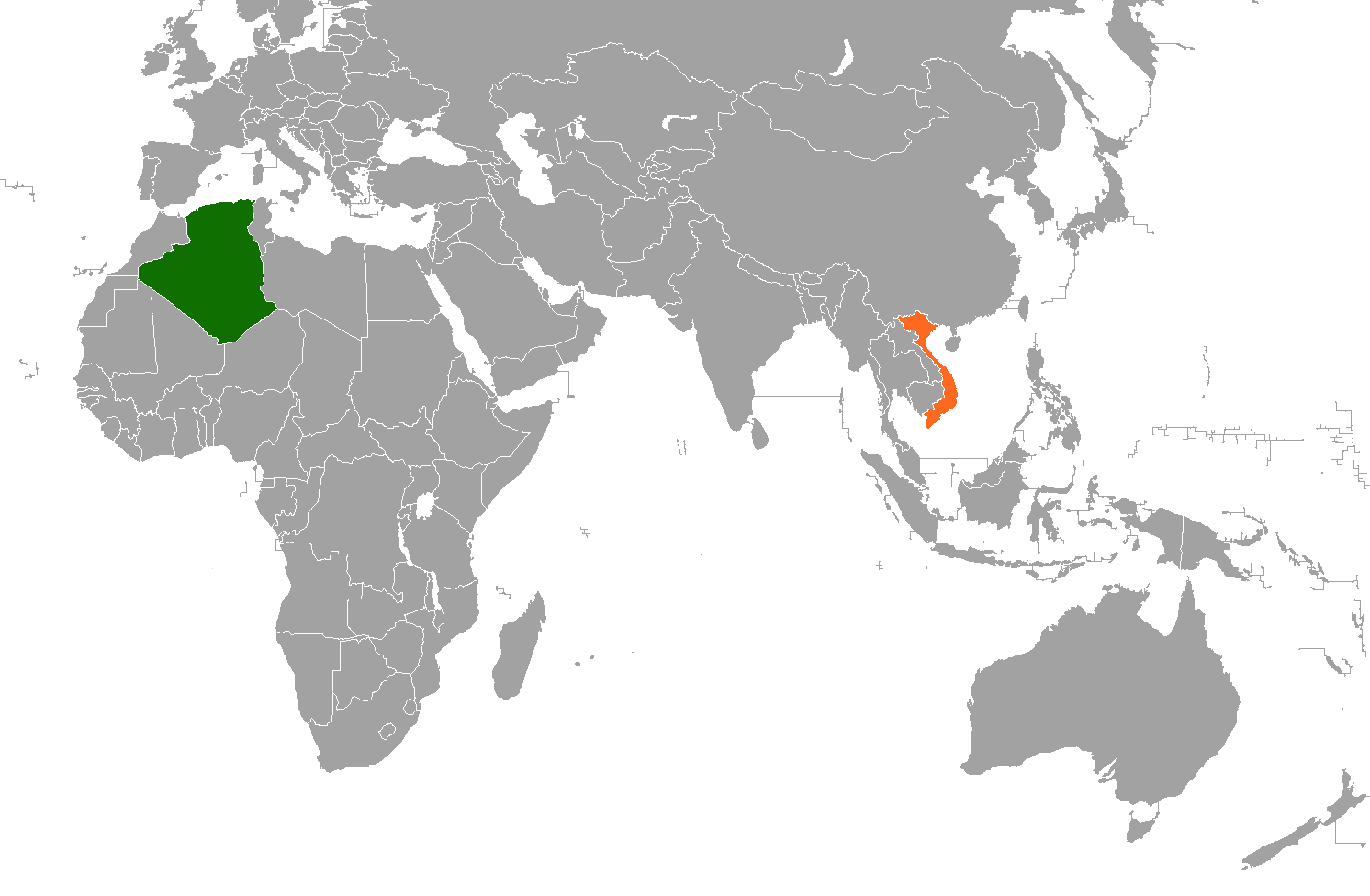
- Algeria: Vietnam

Algeria and Vietnam established formal diplomatic relations in 1962, although the link between Algeria and Vietnam has been recorded much longer than modern history. Algeria has an embassy in Hanoi while Vietnam has an embassy in Algiers.

Both countries are members of the Group of 77.

== History ==
The relationship started when France ruled over both countries from the 19th century through the mid-20th century.

When France conquered Vietnam in the 19th century, Emperor Hàm Nghi of Vietnam was forced to abdicate the throne after French suppression of the Cần Vương movement. The Vietnamese monarch was exiled to French Algeria and later lived the rest of his life in Algeria and married a Pied-Noir woman. It was the first ever contact between Algeria and Vietnam, and later, they were together linked by French colonization.

== Modern relations ==
=== Cultural relations ===
In Hanoi, the Algerian-Vietnamese High School is a symbol of strong Algerian-Vietnamese relationship. In Algiers, several streets are named for Hồ Chí Minh due to his influence on the Algerian independence movement. The Vietnam's National Day was celebrated in Algeria first in 2007.

=== Diplomatic relations ===
Algeria and Vietnam share common political similarities and interests. Both countries support the cause of Western Sahara, and have established ties with the Sahrawi Arab Democratic Republic. There is also military cooperation between them, dating back to the Algerian War.

During the Algerian War, the North Vietnamese, recently victorious during the First Indochina War provided clandestine weapon transfers to Algeria. Consequently, despite being a neutral state, Algeria’s relations were much warmer with Vietnam than others, with a draft resolution in the 1973 summit of the Non-Aligned Movement proposed by Algeria, calling on its members to support the DRV and PRG.

== See also ==
- Foreign relations of Algeria
- Foreign relations of Vietnam
