= Marcelle Laloë =

Wife of Emperor Hàm Nghi (1884–1974)

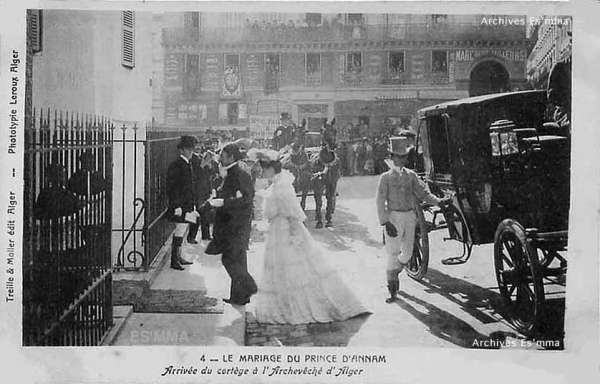
- Marcelle Laloë and Hàm Nghi at their wedding, 1904
- Born: Marcelle Aimée Léonie Laloë; July 2, 1884; Algiers, French Algeria
- Died: September 5, 1974 (aged 90); Château de Losse, Thonac, Dordogne, France
- Other name: Princesse d'Annam
- Spouse: Hàm Nghi (m. 1904; died 1944)
- Children: Như Mai; Như Lý; Minh Đức
- Parent(s): Francis Laloë; Suzanne Ving
- Relatives: Germaine Laloë (sister); Jean Laloë (brother)

Marcelle Aimée Léonie Laloë (2 July 1884 – 5 September 1974) was a French woman who was the wife of the exiled Emperor Hàm Nghi of the Nguyễn dynasty of Vietnam. After her marriage she was known as the Princesse d'Annam.

== Early life ==
Marcelle Laloë was born in Algiers on 2 July 1884, the daughter of Francis Laloë, President of the Court of Appeal of Algiers, and Suzanne Ving. She had an elder sister, Germaine Laloë (1882–1962), and a younger brother, Jean Laloë (1887–1993).

== Marriage to Hàm Nghi ==
Hàm Nghi, who had led resistance against the French, was captured in November 1888 and exiled to Algiers, where he arrived with a small retinue on 13 January 1889. On 4 November 1904 he married Marcelle Laloë at the Cathedral of St Philip in Algiers. The couple first lived in a rented villa and later bought a property in El Biar, an affluent district about 4 km from the centre of Algiers, which they named Villa Gia Long. There they hosted many society receptions that were regularly reported in the French and Algerian press.

They had three children: Princess Như Mai (born 1905), Princess Như Lý (born 1908) and Prince Minh Đức (born 1910).

Hàm Nghi was close to the Laloë family and highly regarded by them; Marcelle's parents and her sister Germaine corresponded with him and helped the household with practical matters. The Villa Gia Long had a room reserved for Marcelle's cousin Andrée Renaud, and Hàm Nghi used his nephew José Ferrer-Laloë as a model for a terracotta sculpture.

Although the press portrayed them as a happy couple, the marriage was reportedly not harmonious, and the spouses remained formal and distant with each other. According to household staff, Marcelle addressed her husband by his childhood name, Tử Xuân, only when she was in a good mood, and otherwise called him "monsieur". She has been described as rather authoritarian: she kept the children at a distance from their father, insisted on a Western upbringing and forbade them to learn Vietnamese. According to the governess Gabrielle Capek, Hàm Nghi took the children out on holidays such as All Saints' Day, Mardi Gras and Easter Monday, but never went out or stayed home with his wife. Frequent quarrels were also reported between Marcelle and her outspoken son Minh Đức, who criticised his sister Như Lý for raising her children in the strict aristocratic manner of their mother.

Marcelle did not share her husband's passion for painting; she accepted the long hours he spent in his studio but did not engage with his art. Hàm Nghi formed a close bond with Gabrielle Capek, which Marcelle knew about and tolerated until his death.

== Widowhood and death ==
Hàm Nghi died of stomach cancer in Algiers on 14 January 1944. Because of the Second World War, the children could not return from France to Algeria, and Marcelle was the only family member at his side. After his death, Marcelle and her children, especially Như Mai, carefully preserved his paintings and sculptures; the family never sold them, only occasionally giving pieces to people who truly valued them.

As a widow she moved to Thonac in the Dordogne to live with Như Mai. In 1972 she moved to the Château de la Nauche in Corrèze, home of Như Lý and her husband. She died on 5 September 1974 and is buried in the cemetery of Thonac, near her husband.
