= Thonac =

- Commune
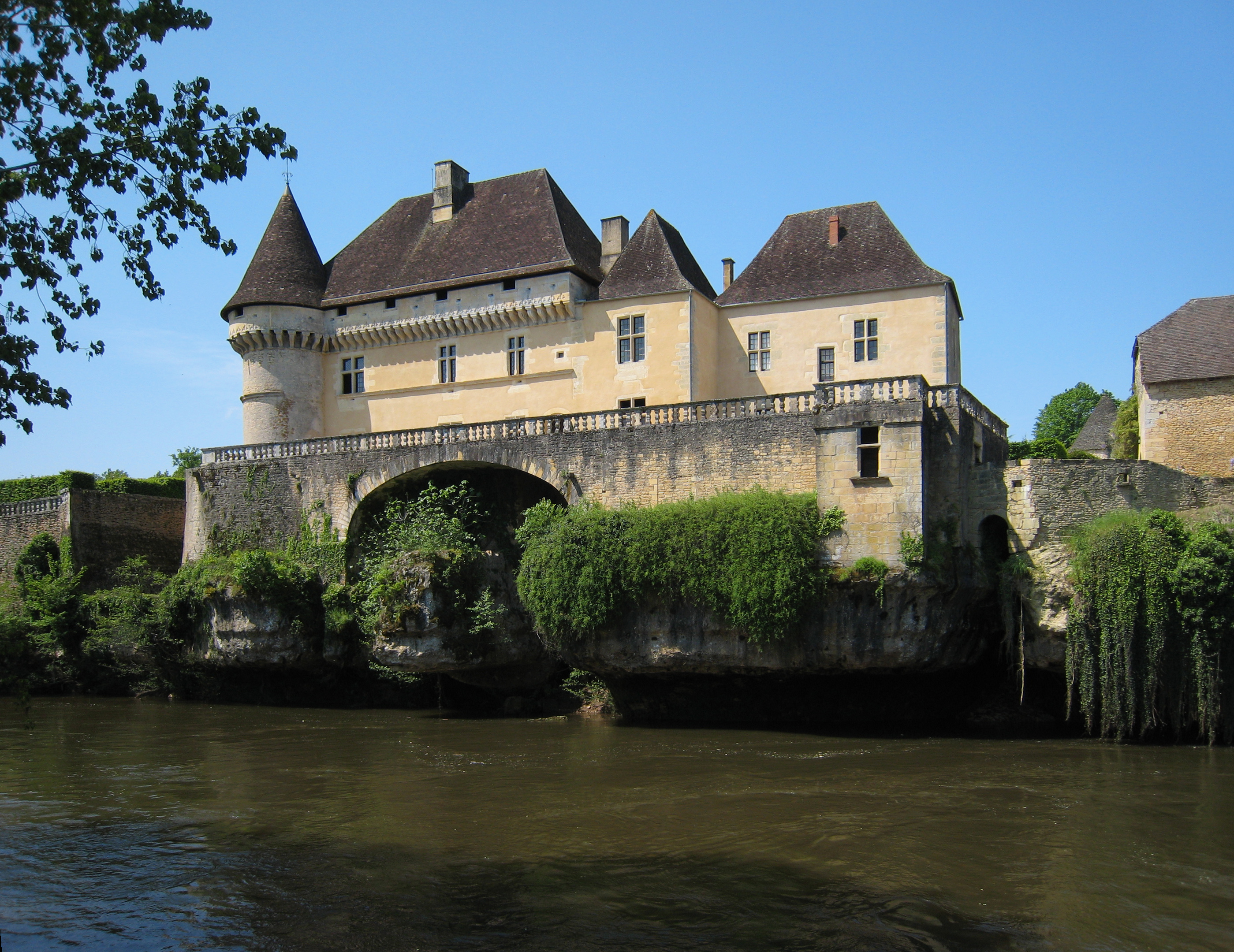
- Château de Losse

- Coat of arms
- Location of Thonac
- Location within France Location within Nouvelle-Aquitaine
- Coordinates: 45°01′23″N 1°07′05″E
- Country: France
- Region: Nouvelle-Aquitaine
- Department: Dordogne
- Arrondissement: Sarlat-la-Canéda
- Canton: Vallée de l'Homme

Government
  - Mayor (2020–2026): Christian Garrabos
- Area^{1}: 11.62 km^{2} (4.49 sq mi)
- Elevation: 72 m (236 ft)
- Highest elevation: 232 m (761 ft)
- Lowest elevation: 67 m (220 ft)
- Population (2023): 275
  - Density: 23.7/km^{2} (61.3/sq mi)
- Time zone: UTC+01:00 (CET)
  - Summer (DST): UTC+02:00 (CEST)
- INSEE/Postal code: 24552 /24290
- ^{1} French Land Register data, which excludes lakes, ponds, glaciers > 1 km^{2} (0.386 sq mi or 247 acres) and river estuaries.

Thonac (French pronunciation: [tɔnak]) is a commune in the Dordogne department in Nouvelle-Aquitaine in southwestern France. The area is notable for the Château de Losse and the cemetery contains the grave of Vietnamese Emperor Hàm Nghi.

== Population ==
Historical population
Year	Pop.	±% p.a.
1968	197	—
1975	226	+1.98%
1982	248	+1.34%
1990	257	+0.45%
1999	240	−0.76%
2007	258	+0.91%
2012	262	+0.31%
2017	252	−0.78%
2023	275	+1.47%
Source: INSEE

== See also ==
- Communes of the Dordogne department
