= Đinh Công Tráng =

Vietnamese independence activist

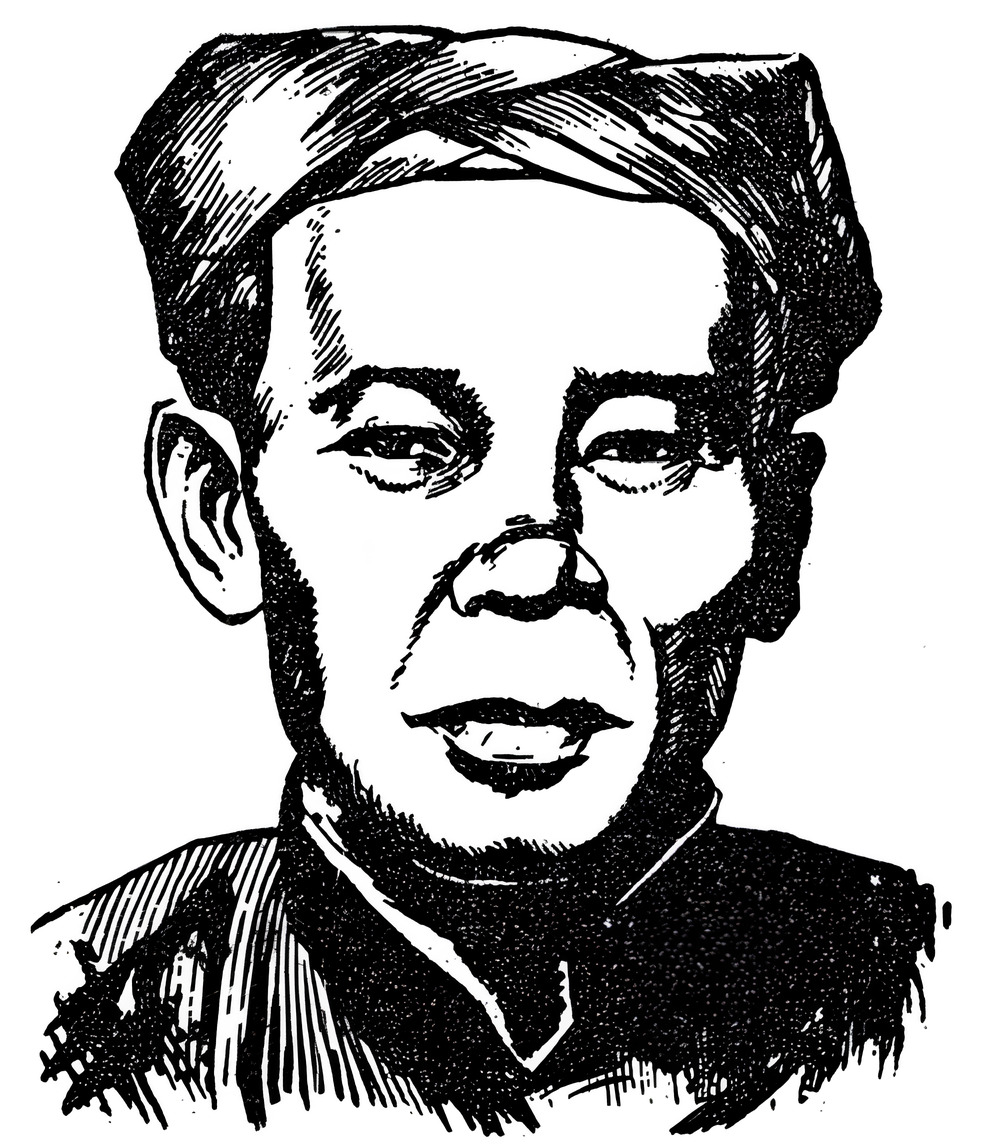
Portrait of Đinh Công Tráng

Đinh Công Tráng (chữ Hán: 丁公壯; 1842 - 1887) was a Vietnamese independence activist and leader of the Ba Đình Uprising (khởi nghĩa Ba Đình) in 1887, preceding the Cẩn Vưong (Serve the King) movement.
