= Nguyễn Quang Bích =

Vietnamese poet and independence activist

- 阮光碧
- Born: May 7, 1832; Trình Phố, Trực Định Ward, Kiến Xương district, Nam Định province
- Died: January 24, 1890 (aged 57); Tiên Động, Phú Thọ, French Indochina
- Occupations: Activist, poet

Nguyễn Quang Bích (chữ Hán: 阮光碧, 1832 – 1890) also known as Ngô Quang Bích, tự Hàm Huy, hiệu Ngư Phong; was a Vietnamese poet and independence activist. He was one of the leaders of the royalist Cẩn Vương ("Serve the King") Movement against the French in northern Vietnam.
