= Hàm Nghi =

Emperor of Đại Nam (1871–1944)

Emperor Hàm Nghi 咸宜帝
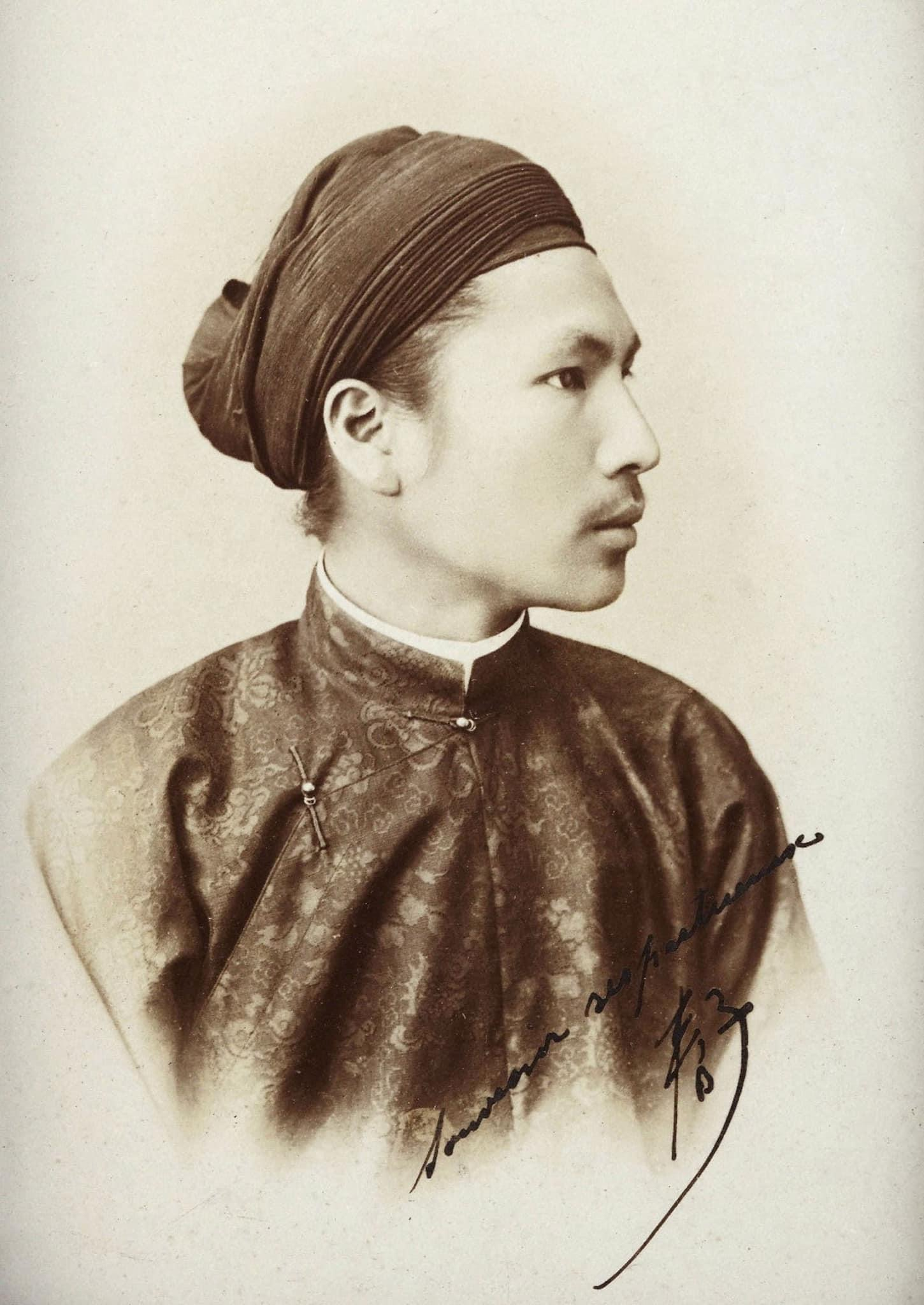
- Hàm Nghi in 1900

Emperor of Đại Nam
- Reign: 2 August 1884 – 19 September 1885
- Predecessor: Kiến Phúc
- Successor: Đồng Khánh
- Regent: Tôn Thất Thuyết & Nguyễn Văn Tường

Emperor of Nguyễn Dynasty
- Reign: 2 August 1884 – 19 September 1885
- Predecessor: Kiến Phúc
- Successor: Đồng Khánh
- Born: 3 August 1871; Imperial City, Huế, Đại Nam
- Died: 14 January 1944 (aged 72); Algiers, Algeria, France
- Burial: Thonac, Dordogne, France
- Spouses: Phan Thị Hòa; Marcelle Laloë (m. 1904)
- Partner: Gabrielle Capek
- Issue: Prince Nguyễn Phúc Bửu Trắc; Princess Nguyễn Phúc Như Mai; Princess Nguyễn Phúc Như Lý; Prince Nguyễn Phúc Minh Đức; Jean Capek
Names
- Nguyễn Phúc Ưng Lịch (阮福膺𧰡); Nguyễn Phúc Minh (阮福明)
Era name and dates
- Hàm Nghi (咸宜): 1884–1885
Posthumous name
- None
Temple name
- None
- House: Nguyễn Phúc
- Father: Nguyễn Phúc Hồng Cai (son of Thiệu Trị)
- Mother: Concubine Phan Thị Nhàn
- Religion: Ruism, Buddhism

Emperor Hàm Nghi (Vietnamese: [hâːm ŋi], chữ Hán: 咸宜 lit. "entirely right", 3 August 1871 – 14 January 1944), personal name Nguyễn Phúc Ưng Lịch ( 阮福膺簡), also Nguyễn Phúc Minh, was the eighth emperor of the Vietnamese Nguyễn dynasty. He reigned for only one year (1884–85).

He was the younger brother of Emperor Kiến Phúc. In 1884, Hàm Nghi was enthroned at the age of 12 by the regents Nguyễn Văn Tường and Tôn Thất Thuyết. After the failed counterattack at the imperial capital Huế in 1885, Tôn Thất Thuyết took him out of the capital where he issued the Cần Vương edict to resist French colonial rule.

In Hàm Nghi's name, Tôn Thất Thuyết launched the Cần Vương movement, calling upon scholars and patriots to assist the Emperor by rising up to fight and save the nation, to regain independence. This movement lasted until 1888, when Hàm Nghi was captured. Afterward, he was exiled to Algiers the capital of Algeria, where he later died in 1944 from stomach cancer. Due to pressure from the French, the Nguyễn dynasty did not confer a temple name (miếu hiệu) upon him.

Today, Vietnamese history regards him, along with Emperors Thành Thái and Duy Tân, as three patriotic monarchs during the French colonial period.

== Early life and accession to the throne ==
Hàm Nghi's personal name was Nguyễn Phúc Ưng Lịch, Upon ascending the throne, his name was changed to Nguyễn Phúc Minh. He was the fifth son of Prince Nguyễn Phúc Hồng Cai and Lady Phan Thị Nhàn, born on August 3, 1871 (though some sources state he was born on July 22, 1872) in Huế. He was the full younger brother of Emperor Kiến Phúc and his successor Emperor Đồng Khánh.

After Emperor Tự Đức’s death in July 1883, the regents Nguyễn Văn Tường and Tôn Thất Thuyết held complete power over the deposition and enthronement of emperors, but they struggled to find a suitable candidate within the royal family who shared their anti-French colonists, and pro-independence stances. Before Hàm Nghi's reign, three emperors — Dục Đức, Hiệp Hòa, and Kiến Phúc — had successively allowed themselves to be puppet's for the French or had died prematurely, becoming obstacles that needed to be removed from the increasingly unstable royal court.

Emperor Kiến Phúc suddenly died just as the independence faction was gaining ascendancy within the Huế court. After the emperor's death, it would have been appropriate for Nguyễn Phúc Ưng Kỷ (future Emperor Đồng Khánh) the second adopted son of Emperor Tự Đức, to ascend the throne. However, Nguyễn Văn Tường and Tôn Thất Thuyết feared that enthroning an older emperor would cause them to lose their grip on power. They firmly decided to select a young ruler who would fully support their anti-French stance, and thus chose Ưng Lịch.

The atmosphere of the imperial capital had clouded the spirit of national pride, and more importantly, Nguyễn Văn Tường and Tôn Thất Thuyết could easily guide the emperor regarding the grand affairs of the country. Ưng Lịch, from a young age, lived in poverty and simplicity with his biological mother, rather than being properly raised and educated in the royal palace like his two elder brothers. When the envoys came to summon him, the boy Ưng Lịch was frightened and did not dare accept the ceremonial robes and headwear they offered.

On the morning of August 2, 1884, Ưng Lịch was escorted between two rows of palace guards into the Thái Hòa Hall to perform the enthronement ceremony, taking the reign title Hàm Nghi. At that time, Ưng Lịch was only 13 years old. It was said that Hàm Nghi was enthroned according to the will left by Emperor Kiến Phúc. However, in reality, Hàm Nghi was placed on the throne by the independence faction. The leader of this faction was Tôn Thất Thuyết — a Regent and simultaneously Minister of War.

== Time at the Imperial Capital Huế ==
In July 1884, after the sudden death of Emperor Kiến Phúc, the court enthroned Hàm Nghi. Resident Superior Pierre Paul Rheinart, seeing that Nguyễn Văn Tường and Tôn Thất Thuyết had installed the new emperor without consulting France as previously agreed, sent troops into Huế to force the Nguyễn court to request permission. Rheinart sent a diplomatic note to the Huế court stating:

“If the Southern court appoints anyone as emperor, it must first seek the permission of France.”

Nguyễn Văn Tường and Tôn Thất Thuyết had to submit a request written in chữ Nôm (Vietnamese demotic script), but the Resident Superior refused it and demanded it be written in Chinese characters. The two had to rewrite it, and only then did the Resident accept it. Afterwards, he entered through the main gate to the palace to conduct the investiture ceremony for Emperor Hàm Nghi. The first task Emperor Hàm Nghi had to undertake, under Tôn Thất Thuyết's guidance, was to organize the reception of the French delegation from the Resident Superior's Office on the southern bank of the Hương River across to the Thái Hòa Hall for the enthronement ceremony.

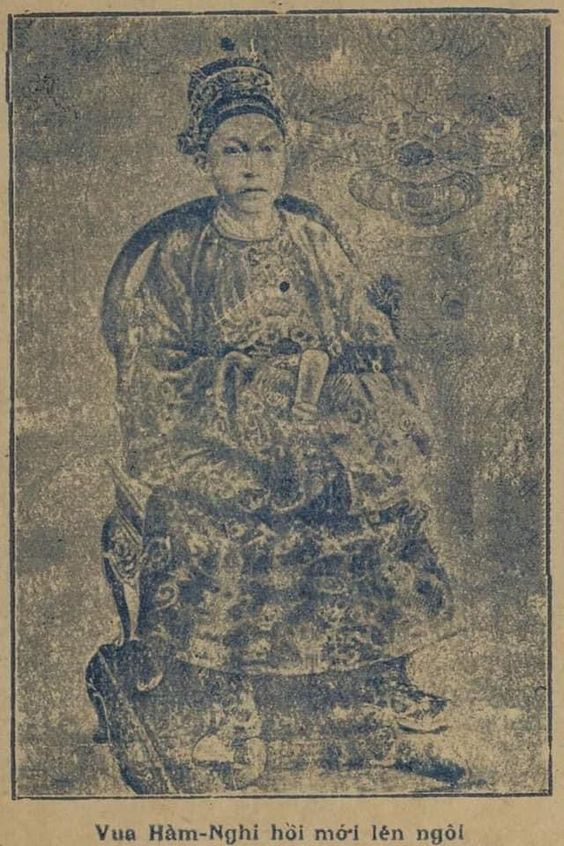
Painting of Emperor Hàm Nghi on coronation date, 1884

This was a small victory for the independence faction at the Huế court in safeguarding Hàm Nghi's throne; as for the French, after their demands and negotiations failed, they had to reluctantly accept the accomplished fact to avoid further complications. At 9 a.m. on August 17, 1884, the French delegation consisting of Colonel Guerrier, Resident Superior Rheinart, Captain Wallarrmé, and 185 officers and soldiers crossed over to the Imperial City of Huế. Guerrier demanded that the entire French force be allowed to march through the main gate of the Ngọ Môn (the Noon Gate), a path traditionally reserved for the emperor. Tôn Thất Thuyết resolutely refused. In the end, only three envoys were allowed to enter through the main gate, while the others had to use the two side gates.

Both the Huế court and the French delegation were dissatisfied, but the investiture ceremony concluded peacefully. As the French delegation prepared to leave, Tôn Thất Thuyết secretly ordered the main gate of Ngọ Môn closed, forcing the French to exit via the side gates.

Reflecting on this event, Marcel Gaultier wrote:

“Emperor Hàm Nghi preserved his sacred dignity in the eyes of his subjects. Unwittingly, the young emperor had undertaken an act with a resounding impact across the nation: with determined will for independence, and despite the French presence in Huế, the Annamese court still demonstrated a proud, unyielding attitude. This attitude was set by the Council of Regents, who rightly believed that the people would look to the king's demeanor for inspiration, interpreting it as an unspoken command to resist the French...”[4]

The following year, 1885, General de Courcy was sent by the French government to Vietnam to assist in the establishment of the protectorate. General de Courcy sought an audience with Emperor Hàm Nghi but insisted that his entire force of 500 soldiers pass through the main ceremonial gate, reserved for special guests. The Huế court requested that the soldiers enter via the side gates, permitting only the generals to use the main gate according to court protocol, but de Courcy firmly refused

== Can Vuong movement ==
On 4 July 1885, a nationwide insurrection against the French broke out under the leadership of the two regents Nguyễn Văn Tường and Tôn Thất Thuyết, acting in the name of the emperor. The French stormed the palace and Tôn Thất Thuyết took Emperor Hàm Nghi and three empresses into hiding. Hàm Nghi went to the hills and jungles around Laos along with Tôn Thất Thuyết's force. While they waged guerrilla warfare against the French occupation forces, the French replaced Hàm Nghi with his brother, Đồng Khánh, who was enthroned as the Emperor of Đại Nam.

In October 1888, after a series of setbacks, Hàm Nghi was hiding in an isolated house near the spring of the Nai river, with Tôn Thất Thiệp, the second son of Tôn Thất Thuyết, and a few attendants. There, he was betrayed by the head of his Muong guards, Trương Quang Ngọc, and captured on 1 November, while Thiệp was killed. He was turned over to French officers on 2 November.

=== Capture and exile to Algeria ===
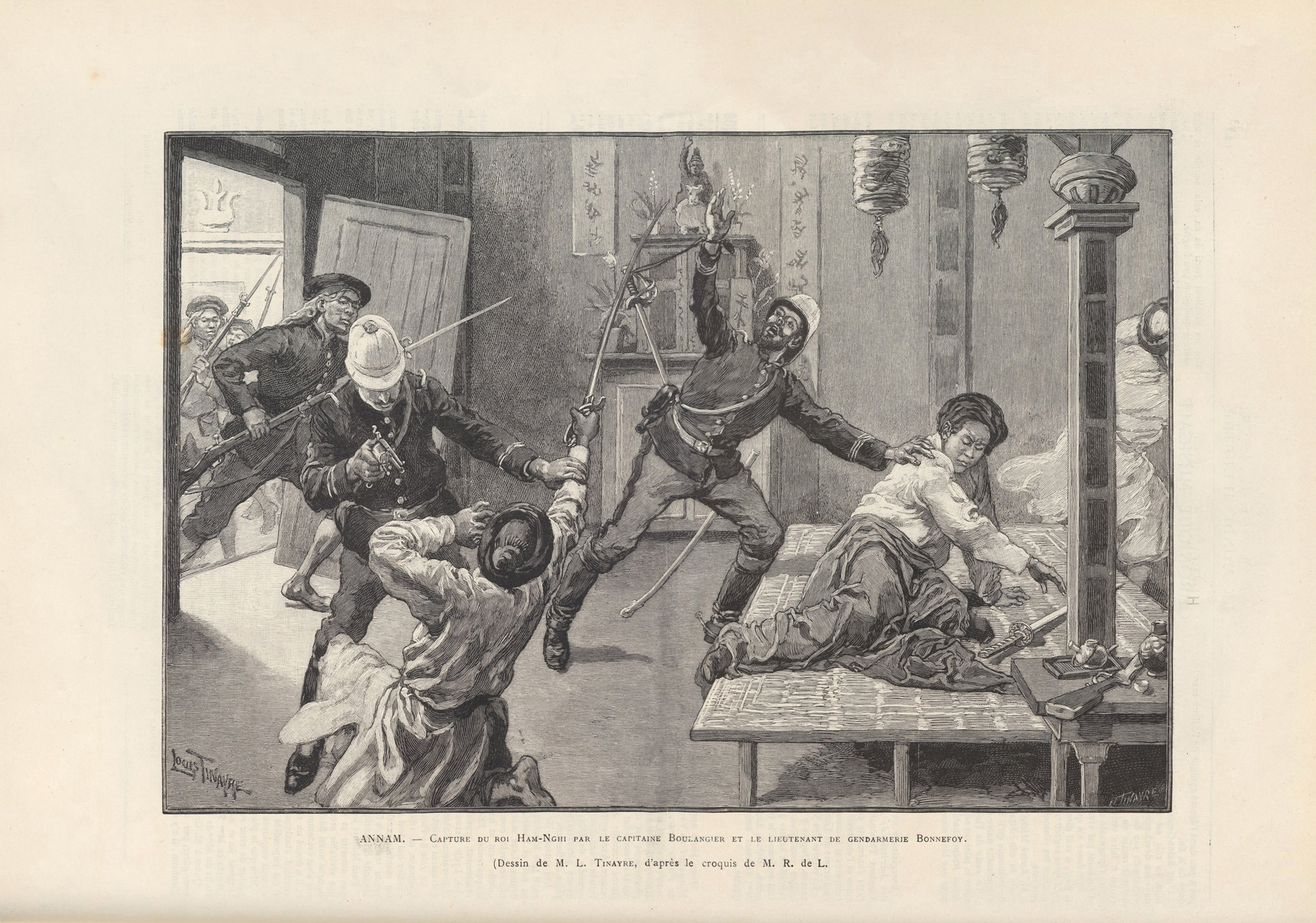
The capture of Hàm Nghi

In September 1888, at the time Hàm Nghi was staying at Tuyên Hóa district (now Minh Hóa district) in Quảng Bình, lieutenants (suất đội) Nguyễn Đình Tình and Trương Quang Ngọc voluntarily surrendered and was inquired by the French at Đồng Cá fort. They made an agreement to bring troops to capture the emperor. On the midnight of September 26, 1888, Hàm Nghi was captured while sleeping, meanwhile Tôn Thất Thiệp was being stabbed to death. He was only 17 years old. When being captured, the emperor pointed straight at Trương Quang Ngọc and said:

"Mi giết ta đi còn hơn là mi mang ta ra nộp cho Tây."
lit. 'You better kill me than hand me over to the Westerners.'

From that night onwards, Trương Quang Ngọc transferred Hàm Nghi through multiple other forts of the French army before arriving at Thuận Bài fort on the afternoon of November 14, 1888. The French organized "a very solemn welcome" for him, but he acted as if he wasn't Emperor Hàm Nghi and refused to recognize so. Then, Lieutenant Bonnefoy transferred Tôn Thất Đàm's letter to Hàm Nghi, but Hàm Nghi threw the letter under the table and acted as if it had nothing to do with him. When Nguyễn Hữu Viết, admiral of Thanh Thủy, was being brought to him to recognize the emperor, Hàm Nghi also pretended not to know him. But then, when Nguyễn Nhuận, his former teacher, went to see him, he happened to stand up and immediately bowed his teacher. Only then was the French assured that it was Hàm Nghi. From Thuận Bài, they brought Hàm Nghi through Bố Trạch and Đồng Hới before heading to the Thuận An estuary. They finally arrived at the port on November 22.

At that time, the Huế court had learned of Hàm Nghi's arrest. Emperor Đồng Khánh, installed by the French, sent officials from Thừa Thiên and the Ministry of War to welcome him back to Huế. But the French were afraid of people getting agitated seeing the emperor, so they informed the Privy Council that Hàm Nghi was now in an "unusual mood", and that it would be "inconvenient" to return to the capital, and that they needed to send him to recuperate elsewhere for a while. In spite of this, the French had drawn up a plan to exile him to Algeria. On the day before he was sent aboard a ship, Resident-Superior Pierre Paul Rheinart then informed him that the Queen Mother was seriously ill, and if the emperor wanted to visit her, he would bring her back to meet him. Hearing this, emperor Ham Nghi replied: "I am already imprisoned, my country has been lost, how can I dare to think about my parents and siblings anymore?". (Note: In Vietnamese: "Tôi thân đã tù, nước đã mất, còn dám nghĩ gì đến cha mẹ, anh em nữa.")

Hàm Nghi was exiled on 12 December 1888 to French Algeria, where he arrived on 13 January 1889. He was deposed and were officially titled Duke Ưng Lịch. The Cần Vương movement, however, would still go on for several more years back, many fighting in his name. He was placed under house arrest in El Biar, under the guard of a captain named Vialard. An annual annuity of 25,000 francs was paid to him by the budget of the Ministry of the Colonies.

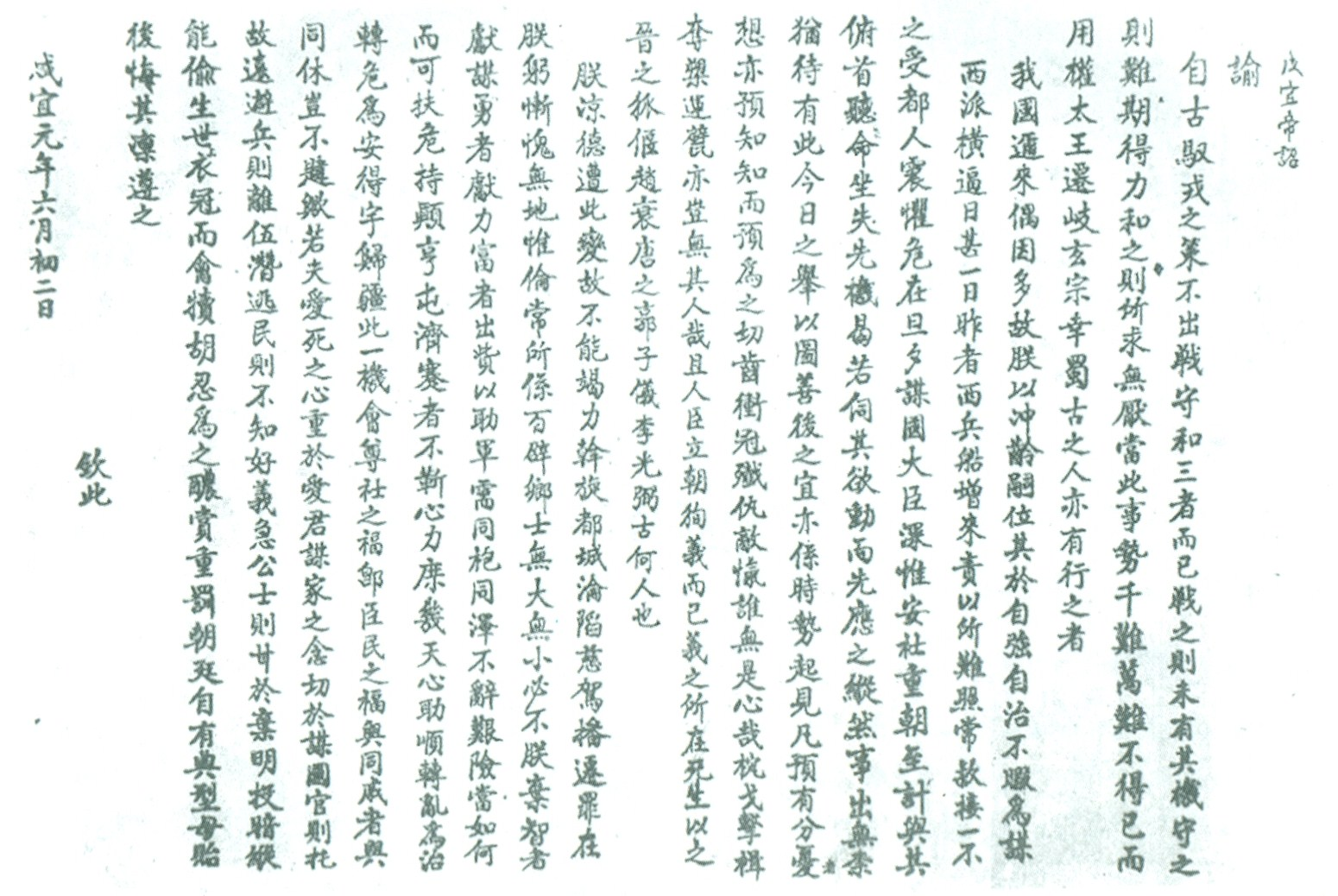
Cần Vương movement declaration

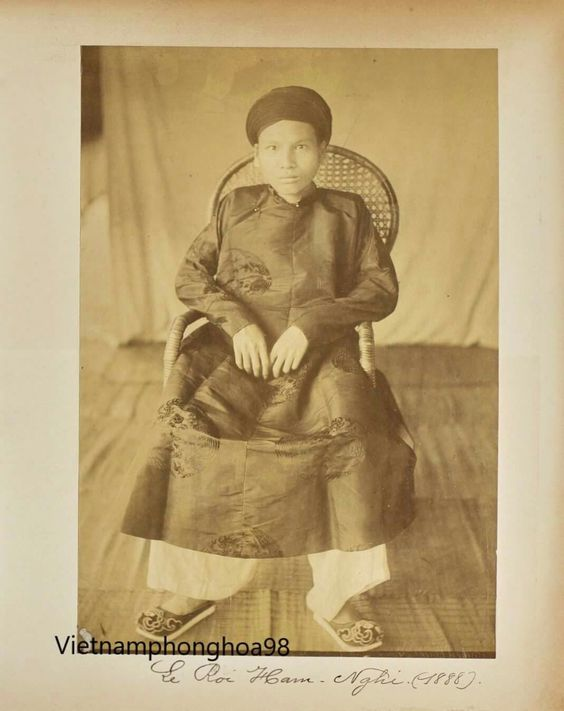
Emperor Ham Nghi after being captured by the French in 1888

== First modern Vietnamese painter ==
=== Training and artistic career ===
In exile in Algiers, Hàm Nghi began studying the fine arts as early as 1889. The Orientalist painter Marius Reynaud taught him drawing and painting, notably en plein air painting, while Auguste Rodin introduced him to the principles of sculpture. During regular stays in Paris, he mixed with many artists of his time.

Initially marked by his teacher's Orientalism, his painting evolved towards Impressionism and then Post-Impressionism; from 1904 he discovered in Paris the work of Paul Gauguin, from whom he took saturated colours and flattened planes. He signed his works with the pseudonym Tử Xuân ("Son of Spring").

Around a hundred paintings and sculptures by Hàm Nghi are known today, in private collections and museums; many of his works were lost in a fire in 1964.

=== Exhibitions ===
During his lifetime, Hàm Nghi exhibited in Paris: in June 1904, ten pastels in the rotunda of the Musée Guimet; in November 1911, at the Galerie Mantelet; and in November 1926, a retrospective at the Galerie Mantelet-Colette Weil, comprising 38 oil paintings, 12 pastels and 8 bronzes. Les Collines de Deli Ibrahim (1908), now in the Vietnam National Fine Arts Museum, was shown in this last exhibition under the signature Tu Xuan.

Several exhibitions have been devoted to him since his death:

- L'Art en exil – Hàm Nghi, prince d'Annam (1871–1944), at the Musée départemental des Arts asiatiques in Nice, from 19 March to 26 June 2022, bringing together more than 150 works, objects, letters and documents and attracting some 30,000 visitors;
- Trời, Non, Nước – Panorama allusif, at the Kiến Trung Palace in the Imperial City of Huế, from 25 March to 6 April 2025, with 21 works from ten private collections, the largest showing of his paintings in Vietnam up to that date;
- Trời, Non, Nước, at the Temple of Literature in Hanoi, from April to May 2026, with some twenty original works from ten private collections.

=== Research by Amandine Dabat ===
The recognition of Hàm Nghi as a painter owes much to the art historian Amandine Dabat, his fifth-generation descendant. Holding a doctorate in art history from Paris-Sorbonne University, she devoted thirteen years of research to him, five of them for her doctorate, drawing in particular on some 2,500 private documents kept by his eldest daughter, as well as on archives in France, Vietnam and Algeria. Her thesis was published in 2019 as Hàm Nghi. Empereur en exil, artiste à Alger.

Lê Văn Miến (1873–1943), trained in Paris, is traditionally regarded as the first Vietnamese painter. Amandine Dabat argues that Hàm Nghi began studying the fine arts in 1889, about ten years before him, and is therefore the first modern Vietnamese artist. This view is shared by the researcher Ace Lê, co-curator of the Hanoi exhibition, for whom Hàm Nghi is the first Vietnamese painter trained in Western academic methods, before the Indochina College of Fine Arts movement. Other accounts are more cautious: in 2025 the cultural attaché of the French Embassy in Vietnam described him as one of the first Vietnamese artists trained in the techniques of Western painting.

== Family ==
=== In Vietnam ===
During the Cần Vương movement, before his capture in 1888, Hàm Nghi was united with Phan Thị Hòa (1867–1936), daughter of Phan Đình Bình, whom Empress Dowager Từ Dụ had entrusted with looking after him. After the emperor's exile, she gave birth in early 1889, in Nam Định, to a son, Prince Bửu Trắc (1889–1966).

To escape the colonial authorities, Bửu Trắc lived under another identity, that of Duy Thịnh, adopted son of Nguyễn Duy Sắc, Hàm Nghi's former physician during the Cần Vương. In 1927 he settled in Cambodia, where he became financial director of the company Descours & Cabaud in Phnom Penh. He raised a family there and died in 1966. There is no direct evidence that Hàm Nghi knew of this son's existence, but he may have been informed of it through the network of Vietnamese and French friends travelling between Indochina and Algeria, the most notable of whom were Charles Gosselin, Thân Trọng Huề, Trần Văn Thông, Bùi Quang Chiêu and Bảo Đại.

Phan Thị Hòa had received from Empress Dowager Từ Dụ a pair of imperial walrus-ivory chopsticks used by Hàm Nghi during the Cần Vương. Her descendants donated them to the Huế Museum of Royal Antiquities on 5 November 2024.

=== In Algeria ===
In 1904, Hàm Nghi wished to bring to Algiers two of the children of his half-brother Ưng Quyến, who had died leaving six orphans, in order to raise them himself; the colonial authorities and the widow refused. On 4 November 1904 he married a French woman, Marcelle Laloë (1884–1974), a Catholic and the daughter of the president of the court of Algiers. The couple had three children:

- Princess Như Mai, known as Nhu-May d'Annam (1905–1999), an agricultural engineer;
- Princess Như Lý (or Như Luân) (1908–2005), who studied pharmacy at the University of Algiers and married François Barthomivat de La Besse;
- Prince Minh Đức (Jean Ung Lich Ham Nghi d'Annam, 1910–1990), an officer in the French Army and recipient of the Legion of Honour.

Although his wife opposed the children learning Vietnamese, Hàm Nghi taught them to write their names in Chinese characters and in chữ quốc ngữ, and passed on to them the history of Vietnam.

Princess Như Lý's great-granddaughter, the art historian Amandine Dabat, devoted a doctoral thesis to her ancestor, defended at Paris-Sorbonne University and published in 2019 as Hàm Nghi. Empereur en exil, artiste à Alger, in which she shows that Hàm Nghi was the first modern Vietnamese painter.

Amandine Dabat has also helped bring her ancestor's work to wider attention. She curated the exhibition L'Art en exil – Hàm Nghi, prince d'Annam (1871–1944), held from 19 March to 26 June 2022 at the Musée départemental des Arts asiatiques in Nice. On 12 November 2024, on behalf of the family, she presented the Vietnam National Fine Arts Museum in Hanoi with an oil painting by Hàm Nghi dated 1908, Les Collines de Deli Ibrahim (Alger). In 2026 she co-curated the exhibition Trời, Non, Nước, the first major showing of Hàm Nghi's works in Hanoi, at the Temple of Literature, bringing together some twenty original works from private collections.

=== Gabrielle Capek ===
From 1918, Hàm Nghi had a relationship with Gabrielle Capek (1888–1980), an orphan of Czech origin who had been his children's governess since 1912 and had lived since 1913 in an outbuilding of the Villa Gia Long. He wrote her at least thirty-seven letters, which the family has kept, and she was the muse for several of his works. A son, Jean Capek (1922–1982), was born of this relationship on 29 October 1922; he became a pilot in the French Army and was the father of Isabelle Capek, who has kept part of Hàm Nghi's works and correspondence. Gabrielle Capek remained close to the family and, from November 1943, nursed the emperor until his death.

Hàm Nghi thus had three sons, Bửu Trắc, Minh Đức and Jean Capek, and two daughters, Như Mai and Như Lý.

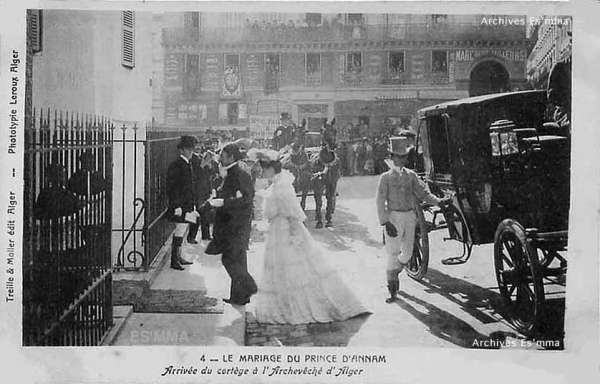
Wedding of Emperor Hàm Nghi in French Algeria

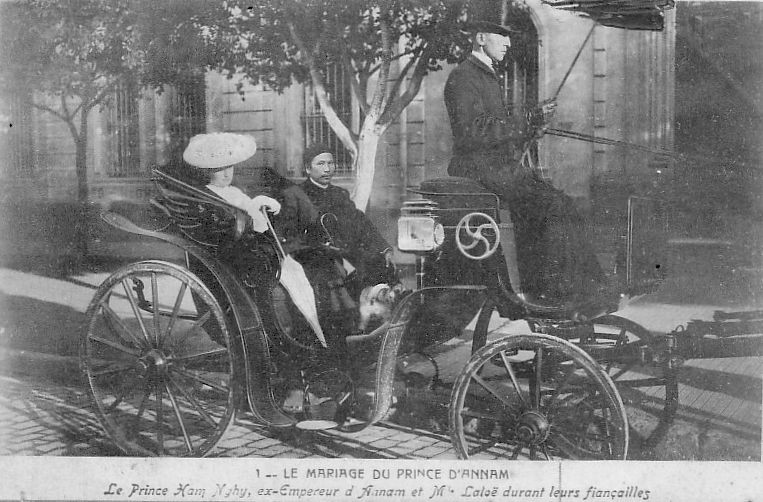
Wedding of Emperor Hàm Nghi in French Algeria

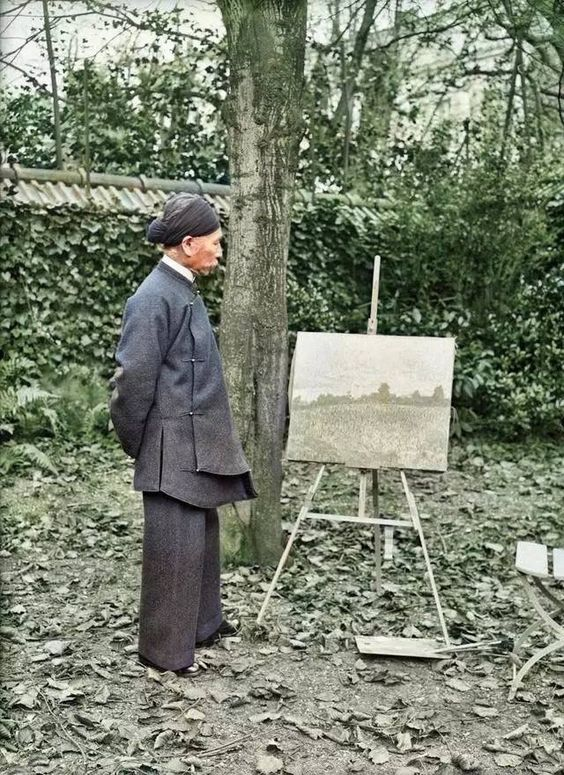
Former emperor and his painting

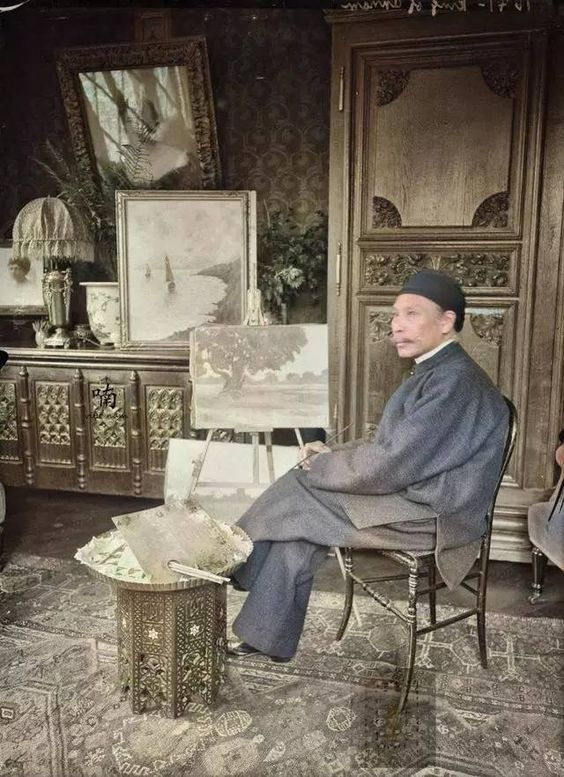
Former Emperor enjoyed painting during exile

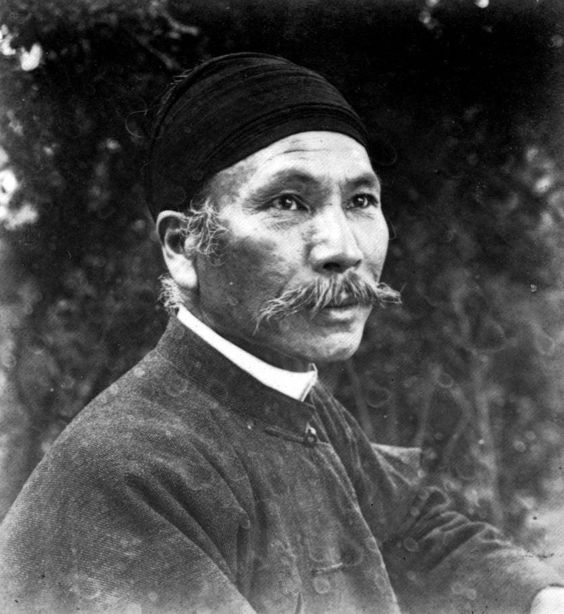
Former emperor in his old age in French Algeria

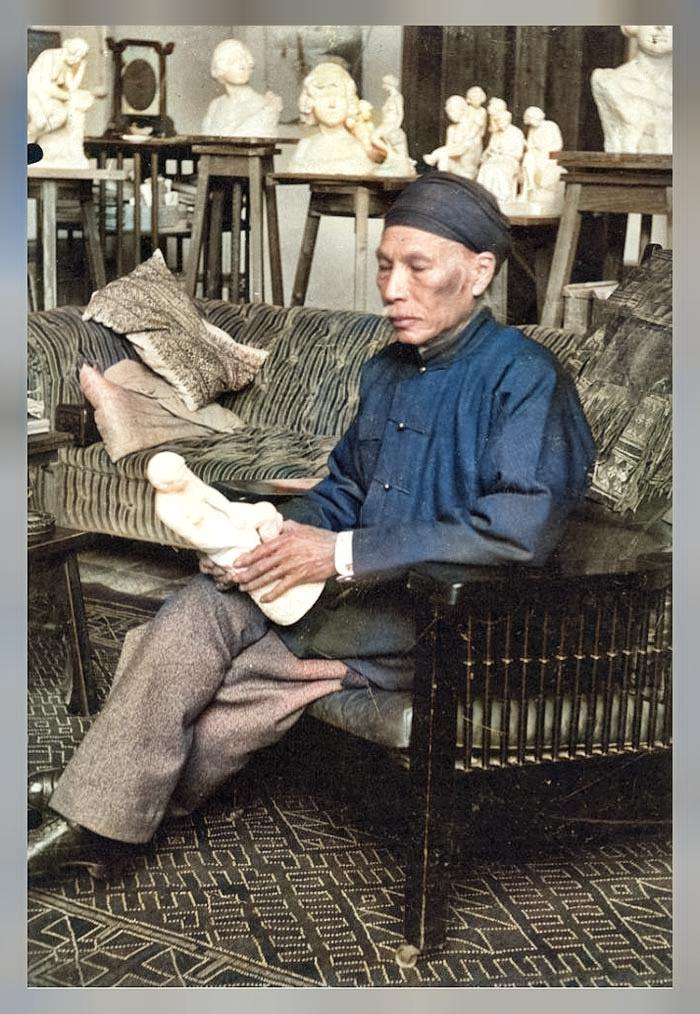
Former Emperor at his private house in Algeria

== Death ==
Hàm Nghi died on 14 January 1944 at the age of 72, and was buried in Algiers. During his exile, he had bought the Château de Losse in Thonac, Dordogne, in southwest France. In 1965, Charles de Gaulle proposed to his daughter, Countess de la Besse, to transfer his body to Thonac, where he still lies in a simple grave. In 2002, Vietnam sent a delegation to France to seek permission from Princess Nhu Lý (De la Besse died in 2005, in her 97th year) to move her father's remains to the former Imperial capital of Huế. Her family has so far refused.

== Honors ==
Some cities in Vietnam have streets named after him.

In Algiers, the street in El Biar on which his residence, the Villa Gia Long, stands is named Chemin du Prince d'Annam ("Prince of Annam Road") after him; the villa now houses the Embassy of Russia in Algeria.

== See also ==
- Algeria–Vietnam relations
- Tống Duy Tân, who attempted to install Hàm Nghi as the leader of an independent Vietnam.

== Notes ==
Preceded by Emperor Kiến Phúc	Nguyễn dynasty	Succeeded by Emperor Đồng Khánh
