= Tống Duy Tân =

Vietnamese revolutionary

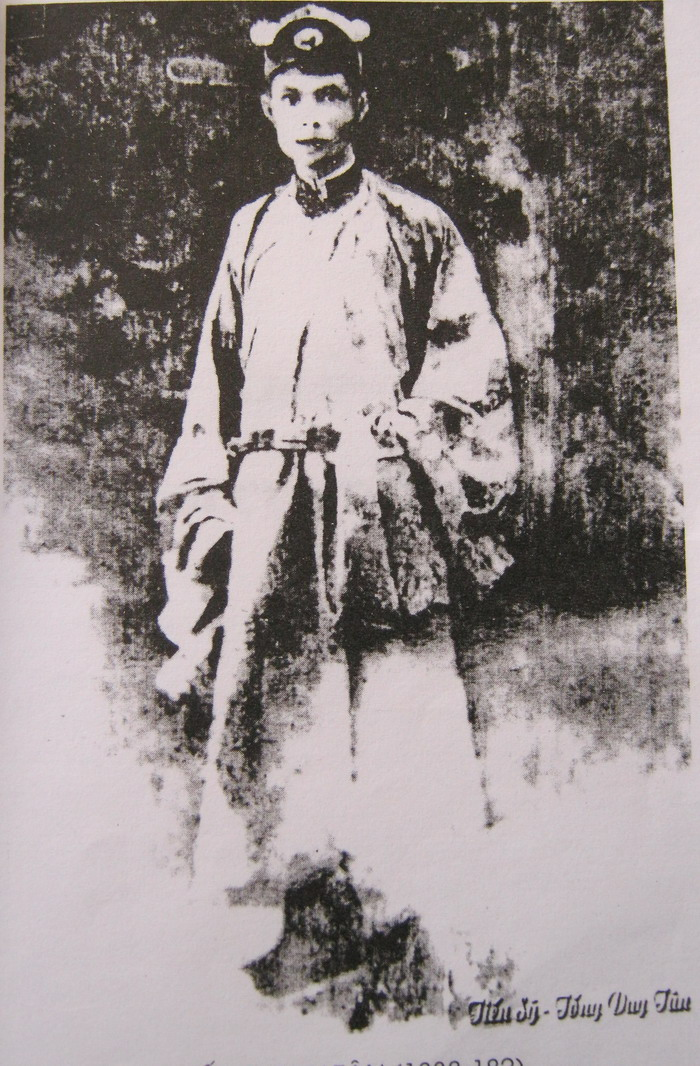
- Born: 1838; Vĩnh Lộc district, Thanh Hóa
- Died: 1892 (aged 53–54); Thanh Hóa town, Thanh Hóa
- Other name: Báo Tiền
- Occupations: Official, revolutionist
- Movement: Cần Vương
- Children: Tống Nhữ Mai

Tống Duy Tân (宋維新, 1838 - 1892), courtesy name Cơ Mệnh, was a Vietnamese revolutionary who led insurgent armies in Thanh Hóa Province of northern Vietnam as part of the Cần Vương movement that sought to install the boy Emperor Hàm Nghi as the leader of an independent Vietnam. He was captured in 1892 by the French colonial forces and executed.

== Early years ==
Tống Duy Tân was born in 1838, under the reign of King Minh Mạng, in Đông Biện village, Bồng Thượng canton (now is Bồng Trung village, Vĩnh Tân commune) of Vĩnh Lộc district, Thanh Hóa province. He graduated with a bachelor's degree in Thi Hương exam 1870, and gained a doctorate title in Thi Hội exam 1875, then became an official in Ministry of Justice under the reign of King Tự Đức.

In 1876, he was assigned as reviewer of Thi Hương exam school in Nam Định, then promoted to Tri phủ (Prefect) of Vĩnh Tường fu, Sơn Tây province (now are Vĩnh Tường and 4 other districts of Vĩnh Phúc province, and 2 districts of Phú Thọ province).

After two years served as a prefect, the Sơn Tây mandarins proposed to the court to promote him to the position of Án sát (Surveillance Commissioner), but the situation was troubled at that time, after the 2nd French invasion, Huế court was divided into war faction and peace faction ... Tống refused to work as a mandarin, asked to go back to his hometown to open a school. Later, Regent Tôn Thất Thuyết - the top leader of the war faction knew that Tống was a patriot who had a good reputation, so he appointed Tống to Đốc học (Education Commissioner), then Chánh sứ Sơn phòng (Chief of Mountain warfare force) of Thanh Hóa province, to prepare the French resistance.

== Legacy and memory ==
A high school in Vĩnh Lộc district has been named after Tống Duy Tân since 1978.

Temples and tomb of Tống Duy Tân in his hometown of Vĩnh Lộc and Thanh Hóa city have both been ranked as a national historical and cultural relic.
