= French conquest of Vietnam =

1858–1885 French conquest of Vietnam, Laos and Cambodia

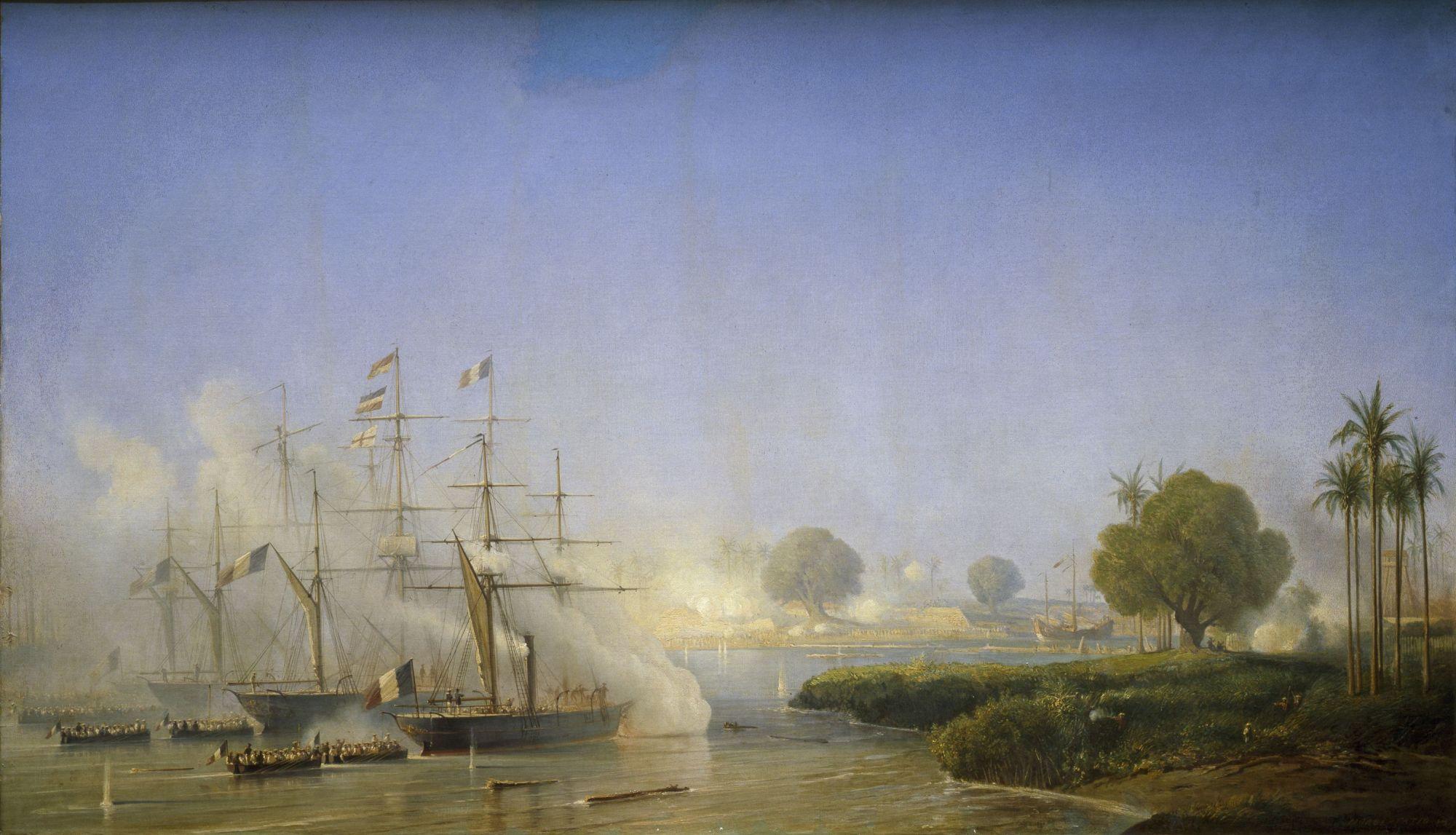
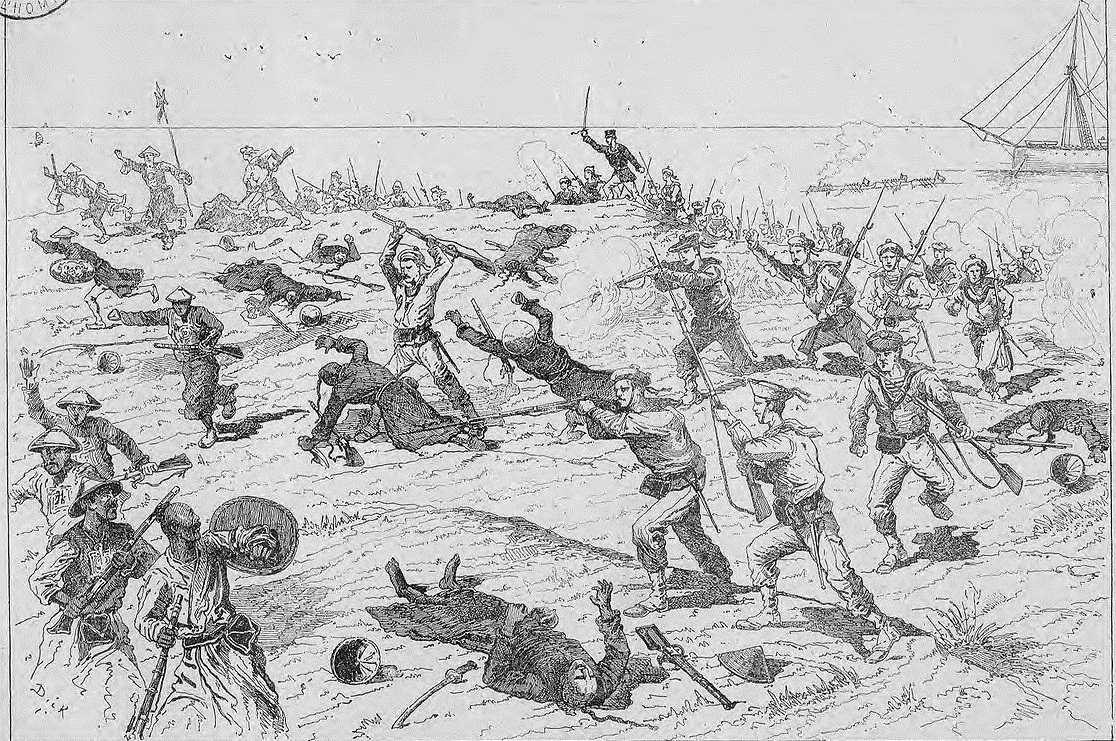
- Top: French and Spaniard armadas attacking Saigon, 18 February 1859. Bottom: French marines storm Vietnamese defenders on the shore of Thuận An (Huế) on 20 August 1883.
Date	1 September 1858 – 9 June 1885 (26 years, 9 months, 1 week and 1 day)
Location	Vietnam, Cambodia, Laos, Southern China, Fujian, Taiwan
Result	French victory; Treaty of Huế; Patenôtre Accords; Treaty of Tientsin; Vietnamese monarchy became a French vassal state; Beginning of French Indochina

Belligerents
Second French Empire (1858–71); French Third Republic (1871–85); Kingdom of Spain (1858–62)	Đại Nam (1858–83); Qing Empire (1883–85); Black Flag Army (1873–85)

Commanders and leaders
(Second French Empire) Napoleon III (Second French Empire) Charles Rigault de Genouilly (Second French Empire) François Page (Second French Empire) Léonard Charner (Second French Empire) Louis Adolphe Bonard; Francis Garnier †; Jules Ferry; Henri Rivière †; Amédée Courbet; Sébastien Lespès; Louis Brière de l'Isle; Jacques Duchesne (Restoration (Spain)) Isabella II of Spain (Restoration (Spain)) Carlos Palanca Gutiérrez	(Nguyễn dynasty) Tự Đức # (Nguyễn dynasty) Dục Đức (executed) (Nguyễn dynasty) Hiệp Hòa (surrendered) (Nguyễn dynasty) Kiến Phúc # (Nguyễn dynasty) Hàm Nghi (Nguyễn dynasty) Nguyễn Tri Phương (DOW) (Nguyễn dynasty) Hoàng Diệu † (Nguyễn dynasty) Hoàng Kế Viêm (Nguyễn dynasty) Tôn Thất Thuyết (exiled) (Nguyễn dynasty) Phan Thanh Giản †; Empress Dowager Cixi; Guangxu Emperor; Prince Gong; Zuo Zongtang; Zhang Peilun; Feng Zicai; Su Yuanchun; Liu Yongfu

The French conquest of Vietnam^{1} (1858–1885) was a series of military expeditions that pitted the Second French Empire, later the French Third Republic, against the Vietnamese empire of Đại Nam in the mid-late 19th century. Its end results were victories for France as they defeated the Vietnamese and their Chinese allies in 1885, incorporated modern-day Vietnam, Laos, and Cambodia into the French colonial empire, and established the territory of French Indochina over Mainland Southeast Asia in 1887.

A joint Franco-Spanish expedition was initiated in 1858 by invading Tourane (modern day Da Nang) in September 1858 and Saigon five months later. This four-year campaign resulted in Emperor Tự Đức signing a treaty in June 1862, granting the French sovereignty over three provinces in the South. The French annexed the three southwestern provinces in 1867 to form Cochinchina. Having consolidated their power in Cochinchina, they conquered the rest of Vietnam through a series of campaigns in Tonkin between 1873 and 1886. French ambitions to subjugate Tonkin were opposed by the Qing dynasty, the region being part of the Chinese sphere of influence.

The French eventually drove most of the Chinese troops out of Vietnam, but remaining groups in some Vietnamese provinces continued to resist France's control over Tonkin. The French government sent Fournier to Tianjin to negotiate the Tianjin Accord, according to which China recognized the French authority over Annam and Tonkin, abandoning its claims to suzerainty over Vietnam. On June 6, 1884, the Treaty of Huế was signed, dividing Vietnam into three regions: Tonkin, Annam, and Cochinchina, each under three separate regimes. Cochinchina was a French colony, while Tonkin and Annam were protectorates, and the Nguyễn court was put under French supervision.

== Background ==
France had already installed religious and trading footholds around the flourishing southeastern coast (often known as Cochinchina) of Indochina during the 17th and 18th century, which at the time those coastal port cities were under the control of the Nguyen dynasty, a Vietnamese dynasty whom power originated from the Huế City. Notable visitors include Pierre Poivre (1741). France had invested in Dai Viet by supporting Nguyen Anh's faction against the Tayson rebellion during the Vietnamese Civil War (1789–1802). French king Louis XVI signed with Nguyen Anh the Treaty of Versailles in 1787 agreed to confer the Nguyen loyalists an alliance with France. Although the treaty was never ratified, thousands of French mercenaries and officers rallied to the side of Nguyen Anh and campaigned against the Tay Son. When Anh defeated the Tay Son and was crowned as Emperor Gia Long (r. 1802–1819) of the unified Kingdom of Vietnam in 1802, roughly 400 Frenchmen served the new monarchy as court officials and advisers of Gia Long, who relatively tolerated all religions including Catholicism. Gia Long's successor–Minh Mạng (r. 1820–1841) was a conservative, Confucian-minded, and isolationist ruler. He abolished diplomatic relations with France in 1826. Beginning in 1833, after the Lê Văn Khôi revolt, the Vietnamese ruler chiefly targeted Catholic Christians for religious persecution by labeling them as tà đạo (heretics), issuing several dụ cấm đạo Gia tô (edicts of restriction of the Catholic religion), and forbidding missionary activities. This persecution of Catholics and the executions of French bishops created an excuse for intervention by France, but the new French monarchy under the reign of Louis Philippe I (r. 1830–1848) did not focus on the protection of their missionaries in the Far East.

In late 1840, French captain Favin Lévêque arrived in Da Nang and requested the release of five imprisoned priests. The new emperor Thiệu Trị (r. 1841–1847) released the missionaries to show his friendly approach toward France. But situations got worse four years later when French bishop Dominique Lefèbvre was arrested and condemned to death by Vietnamese authority in 1845, prompting François Guizot to send Jean-Baptiste Cécille and obtain the release of Lefèbvre. In 1847, Lefèbvre was once again arrested, so Cécille sent Captain Lapierre and two warships to Danang. Although Lefèbvre was freed before the situation escalated, Lapierre, unaware of the news, opened fire and destroyed five Vietnamese ships in Da Nang Bay. Outraged by the French attack, Thiệu Trị ordered all European documents to be smashed, terminating all trade and terms with France, and put all foreign missionaries to be jailed and executed. He died in August 1847 and was succeeded by his son, emperor Tự Đức (r. 1848–1883). Aware of the rise of Western influences in Asia, Tự Đức reannounced the isolationist closed country policy, welcoming neither French, British, American, nor Spanish embassies, increasing the prohibition of trade, and renewed Tự Đức's Catholic persecution of Catholics.

In France, the new revolution overthrew Louis Philippe in 1848. Louis Napoleon became the President, then the Emperor of France. To intervene in Vietnam and also expand the French Empire, on 22 April 1857, Napoleon III created the Committee de la Cochinchine with Anatole, baron Brénier de Renaudière as its chairman, with the purpose of conquering Vietnam and capturing the Vietnamese monarch, using Tự Đức's persecution of Catholics and the undone treaty of 1787 as pretexts for the conquest. This action was also part of the French plan undertaken in competing with Britain's growing influence in Southeast Asia. In the same year, Tự Đức executed two Spanish Dominican priests; France and Spain declared war and launched the invasion of Vietnam.

== Historical overviews ==
=== Da Nang (1858) ===
On 1 September 1858, a Franco-Spanish fleet of fourteen warships and 3,000 expeditionary troops, led by General Charles Rigault de Genouilly, launched attacks on Vietnamese positions in Danang. He believed that they would overcome Danang and then Hue, force the Vietnamese to surrender in a quick and decisive war. However, Franco-Spanish advances were stopped by the defensive tactics of Vietnamese commander Nguyen Tri Phuong. After five months of intense combat, Franco-Spanish forces were still stuck on the uninhabited beaches of Da Nang, unable to achieve a breakthrough.

=== Southern Vietnam (1859–1862) ===
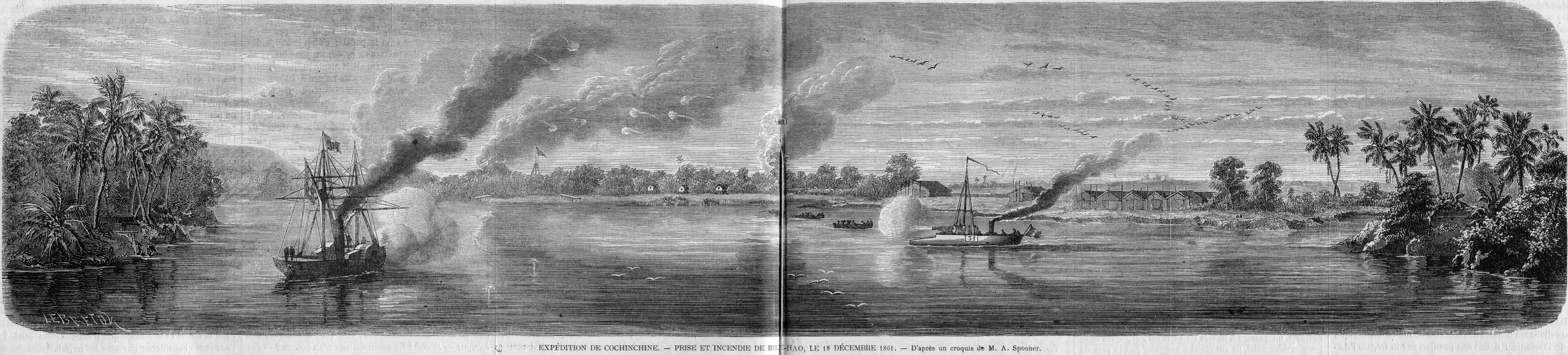
Bombardment of Bien Hoa (16 December 1861)

De Genouilly decided to abandon Danang to sail south for Saigon and the prosperous lower Mekong provinces-–the rice basket of Vietnam. He assembled 2,000 troops and 14 warships and embarked for Saigon, destroyed several Vietnamese forts and coastal guns in Vung Tau, reaching the city on 17 February 1859. French troops took the citadel of Saigon and its war booty of grain, supplies, and ammunition with ease after two days of fighting. Siam decided not to help Vietnam. Meanwhile, in the north, a Catholic bishop named Tạ Văn Phụng proclaimed himself to be a Lê prince, revolted against the Nguyen rule, and asked the French to aid his rebellion.

The French army had diverted most of its forces from Vietnam by 1860 to China against the massive Qing army, leaving only 800 Frenchmen and 100 Spanish facing against 10,000 Vietnamese led by Nguyen Tri Phuong. However, the hesitant Vietnamese made no move against the besieged and outnumbered Franco-Spanish forces. In February 1861, new French reinforcements of 3,500 troops and 70 warships led by General de Vassoigne arrived, broke through the Vietnamese line, and captured the Ky Hoa citadel, six kilometers away from Saigon. French forces then took Bien Hoa, My Tho, and Dinh Tuong. Facing the French invasion and internal rebellion, Tự Đức chose to cede three Southern provinces to France in order to deal with the coinciding rebellion. In June 1862, the Treaty of Saigon was signed, resulting in Vietnam losing three rich provinces, Gia Dinh, My Tho, Bien Hoa, and the Poulo Condore Island, and allowing religious freedom along with paying war reparations of 4 million Mexican pesos to France.

=== Annexation of three southwestern provinces (1867) ===
Map showing the territorial evolution of French Indochina.

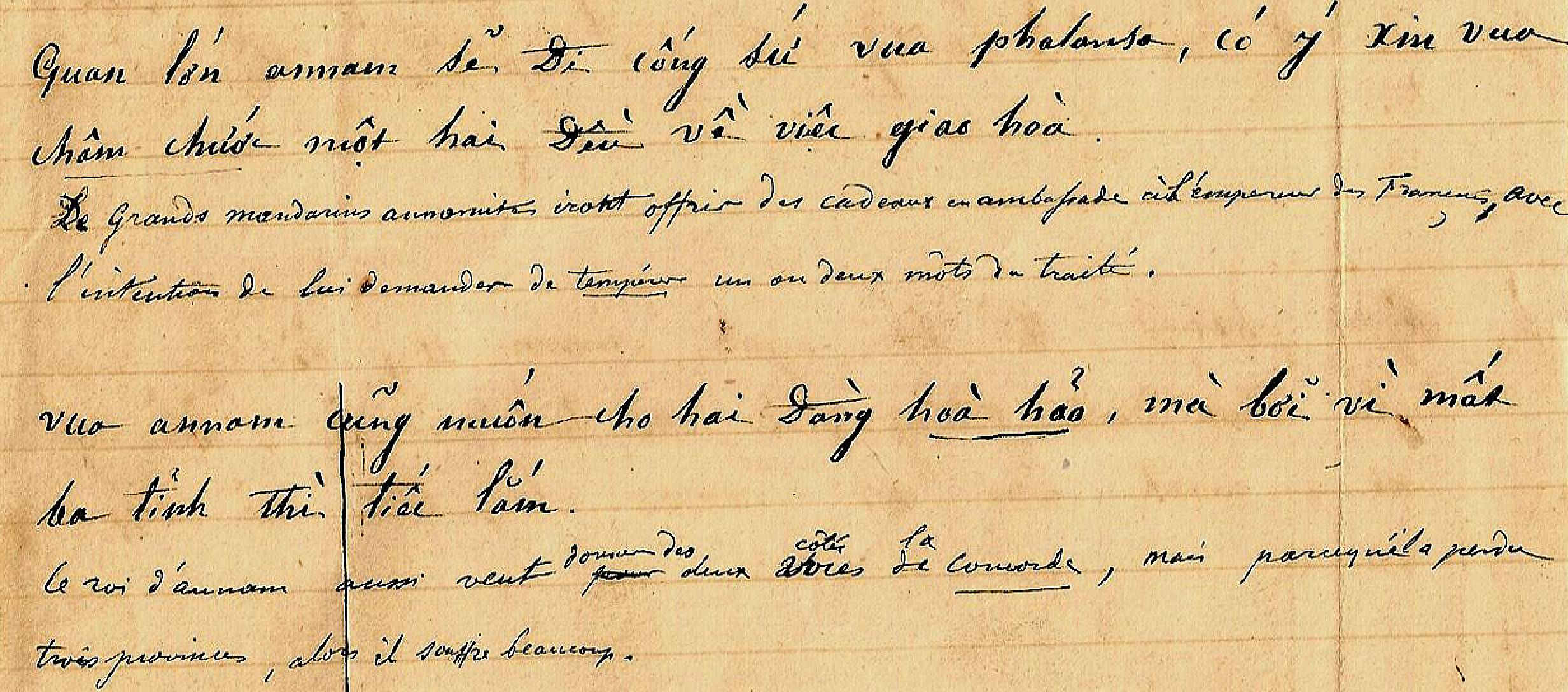
Handwritten letter of Phan Thanh Giản. The French translation is by Henri Rieunier.

Embarrassed with the 1862 treaty as the Vietnamese public viewed it as a national humiliation, Tự Đức sent an embassy led by Phan Thanh Giản–the governor of three southwest provinces–to France in 1863 to revise the treaty. The mission failed as Napoleon III did not accept the Annamite demands. In August 1863, King Norodom of Cambodia signed a protectorate treaty with France, ending the dual Siamese–Vietnamese suzerainty over the country.

In 1866, France convinced Tự Đức to hand over three remaining southwest provinces of Vĩnh Long, Hà Tiên, and Châu Đốc. The governor Phan Thanh Giản immediately resigned. Met with no resistance, in 1867, French troops under de la Grandière annexed the provinces with ease, and put them under the control of French Cochinchina.

=== Tonkin incident (1873–1874) ===
Tonkin, the western designation to northern Vietnam, was rich in mineral and human resources. During the 1860s, pirates, bandits, remnants of the Taiping Rebellion in China, fled to Tonkin and turned Northern Vietnam into a hotbed for their raiding activities. The Vietnamese court was on a deep decline and was unable to fight against the pirates. These Chinese rebels eventually formed their own armies like the Black Flags of Liu Yongfu and cooperated with local Vietnamese officials, who now hired them as mercenaries instead of fighting them due to court power breakdown.

Disturbances in Tonkin attracted French attention. One of them, Jean Dupuis–a French merchant and explorer–decided to plot up the Red River with his own mercenaries and deliver arms to assist Ma Ju-lung in Yunnan fight against these rebels, but was objected by Vietnamese officials. When Dupuis returned to Hanoi in May 1873, his forces were blockaded by the Vietnamese. Dupuis then asked the French Cochinchina governor Marie Jules Dupré for help, while the Vietnamese called them to arrive to eject Dupuis. In November, a French army consisting of 250 marines, sailors, and Cochinchina auxiliaries led by Francis Garnier arrived in Hanoi, with additional orders to demand that the river be opened up to foreign trade. The government of Hanoi refused to talk with the French. Garnier, joined by Dupuis and the Lê loyalists, then bombarded the citadel and took it by surprise on 20 November. The Vietnamese commander of Hanoi, Nguyen Tri Phuong, died following injuries and a hunger strike at age 77. With support from local Vietnamese Catholics who saw the French as liberators, the attackers then captured several strongholds of the Red River Delta with ease. Tự Đức immediately sought to negotiate with the French, but local northern officials ignored him. Prince Hoàng Kế Viêm–governor of Sơn Tây province–called the Black Flags of Liu Yongfu to strike. When the Paris government's instruction arrived in Garnier, he had already been killed and beheaded by the Black Flags on December 21.

On 5 January 1874, captain Philastre and court regent Nguyễn Văn Tường signed and ratified the Philastre agreement, officially ending the Tonkin incident. All hostilities between France and Vietnam and all unsettling situations in Tonkin would cease to exist; France withdraws its army to Haiphong; Vietnamese garrison in Hanoi must be reduced to a simple police force. On 15 March, a second treaty between France and Vietnam was signed by Dupré and Tường: France recognised Vietnam as an independent country, under the protection of France; The emperor of Vietnam, Tự Đức, recognized the former six southern provinces as French territories; France would pay for Vietnam's Spanish debt; Vietnam opened the Red River, Ninh Hai and Thi Nai port to the world, and ensured religious and trade freedom in the entire country.

=== Northern Vietnam and Chinese intervention (1882–1885) ===
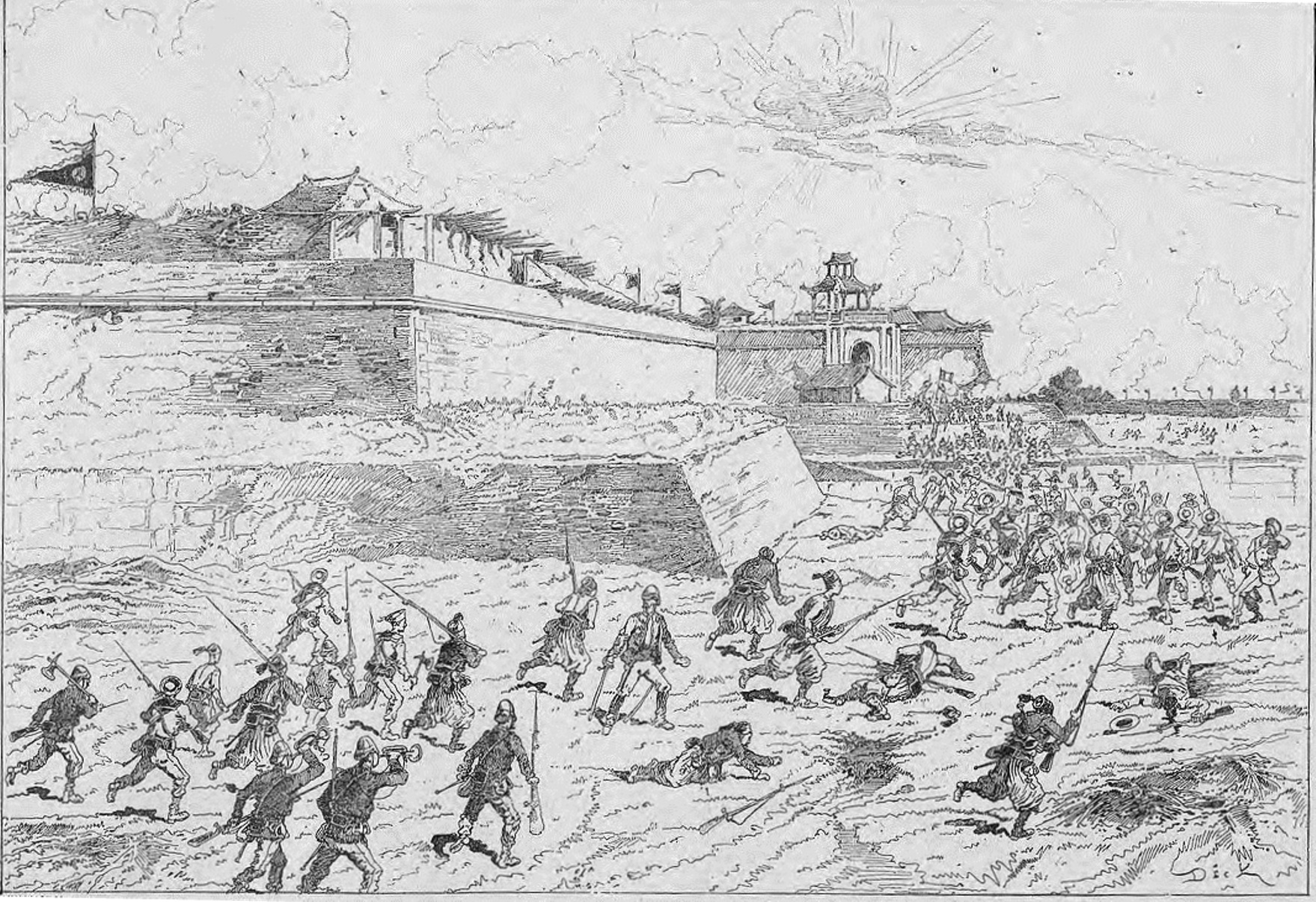
A general assault on Sơn Tây citadel, 16 December 1883

Three years after France had recognised the sovereignty of Vietnam, Tự Đức suddenly renewed the traditional tributary relations with China (the last tributary mission took place in 1849). The 1880s also saw escalating French mobilization and conquest of the whole of Vietnam undertaken by the new Republican Prime Minister of the French Republic Jules Ferry. The Chinese Empire sent 30,000 troops to northern Vietnam in early 1882. France sent its army, led by Henri Rivière, to Hanoi in March and captured it on 25 April. Tự Đức hopelessly informed the Chinese court that their tributary state was being attacked. In September, seventeen Chinese divisions (200,000 men) crossed the Sino-Vietnamese borders and occupied provinces north of the Red River. In February 1883, Giorgios Vlavianos, the Greek-born British subject who had worked for Le Comte de Kergaradec, the French consul of Hanoi, led the surrendered Yellow Flags to join Rivière. On 25 March 1883, Rivière attacked and seized the Hon Gai coal mines. Backed by the Chinese state, Liu Yongfu and the Black Flags decided to attack Rivière. On 19 May 1883, Rivière and his troops were ambushed by the Black Flags and killed at the Second battle of Cầu Giấy. News of the death of Rivière sparked international reactions and triggered anger among the French public. The French Parliament quickly voted for the conquest of Vietnam. On 27 May, the French government sent to the governor of French Cochinchina, said: "France shall take revenge on her brave children." Thousands of French and Chinese troops poured into northern Vietnam.

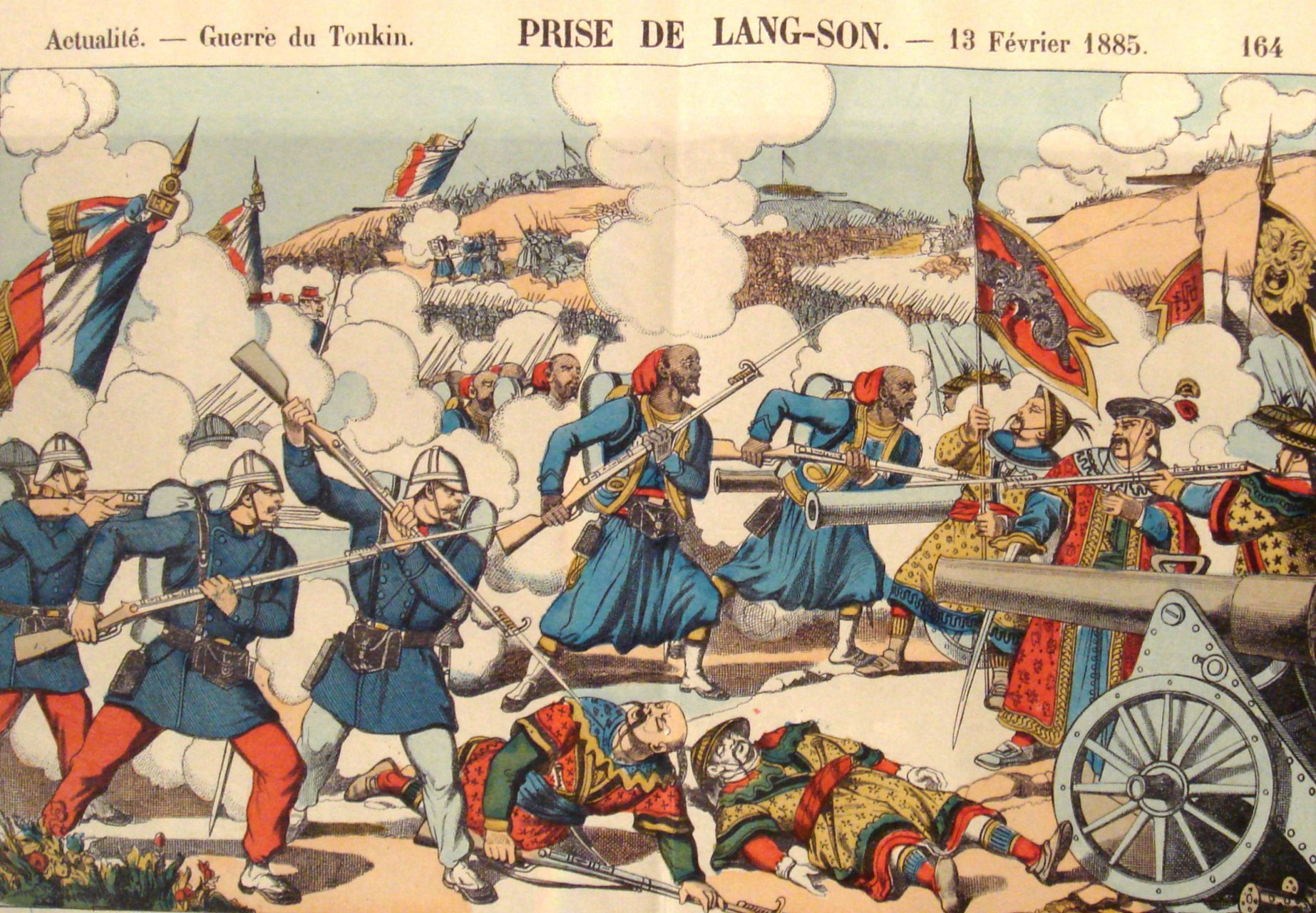
The capture of Lạng Sơn in 1885

To knock the Hue court (who secretly funded the Black Flags) out of the war, the French Republic must force them to accept a new treaty. Tự Đức died on July 17 while his kingdom descended into absolute chaos. The nephew Dục Đức was deposed after has ruled for three days, and Tự Đức's brother Hiệp Hòa was enthroned on 30 July, while the court was dominating by the regency of three powerful ministers: Nguyễn Văn Tường, Tôn Thất Thuyết and Tran Tien Thanh. On 15 August, the French fleet led by Francois-Jules Harmand and Amédée Courbet arrived in Thuận An, the sea gate that leads to the Vietnamese capital of Hue to prepare a direct assault on the ill-protective Vietnamese capital. Harmand demanded the two regents Nguyễn Văn Tường and Tôn Thất Thuyết to surrender Northern Vietnam, North-Central Vietnam (Thanh Hoá, Nghệ An, Hà Tĩnh) and Bình Thuận Province to French possession, and to accept a French résident in Huế who could demand royal audiences. He sent an ultimatum to the regents that "The name Vietnam will no longer exist in history" if they would resist.

On 18 August, French warships began shelling Vietnamese positions in the Thuận An citadel, annihilating all Vietnamese guns. Two days later, at dawn, Courbet and the French landed on the shore. By the next morning, all Vietnamese defenses in Hue were overwhelmed by the French. Hiệp Hòa dispatched mandarin Nguyen Thuong Bac to negotiate. Harmand told them: "You have to choose between war and peace. If you choose war, it will be total destruction of your country. If you choose peace, we are ready to be generous. We do not intend to take your country, but you must accept our protection. This will bring security, peace, and prosperity to Vietnamese people, and it is also the only chance for your monarchy to survive."

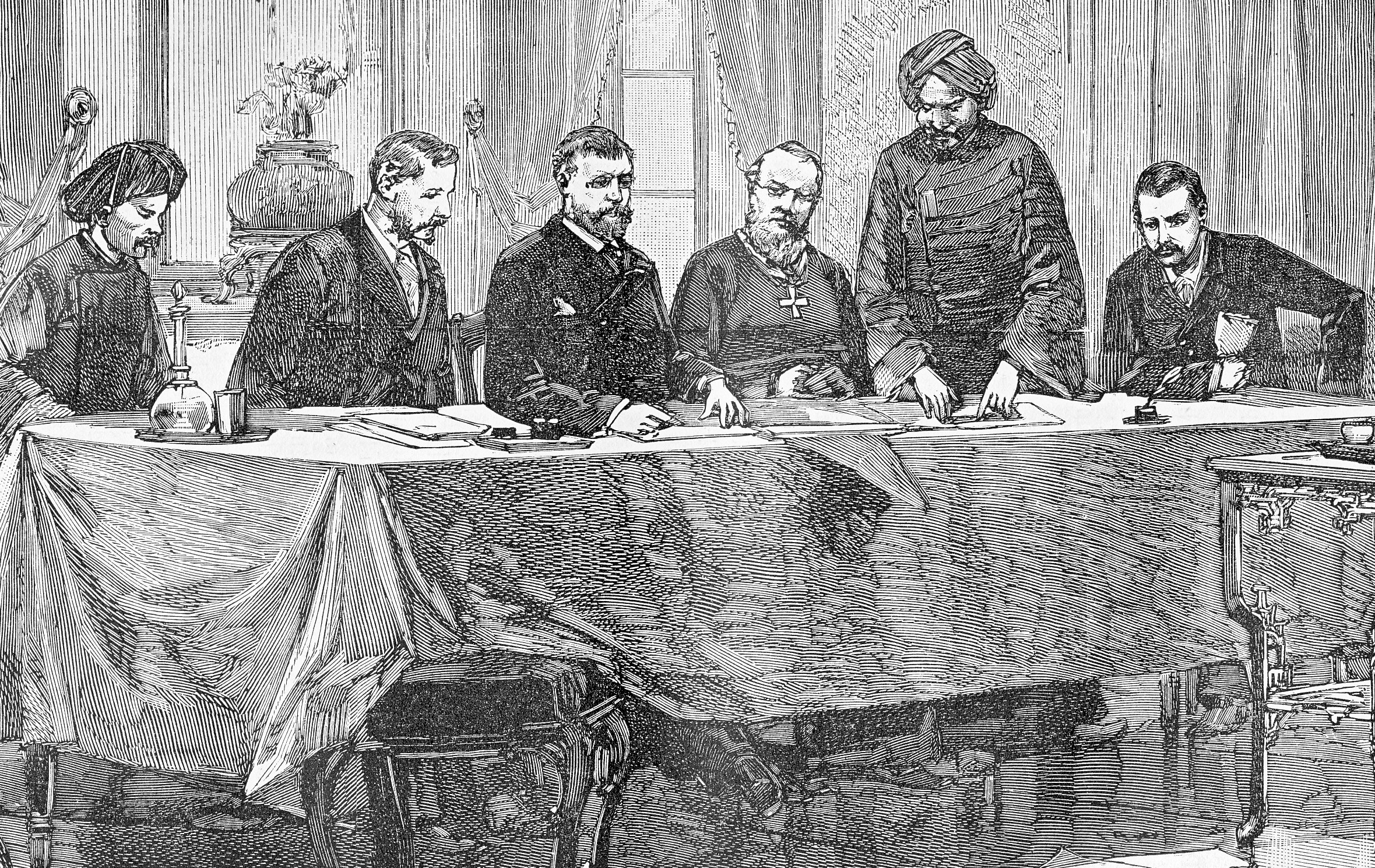
Signing of the Harmand Convention, 25 August 1883.

On 25 August, two court officials Tran Dinh Tuc and Nguyen Trong Hop signed a twenty-seven-article treaty known as Harmand Accord. French seized Bình Thuận; Da Nang, Qui Nhon were opened for trade; the ruling sphere of the Vietnamese monarchy was reduced to Central Vietnam, while Northern Vietnam (Tonkin) became a French Protectorate. However, local Vietnamese forces in the north refused the court's edict to surrender their arms and continued to fight as partisans aligned with the Black Flags and Chinese forces. France had to fight in Tonkin until 1889 to neutralize all Vietnamese resistance. On 6 June 1884, France signed with the Hue court the Patenôtre Treaty, declaring Vietnam a French protectorate, consolidating the French suzerainty over the entire country of Vietnam.

The war now was between the Chinese Empire and the French Republic over the superiority in northern Vietnam. On 14 December 1883, 5,500 French attacked 9,500 Chinese and Black Flags in Sơn Tây, and took the citadel on 17 December. French forces captured Bắc Ninh, Hưng Hóa, and Thái Nguyên citadels in March and April 1884, and arrived at Lạng Sơn in June. In November, the French citadel of Tuyên Quang was besieged by 15,000 Chinese. The siege was lifted in March 1885. Lạng Sơn was finally captured in February by 9,000 French. By spring 1885, the French had driven most of the Chinese army out of northern Vietnam, but had retreated after a French defeat in the Battle of Bang Bo. After the retreat, the French had lost their gains of the Spring Campaign. At the end of the war, more than 42,000 French troops were presented in northern Vietnam. Chinese Foreign Minister Li Hongzhang and Patenotre signed the Tianjin peace treaty between France and China on 9 June 1885, ending the Sino-French war, confirming French overlordship over Indochina, Annam being a French vassal state, and the formation of French Indochina.

== Aftermath ==
=== Royalist insurrections and French pacifications (1885–1895) ===
The Cần Vương movement (save the sovereign) began after the 1885 treaty of Tianjin. It rallied Vietnamese scholar-officials and the aristocracy class that were loyal to the crown and motivated by Confucian ethics to rebel against the establishing French colonial rule. The leaders of the movement, regents Nguyễn Văn Tường and Tôn Thất Thuyết enthroned Nguyễn Ưng Lịch as emperor Hàm Nghi. Tôn Thất Thuyết launched the rebellion against French superior advisor Roussel de Courcy on 4 July 1885. French troops seized the royal citadel and royal treasures on the next day. Tôn Thất Thuyết forced the young emperor, with 5,000 soldiers to flee to the countryside. In September in Hue, de Courcy installed pro-French Đồng Khánh, a brother of Hàm Nghi, as the vassal emperor. Anti-French and anti-Catholic Can Vuong rebellions raged across Tonkin and Annam; more than 40,000 Catholics, 18 French missionaries, 40 Vietnamese pastors were murdered; 9,000 churches were destroyed by angry mobs.

Hàm Nghi was betrayed by a Muong chief who asked for French troops to capture him in a refugee camp in November 1888 and was deported to Algeria. After the emperor had vanished, mandarins and members of the Cần Vương movement gradually surrendered to France, except for a few spearheads that remained to resist: Đề Nắm (killed in 1891); Phan Đình Phùng (killed in 1896); Hoàng Hoa Thám (killed in 1913).

=== Establishment of French Indochina ===
French Indochina was formed on 17 October 1887 from Annam, Tonkin, Cochinchina (which together form modern Vietnam), and the Kingdom of Cambodia. France immediately inherited Vietnamese historic claims to the Lao Kingdoms, which were currently under Siamese suzerainty. By 1889–1892, France began drawing its claims on Laos based on a former Vietnamese territorial extent on Laos during the reign of Minh Mang, in which the Vietnamese never administered them but made them tributary kingdoms, and were currently parts of Siamese suzerainty. In the report Rapport à Monsieur le Gouverneur Général sur les territories du Laos Annamite occupès par les Siamois including a map of Laos to the Governor-General of French Indochina Lanessan on September 7, 1892, locations with Vietnamese names were depicted on the Lao eastern bank of the Mekong, purportedly demonstrating "historical Vietnamese space" and ultimately French possession. France argued that since the Laotian territories belonged to Vietnam during the 1830s, the presence of the Siamese military in those regions was an "illegitimate occupation" and France had "historical rights" to reclaim, guaranteed by force.

In 1893, France sent its warships to Bangkok, demanding that the Siamese king Rama V hand over the suzerainty of Laotian kingdoms to France. The Lao parts incorporated into the French protectorate of Laos, a constitutional territory of French Indochina. In 1907, Thailand ceded three northern Cambodian provinces to the French.

== Gallery ==
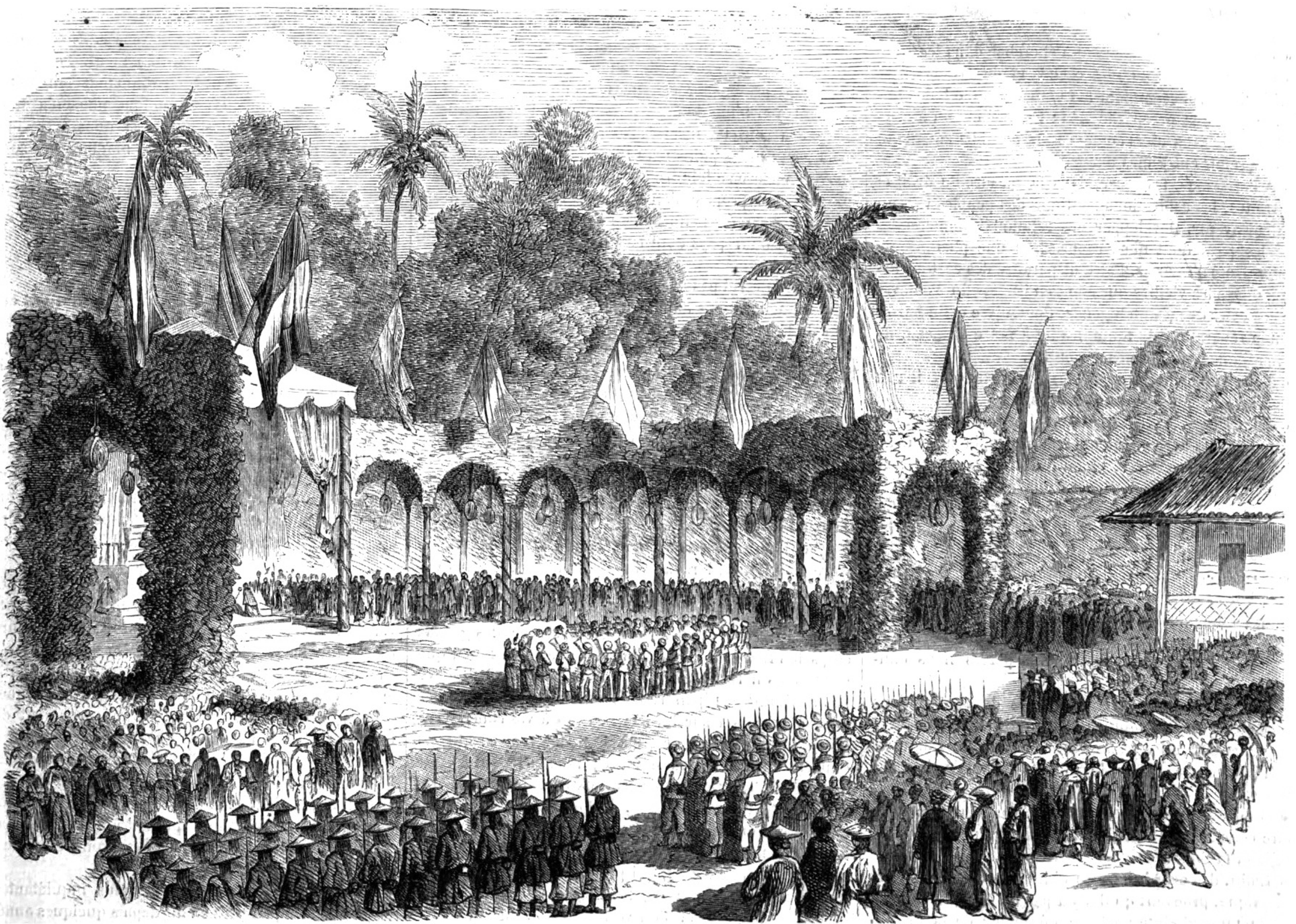
Lithograph engraving Franco-Spanish celebration in Saigon, 1863.

1885 chromolithograph of French victory at Hue

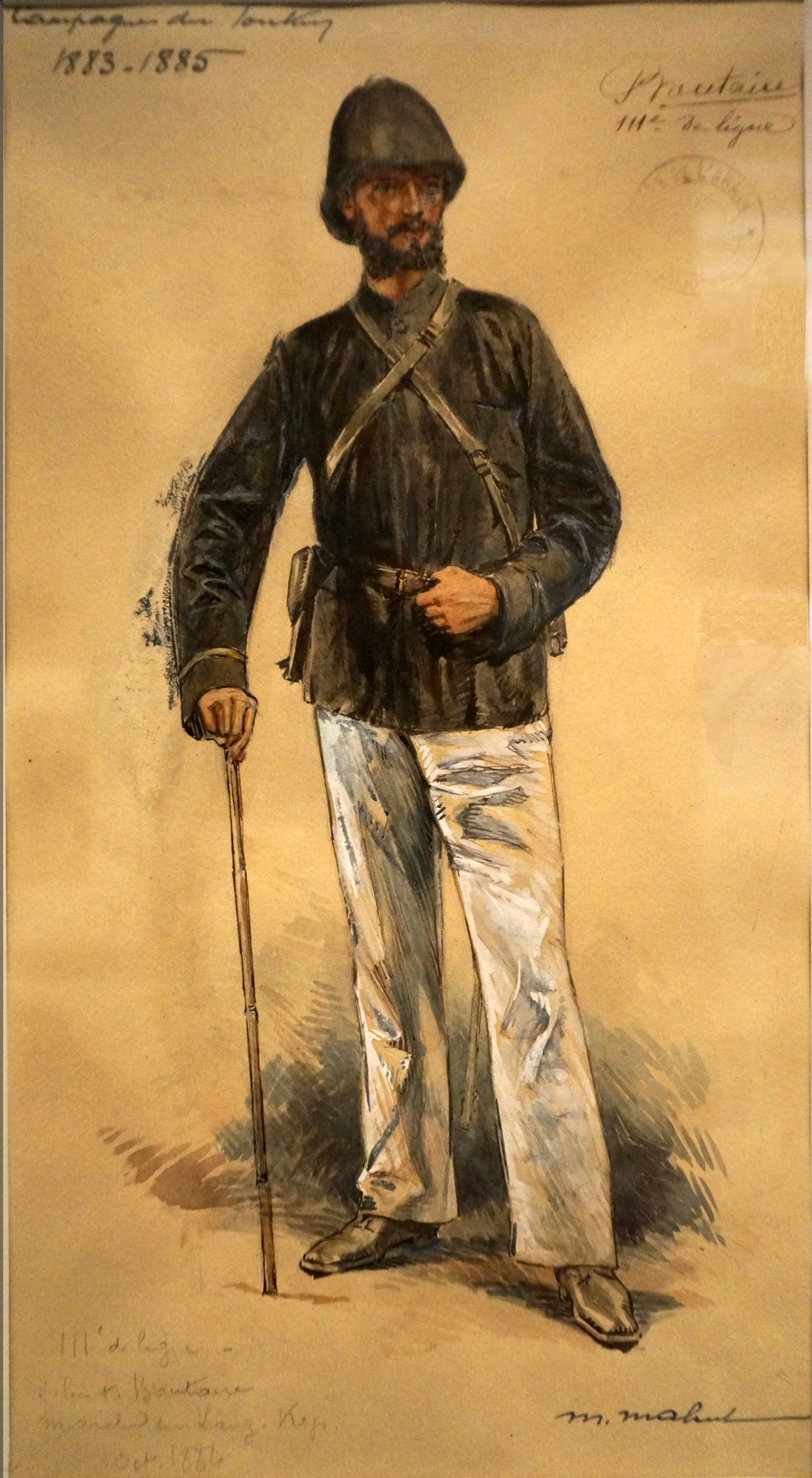
French soldier during Tonkin Campaign

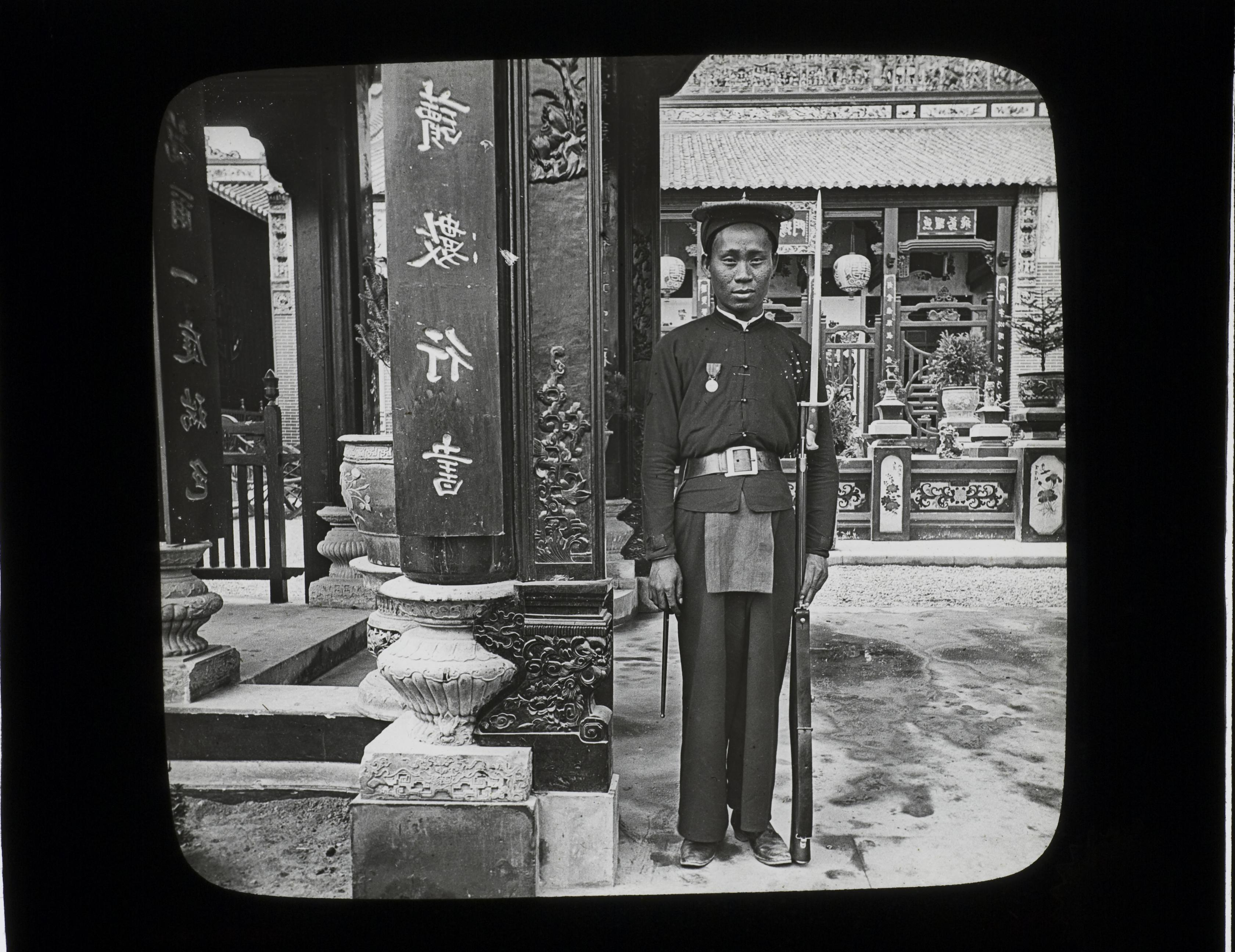
Vietnamese soldier

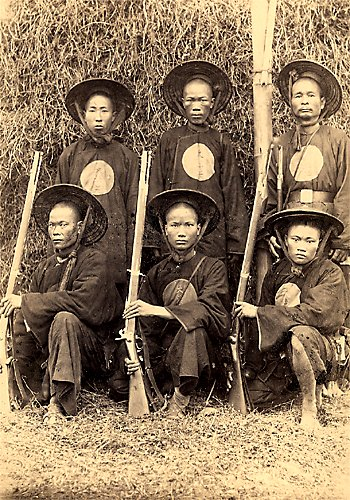
Chinese Yellow Flags soldiers

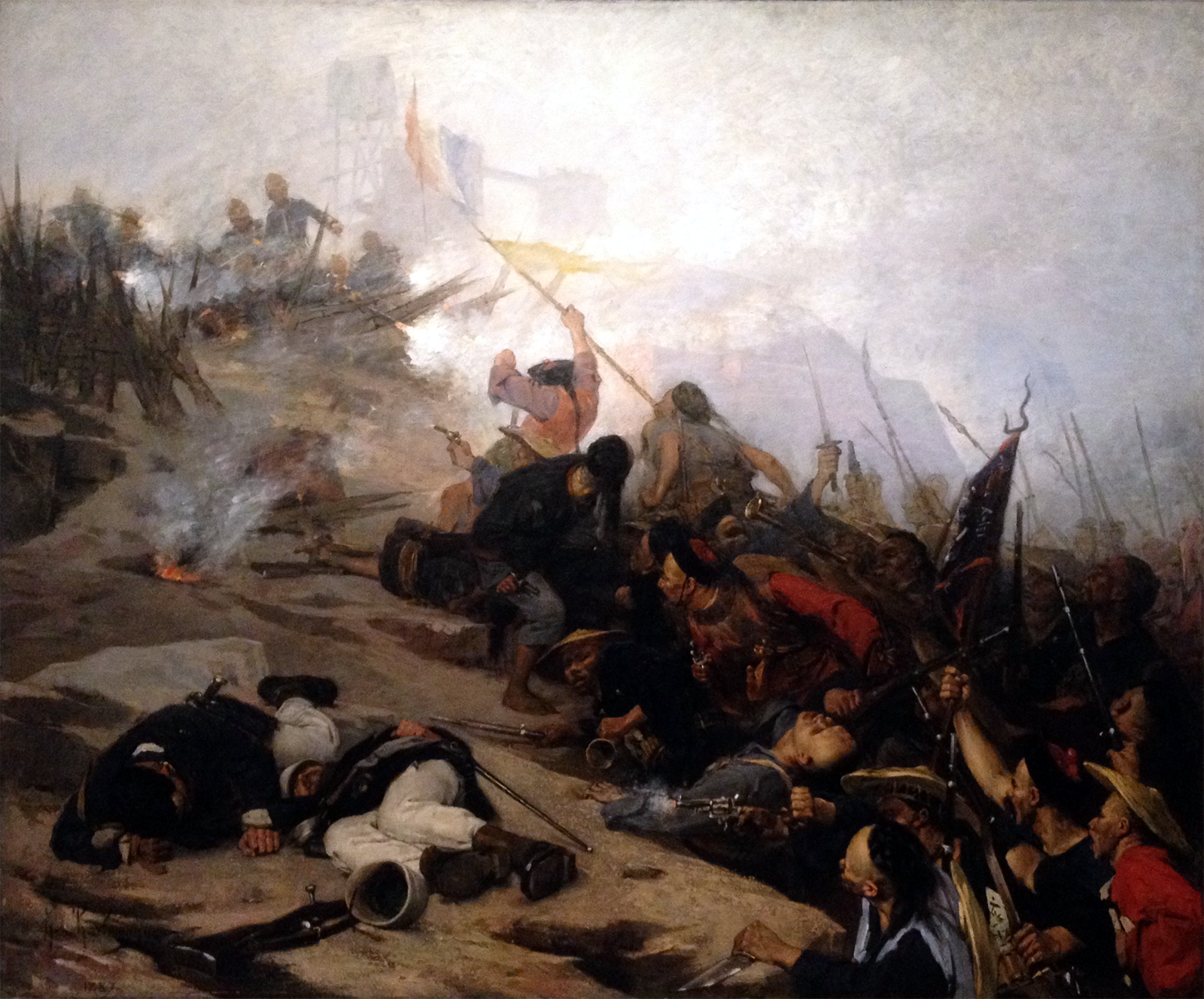
Chinese troops laid siege of Tuyen Quang in 1884

== See also ==
- Anglo-Burmese Wars
- 1893 Franco-Siamese crisis

== Notes ==
1. France's acquisition of Indochina incited violent conflicts and military conquests in Tonkin, Annam, and Cochinchina only (modern-day Vietnam), while the Laos and Cambodia parts were acquired through negotiations.

== Bibliography ==
- Eklöf Amirell, Stefan (2019). Pirates of Empire: Colonisation and Maritime Violence in Southeast Asia. Social Sciences. Cambridge: Cambridge University Press. ISBN 978-1-108-48421-3.
- Davis, Bradley Camp (2017). Imperial Bandits: Outlaws and Rebels in the China-Vietnam Borderlands. Critical dialogues in Southeast Asian studies. Seattle: University of Washington Press. ISBN 978-0-295-99969-2.
- Chapuis, Oscar (2000). The Last Emperors of Vietnam: From Tu Duc to Bao Dai. Contributions in Asian studies. Westport (Conn.); London: Greenwood Press. ISBN 978-0-313-31170-3.
- Goscha, Christopher E. (2016). Vietnam: A New History. New York: Basic Books. ISBN 978-0-465-09436-3.
- Ivarsson, Søren (2008). Creating Laos: The Making of a Lao Space Between Indochina and Siam, 1860-1945. NIAS monographs. Copenhagen: NIAS Press. ISBN 978-87-7694-023-2.
- Keith, Charles (2012). Catholic Vietnam: A Church from Empire to Nation. From Indochina to Vietnam. Berkeley: University of California Press. ISBN 978-0-520-27247-7.
- Mcaleavy, Henry (1968). Black Flags in Vietnam: the story of a Chinese intervention. London: Allen & Unwin. ISBN 978-0-04-951014-2.
- McLeod, Mark W. (1991). The Vietnamese Response to French Intervention, 1862-1874. New York: Praeger. ISBN 978-0-275-93562-7.
- Staunton, Sidney A. (1884). The War in Tong-king: Why the French are in Tong-king, and what they are doing there. Boston: Cupples, Upham & Co. OL 6952582M.
