= Từ Dụ =

Empress Nghi Thiên, Vietnamese empress (1810–1901)

Nghi Thiên Chương Hoàng hậu 儀天章皇后
- Empress Nghi Thiên
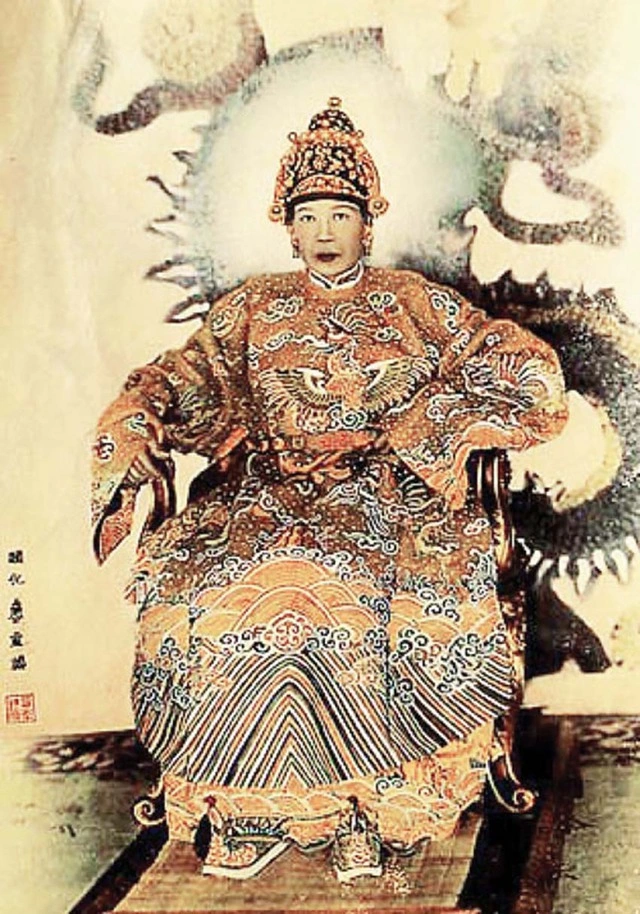

Empress dowager of the Nguyễn dynasty
- Tenure: 1847–1883
- Predecessor: Empress Dowager Thuận Thiên
- Successor: Empress Dowager Trang Ý

Grand Empress dowager of the Nguyễn dynasty
- Tenure: 1885–1889
- Predecessor: Grand Empress Dowager Thuận Thiên
- Successor: Grand Empress Dowager Trang Ý

Great Grand Empress dowager of the Nguyễn dynasty
- Tenure: 1889–1901
- Predecessor: title established
- Successor: title abolished

Empress consort of the Nguyễn dynasty
- Tenure: title granted posthumously
- Predecessor: Empress Tá Thiên
- Successor: Empress Lệ Thiên
- Born: 20 June 1810; Tân Hòa, Vietnam (in modern Tiền Giang Province)
- Died: May 22, 1901 (aged 90); Huế, Vietnam
- Burial: Xương Thọ Lăng
- Spouse: Emperor Thiệu Trị
- Issue: Princess Diên Phúc; Nguyễn Phúc Hồng Nhậm (Emperor Tự Đức); Princess Uyên Ý
Names
- Phạm Thị Hằng (范氏姮)
Posthumous name
- Short: Nghi Thiên Chương Hoàng hậu 儀天章皇后; Full: Nghi Thiên Tán Thánh Từ Dụ Bác Huệ Trai Túc Tuệ Đạt Thọ Đức Nhân Công Chương hoàng hậu 儀天贊聖慈裕博惠齋肅慧達壽德仁功章皇后
- House: Nguyễn (by marriage)
- Father: Phạm Đăng Hưng
- Mother: Lady Phạm

Từ Dụ or Từ Dũ (chữ Hán: 慈裕, 20 June 1810 – 22 May 1901), born Phạm Thị Hằng, was a Vietnamese empress, the wife of Thiệu Trị and mother of Tự Đức.

== Life ==
Hằng was a daughter of mandarin Phạm Đăng Hưng. She was granted the title Empress Dowager Từ Dụ (Vietnamese: Từ Dụ hoàng thái hậu, chữ Hán: 慈裕皇太后) after Tự Đức ascended the throne.

Tự Đức died in 1883. Three regents, Nguyễn Văn Tường, Tôn Thất Thuyết and Trần Tiễn Thành, declared Dục Đức, the eldest adoptive-son of Tự Đức, as the new emperor. Three days later, they deposed Dục Đức and enthroned Hiệp Hòa. Từ Dụ was elevated to the position of one of the "Tam Cung" (三宮) together with Trang Ý and Học phi. Từ Dụ played a significant role in the dethronement of Hiệp Hòa, whom was a pro-French emperor, and enthroned Kiến Phúc.

In 1885, she was granted the title Grand Empress Dowager Từ Dụ (Vietnamese: Từ Dụ thái hoàng thái hậu, chữ Hán: 慈裕太皇太后). Tôn Thất Thuyết decided to launch the Cần Vương movement against French colonists. "Tam Cung" fled to Tomb of Tự Đức together with Emperor Hàm Nghi. Thuyết decided to take them to a mountain base at Tân Sở, and then went to China to hide, asylum and seek reinforcements. "Tam Cung" refused, and came back to state capital Huế.

She was granted the title Great Grand Empress Dowager Từ Dụ (Vietnamese: Từ Dụ thái thái hoàng thái hậu, chữ Hán: 慈裕太太皇太后) by Thành Thái in 1889. She died in 1901, and was given the posthumous name Empress Nghi Thiên.

== Legacy ==
A hospital in Ho Chi Minh City was named after her.
