= Nguyễn Văn Tường =

Vietnamese bureaucrat of the Nguyễn dynasty (1824–1886)

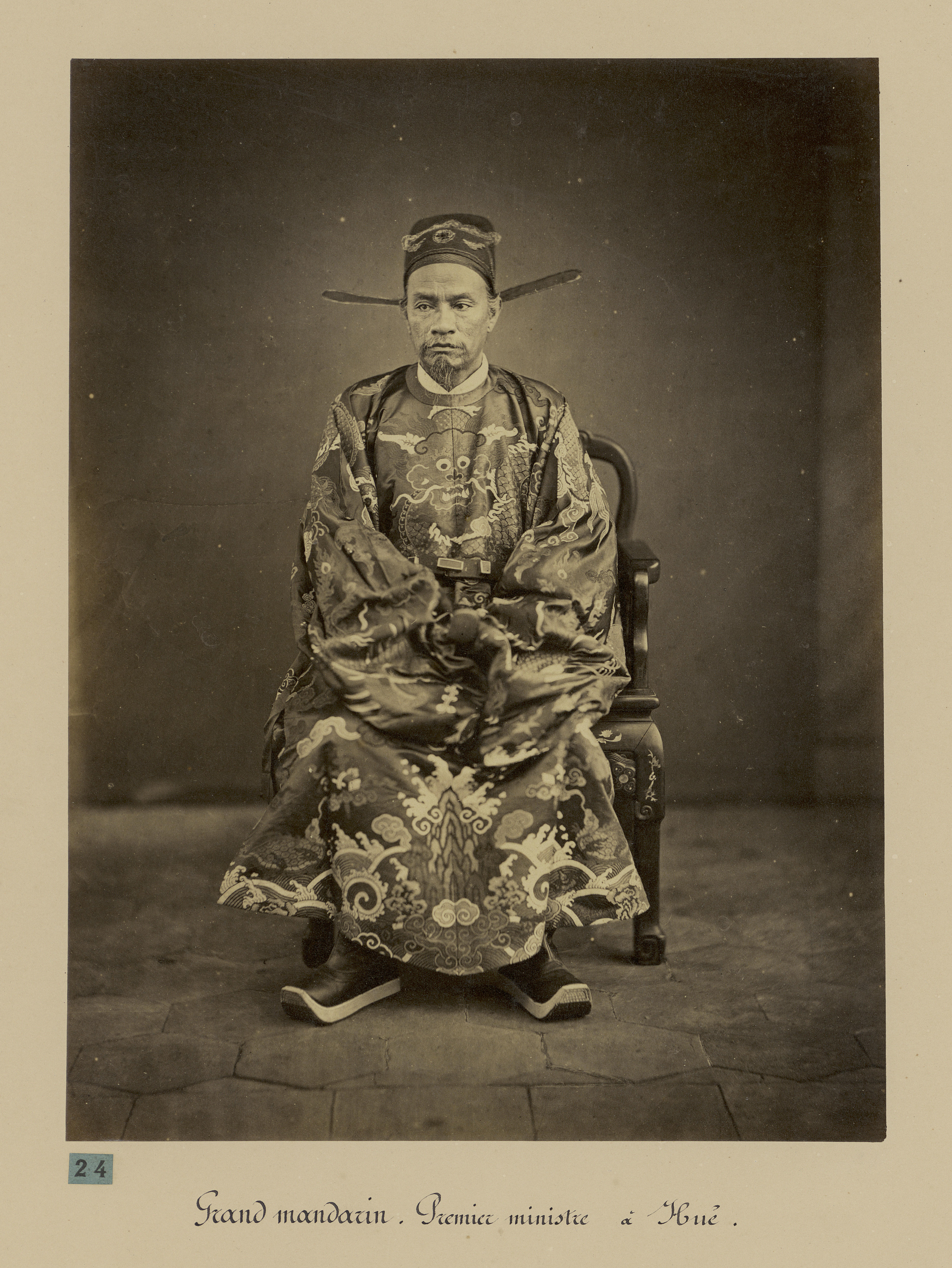
Nguyễn Văn Tường in court dress.

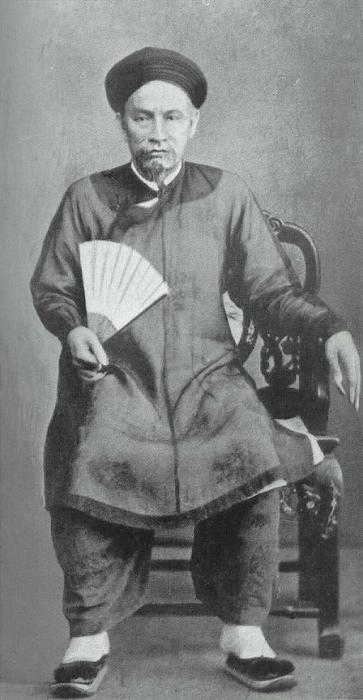
Nguyễn Văn Tường

Nguyễn Văn Tường ( chữ Hán: 阮文祥, 1824–1886) was a mandarin of the Nguyễn dynasty in Vietnam. He is known for installing and dethroning two emperors in 1883–84: Dục Đức and Hiệp Hoà.

== Biography ==
Tường was born in Quảng Trị, in central Vietnam, to a peasant family. His father had been involved in a revolt against the Nguyễn dynasty rule, so he was barred from competing in the national examinations that were used to select mandarins and court officials. On 29 October 1848, Emperor Tự Đức ascended the throne. The imperial records do not record how Tường initially came into contact with Tự Đức, but they do show that under the emperor's protection, Tường was able to pass the national examinations with the highest honours. Private records from Tường's family history indicated that Tường was a (bastard) son of Thiệu Trị, being conceived when Thiệu Trị met Tường's mother during one of the emperor Tự Đức's unofficial journeys through the countryside. In the old days, kings or emperors would occasionally go on trips, sometimes in disguise, in order to assess and gauge their citizens’ life. It was during one of these times that Thiệu Trị met his mother. In 1852, Tường was assigned to serve in the ministry of justice. In accordance with Confucian tradition, following the death of his father in 1862, Tường had to retire for a five-year mourning period before resuming his administrative career.

Since 1858, France had been steadily making inroads into Vietnamese sovereignty. In 1873, Tự Đức gave Tường the responsibility of negotiating with the French. Despite his record of reaching agreements, the French regarded him as a cheat. After signing the Philastre treaty and recovering possession of Hanoi following the attack by Francis Garnier, Tường was promoted to be of Minister of Domestic and Foreign Affairs. In 1881, he became head of the cabinet.

When Tự Đức died, Tường was made regent together with Trần Tiễn Thành and Tôn Thất Thuyết. Thuyết and Tường dominated the court and had much more power than Thành. The regents were not the only ones with power behind the throne. Dowager Empress Từ Dụ, the mother of Tự Đức, along with the two imperial consorts Trang Ý and Học Phi formed what were known as the "Tam Cung" (or "three harems"), a triumvirate which dabbled in palace intrigue. Tường was thought to have had an affair with Học Phi.

Tự Đức had no sons, but he had adopted three of his nephews. Dục Đức was 31 years old and the son of Kien Thoai Vuong, Tự Đức's fourth brother. Chánh Mông (who went on to rule as Đồng Khánh) and Duong Thien (who went on to rule as Kiến Phúc), aged 19 and 14 respectively, were sons of his twenty-sixth brother, Kiên Thái Vương.

According to research by the Vietnamese historian Phạm Văn Sơn, Tự Đức had intended for Kiến Phúc to succeed him, but that the regents installed Dục Đức under pressure from the Tam Cung. Tự Đức had criticized Dục Đức's morality in explaining his appointment of Kiến Phúc, information that the regents deleted from the will at the request of the new monarch. However, the regents were unimpressed by Dục Đức's behaviour after their reprieve and decided to execute him. The treatment of Dục Đức has since raised speculation among historians that it was a vengeance killing due to the monarch's interference in the affair between Tường and Học Phi.

Tường and his colleagues then installed the 37-year-old Hiệp Hoà. However, the new emperor was aware of their faults, so he decided to steer clear of them. As a result, they wanted to dispose of him. Hiệp Hoà then made a deal with the French so that they would protect him, fearful of the regents. However, when the French were absent, the regents put Hiệp Hoà to death. They then replaced him with Kiến Phúc. Kiến Phúc caught Tường with Học Phi and vowed to kill them for their conduct. Học Phi poisoned Phúc's medicine and he died the next day. The rumor about him and a consort stems from a famous piece of French colonial propaganda. French records and historical rumors long claimed that Tường was having a secret affair with Học Phi—one of Emperor Tự Đức’s favorite wives and the adoptive mother of the young Emperor Kiến Phúc. Modern historical research by his own descendants has thoroughly debunked this, proving it was a slanderous story invented by French colonial forces to discredit him. Hàm Nghi was eventually installed as the emperor, and Thuyết decided to launch the Cần Vương movement, an uprising against the French. Thuyết took Hàm Nghi to a mountain base at Tan So, and then went to China to hide and seek reinforcements. In the meantime, the French installed Đồng Khánh on the throne.

The French gave Tường two months to bring Hàm Nghi to heel, and when the boy emperor continued to resist, they deported Tường on 6 September 1885, to Poulo Condore, along with the father of Thuyết, Tôn Thất Dinh. Tường continued to plot while in prison, and was caught sending out instructions for more revolts. The French resident superior seized his property and found 14.5 million piastres.

== Last years and death ==
On 23 November 1885, Tường was deported to Tahiti in the Pacific Ocean where he died in February 1886. In July 1886, his body was returned to his family in Huế.
