= Henri Roussel de Courcy =

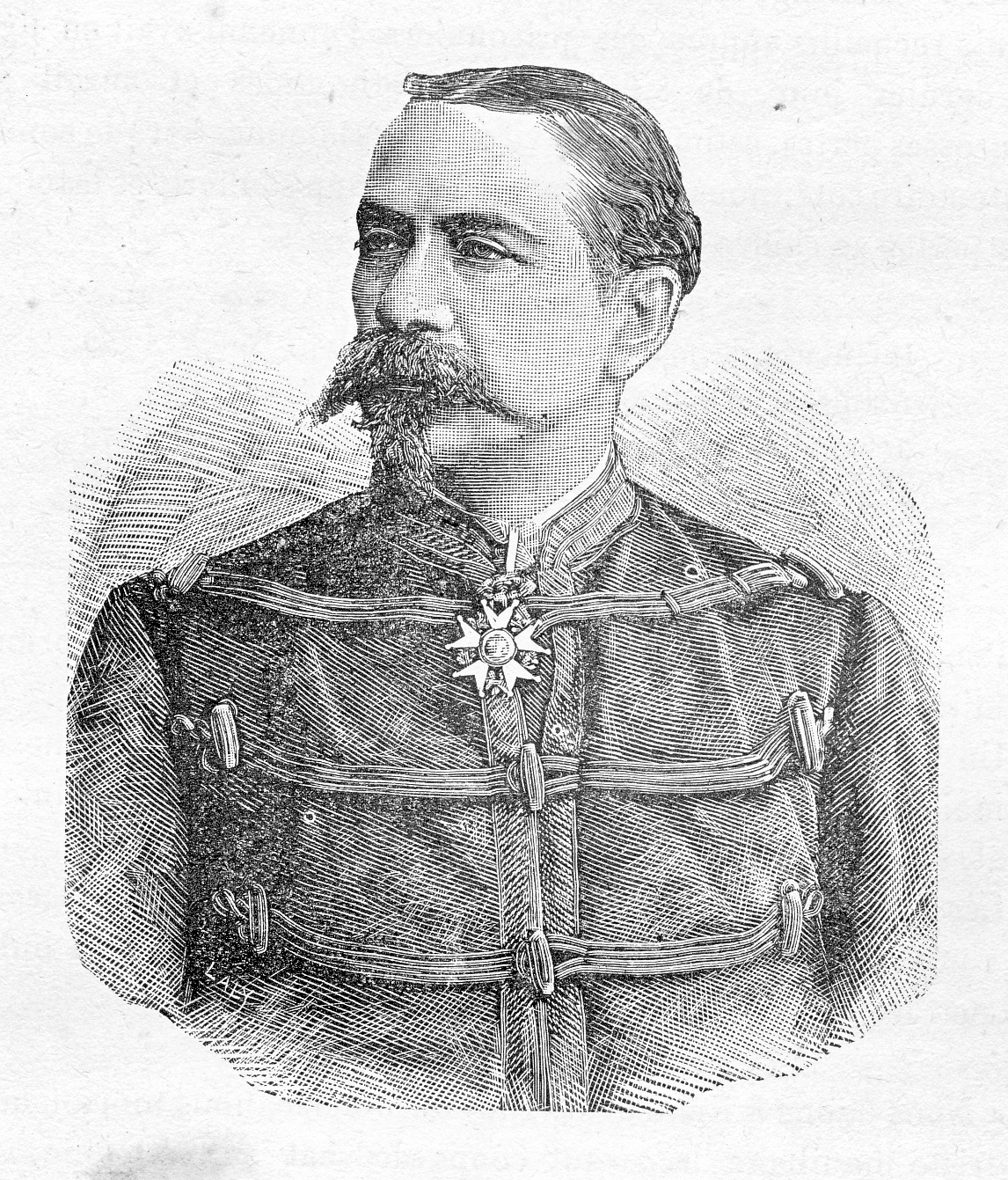
Henri Roussel, Comte de Courcy

Philippe Marie Henri Roussel, count of Courcy (30 May 1827 – 8 November 1887) was a French divisional general.

De Courcy was the governor of Nancy in 1881 which was an important place next to Lorraine.

De Courcy served as the commander of Tonkin Expeditionary Corps and took part in Tonkin Campaign from 1885 to 1887.

He was appointed Protector of Annam. When he arrived at Huế on July 3, 1885, de Courcy summoned Nguyễn Văn Tường and Tôn Thất Thuyết, both were regents of Vietnamese royal court, to his residence for a discussion on the presentation of his credentials to the Emperor Hàm Nghi. Thuyết was inarticulate and was absence on the plea of sick. Tường was good at diplomatic parlance and came to meet de Courcy. After being told that Thuyết was sick, de Courcy's response was that he should have attended the meeting regardless and threatened to arrest him. During the discussion, de Courcy demanded that the central gate should be opened to let French troops go through, and that the Emperor would have to come down from his throne to greet him. Tường replied it was against the principles of Confucianism rite, and demanded that French soldiers should go through side gates, but was rejected by him. Empress Dowager Từ Dụ sent gifts to de Courcy in order to persuade him but was also rejected. Thuyết launched a failure ambush against French and was defeated by him. Thuyết and Hàm Nghi escaped from Huế and took refuge in a mountainous military base in Tân Sở. There, Hàm Nghi called on his people to revolt against French colonists. A large-scale Vietnamese insurgency which now called Cần Vương movement spread throughout the whole Vietnam until 1889.

During the emperor's absence, de Courcy appointed Nguyễn Phúc Miên Định (Prince Thọ Xuân) as puppet "Prince Regent" (giám quốc), and appointed Nguyễn Hữu Độ, Phan Đình Bình, Nguyễn Văn Tường as Grand Secretaries. In September, he exiled Tường to Poulo Condore, and installed Đồng Khánh as the new emperor.

De Courcy failed to put down the Cần Vương insurgency, and was replaced by Paul Bert in April 1886. He came back to France, and died in Paris in the next year.
