= Trang Ý =

Lệ Thiên Anh Hoàng hậu 儷天英皇后
- Empress Lệ Thiên

Imperial Noble Consort of the Nguyễn dynasty
- Tenure: 1870–1883
- Predecessor: None
- Successor: Imperial Noble Consort Nguyễn Hữu Thị Nhàn

Empress mother of the Nguyễn dynasty
- Tenure: 1883–1889
- Predecessor: Empress Mother Từ Dụ
- Successor: Empress Mother Từ Minh

Grand Empress mother of the Nguyễn dynasty
- Tenure: 1889–1902
- Predecessor: Grand Empress Mother Từ Dụ
- Successor: Grand Empress Mother Khôn Nguyên

Empress consort of the Nguyễn dynasty
- Tenure: title granted posthumously
- Predecessor: Empress Nghi Thiên
- Successor: Empress Từ Minh
- Born: 20 June 1828; Lệ Thủy District, Quảng Bình Province, Vietnam
- Died: June 3, 1902 (aged 73); Huế, Vietnam
- Burial: Khiêm lăng
- Spouse: Emperor Tự Đức
- Issue: Dục Đức (adoptive-son)
Names
- Vũ Thị Duyên (武氏緣) or Vũ Thị Hài (武氏諧)
Posthumous name
- Short: Lệ Thiên Anh Hoàng hậu 儷天英皇后; Full: Lệ Thiên Phụ Thánh Trang Ý Thuận Hiếu Cần Thứ Ôn Từ Hiền Minh Tĩnh Thọ Anh hoàng hậu 儷天輔聖莊懿順孝勤恕溫慈賢明靜壽英皇后
- House: Nguyễn Phúc (by marriage)
- Father: Vũ Xuân Cẩn
- Mother: Lady Trần

Trang Ý (chữ Hán: 莊懿, 20 June 1828 – 3 June 1902), born Vũ Thị Hài or Vũ Thị Duyên, was the wife of Tự Đức and adopted-mother of Dục Đức.

She was a daughter of Vũ Xuân Cẩn. She had no child with Tự Đức, and adopted Dục Đức. After Tự Đức's death, she was granted the title Empress Khiêm (Vietnamese: Khiêm Hoàng hậu), and elevated to the position of one of the "Tam Cung" (三宮) together with Từ Dụ and Imperial Dowager Consort Nguyễn Văn Thị Hương.

Tôn Thất Thuyết decided to launch the Cần Vương movement against French colonists. "Tam Cung" fled to Tomb of Tự Đức together with Emperor Hàm Nghi. Thuyết decided to take them to a mountain base at Tân Sở, and then went to China to hide and seek reinforcements. "Tam Cung" refused, and came back to Huế.

She was granted the title Empress Dowager Trang Ý (Vietnamese: Trang Ý hoàng thái hậu) by Đồng Khánh in 1887, and elevated to Grand Empress Dowager Trang Ý (Vietnamese: Trang Ý thái hoàng thái hậu) by Thành Thái in 1889. She died in 1902, and was given the posthumous name Empress Lệ Thiên.
