= Tôn Thất Đính (mandarin) =

Vietnamese official (1812–1893)

Tôn Thất Đính (chữ Hán: 尊室訂, 15 July 1812–5 July 1893) was a Vietnamese mandarin of the Nguyễn dynasty who served under Emperor Tự Đức. He was a descendant of Tôn Thất Hiệp (Nguyễn Phúc Thuần).

Tôn Thất Đính was the governor of Hải Dương Province. He was allowed home in 1864 due to ill health, however, after recovery, his position was never resumed because of his poor eyesight. His son Tôn Thất Thuyết went on to become a high-ranking mandarin, who became the regent upon the death of Tự Đức.

After Thuyết launched the Cần Vương movement that attempted to install the boy Emperor Hàm Nghi as the head of an independent Vietnam, the French colonial authorities captured Đính in an attempt to get his son to capitulate. However, Thuyết continued fighting against French. Tôn Thất Đính and his offspring were banished from the imperial clan. Đính was not allowed to use the surname Tôn Thất, and forced to rename himself Lê Đính (黎訂). Đính was thrown into Côn Đảo Prison together with two mandarins, Nguyễn Văn Tường and Phạm Thận Duật. Later, they were deported to Tahiti in the Pacific Ocean. While on the sea voyage, Duật died, and the authorities threw his body overboard.

Đính was allowed to come back to Vietnam in 1886. He brought the body of Nguyễn Văn Tường back to Huế. He died on 5 July 1893.
