= Hồ Thị Hoa =

Tá Thiên Nhân hoàng hậu 佐天仁皇后

Empress consort of Nguyễn dynasty (posthmous)
- Predecessor: Empress Thuận Thiên
- Successor: Empress Nghi Thiên
- Born: November 30, 1791; Thủ Đức District, Hồ Chí Minh City
- Died: June 28, 1807 (aged 15); Phú Xuân, Việt Nam
- Burial: Hiếu Đông Lăng
- Spouse: Emperor Minh Mạng
- Issue: Nguyễn Phúc Tuyền; Thiệu Trị,
Names
- Hồ Thị Hoa (胡氏華)
Posthumous name
- Tá Thiên Lệ Thánh Đoan Chính Cung Hòa Đốc Khánh Từ Huy Minh Hiền Thuận Đức Nhân hoàng hậu 佐天儷聖端正恭和篤慶慈徽明賢順德仁皇后
- House: Nguyễn dynasty (by marriage)
- Father: Hồ Văn Bôi
- Mother: Hoàng phu nhân

Empress Tá Thiên (Vietnamese: Tá Thiên Nhân hoàng hậu; 佐天仁皇后, 1791–1807), born Hồ Thị Hoa (胡氏華), was the first wife of Nguyễn Phúc Kiểu (future Emperor Minh Mạng) and mother of Nguyễn Phúc Tuyền, future Emperor Thiệu Trị.

== Life ==
=== Gia Long era ===
Hồ Thị Hoa was born in Bình An of Biên Hòa in November 1791. She was a daughter of Nguyễn lord Hồ Văn Bôi. At the age of 14, She married Nguyễn Phúc Đảm, later named Nguyễn Phúc Kiểu, the fourth son of Emperor Gia long. After marriage, she got the favor from Emperor Gia Long and Empress Thuận Thiên, because of her talent and virtue. Emperor Gia long gave her name Thực(實).

On June 15, 1807, She gave birth to the only son Nguyễn Phúc Tuyền, who is the future Emperor Thiệu Trị. However, she died 13 days after childbirth.

=== Minh Mang era ===
Nguyễn Phúc Kiểu began his reign since 1820 and became Emperor Minh Mạng.As his first consort,Hồ Thị Hoa was posthumously honoured as Thuận Đức chiêu nghi (順德昭儀) in the next year. And in 1836, she was posthumously honoured as Thuận Đức Thần phi (順德宸妃).

=== Thieu Tri era ===
Hồ Thị Hoa was honoured as Empress Tá Thiên by her son Nguyễn Phúc Tuyền, Emperor Thiệu Trị. After her death, she was buried at Hiếu Đông Lăng, beside Emperor's tomb Hiếu Lăng.

== Titles ==
- Chiêu nghi／昭儀; (from June 1821)
- Thần phi／宸妃; (from May 1836)
- Tá Thiên Nhân Hoàng hậu (Empress Tá Thiên) ／佐天仁皇后; (from April 1841)

== Issue ==
Nguyễn Phúc Tuyền, Emperor Thiệu Trị
