= Kiến Phúc =

7th emperor of Nguyễn-dynasty Vietnam (1883-84)

Emperor Kiến Phúc 建福帝
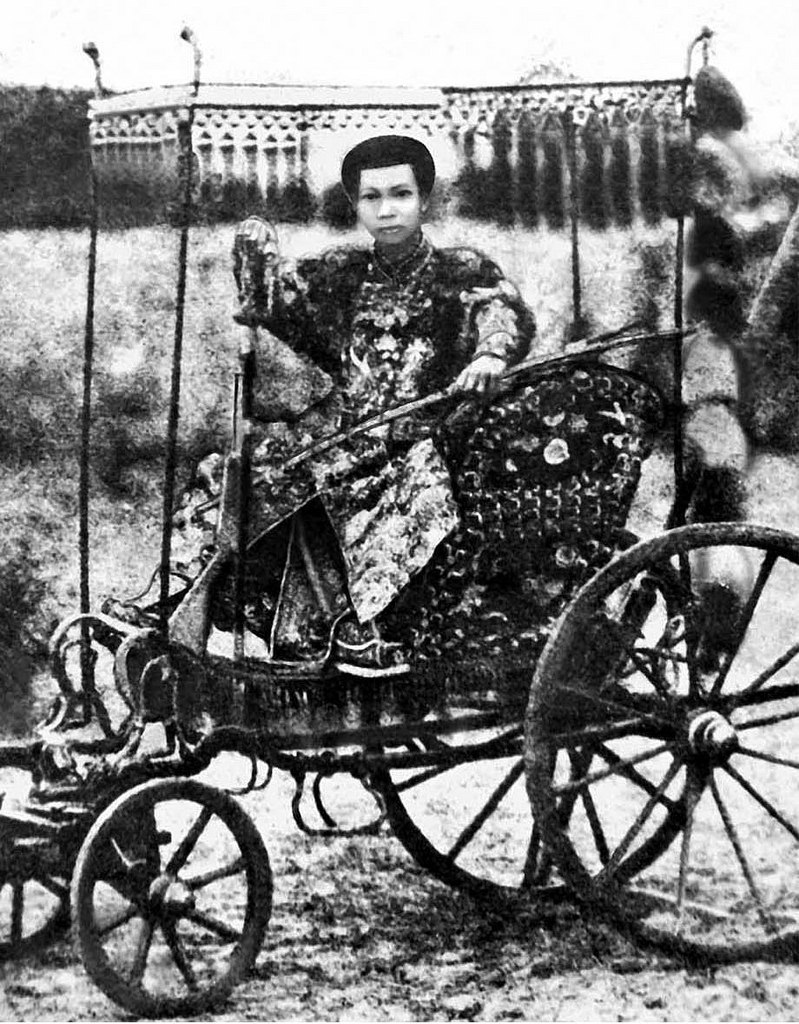
- Picture of Emperor Kiến Phúc dressed in Military uniform

Emperor of Đại Nam
- Reign: 2 December 1883 – 31 July 1884
- Predecessor: Hiệp Hòa
- Successor: Hàm Nghi
- Regent: Tôn Thất Thuyết & Nguyễn Văn Tường

Emperor of the Nguyễn dynasty
- Reign: 2 December 1883 – 31 July 1884
- Predecessor: Hiệp Hòa
- Successor: Hàm Nghi
- Born: February 12, 1869; Imperial City, Huế, Đại Nam
- Died: July 31, 1884 (age 15); Imperial City, Huế, Đại Nam
- Burial: Bồi Lăng (陪陵)
- Spouse: None
- Issue: None
Names
- Nguyễn Phúc Ưng Đăng (阮福膺登); Nguyễn Phước Hạo (阮福昊)
Era name and dates
- Kiến Phúc (建福): 1883–1884
Posthumous name
- Thiệu Đức Chí Hiếu Uyên Duệ Nghị Hoàng đế (绍德止孝渊睿毅皇帝).
Temple name
- Giản Tông (簡宗)
- House: Nguyễn Phúc
- Father: Nguyễn Phúc Hồng Cai (son of Thiệu Trị)
- Mother: Concubine Bùi Thị Thanh
- Religion: Ruism, Buddhism

Kiến Phúc

Vietnamese name
- Vietnamese: Kiến Phúc
- Hán-Nôm: 建福

Kiến Phúc (Hanoi: [kiən˧˦ fʊwk͡p̚˧˦], 12 February 1869 – 31 July 1884) was a child emperor of Vietnam, who reigned for less than 8 months, 1883–1884, as the 7th emperor of the Nguyễn dynasty.

== Biography ==
Born in 1869, also known as Nguyễn Phúc Ưng Đăng, he was the nephew-turned-adopted son of Emperor Tự Đức. He reigned for 7 months and 29 days (2 December 1883 – 31 July 1884).

- Birth name
- Vietnamese alphabet: Nguyễn Phúc Ưng Đăng
- Hán-Nôm: 阮福膺登

Along with his cousin Dục Đức and brother Đồng Khánh, he had been taken in by Tự Đức who was unable to have children of his own. After the regicide of Emperor Hiệp Hoà, the court regents Tôn Thất Thuyết and Nguyễn Văn Tường acted quickly to install the fifteen-year-old prince as the new Emperor. Kiến Phúc was quickly enthroned on 1 December 1883 at five o'clock in the morning.

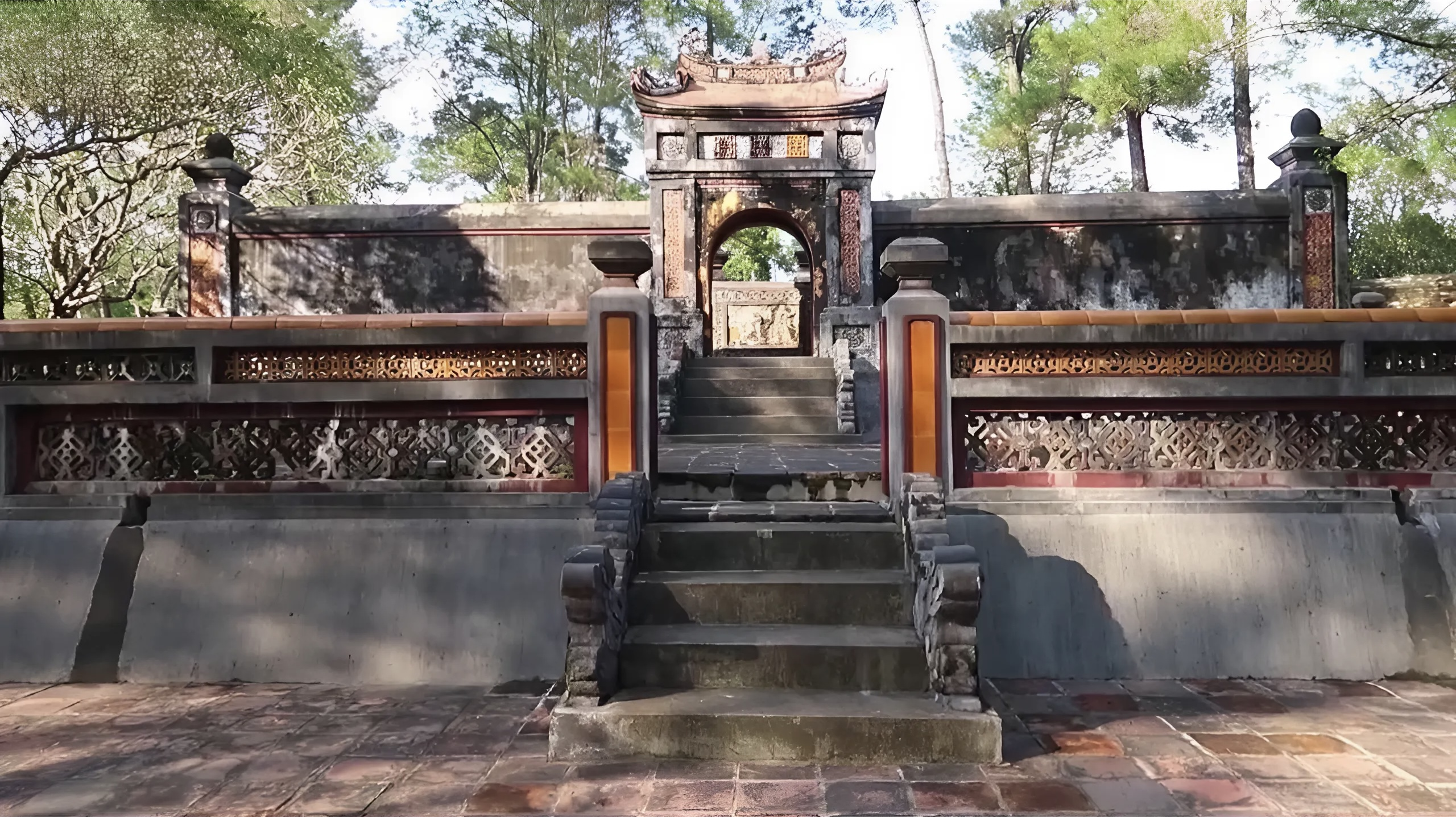
Mausoleum of Kiến Phúc

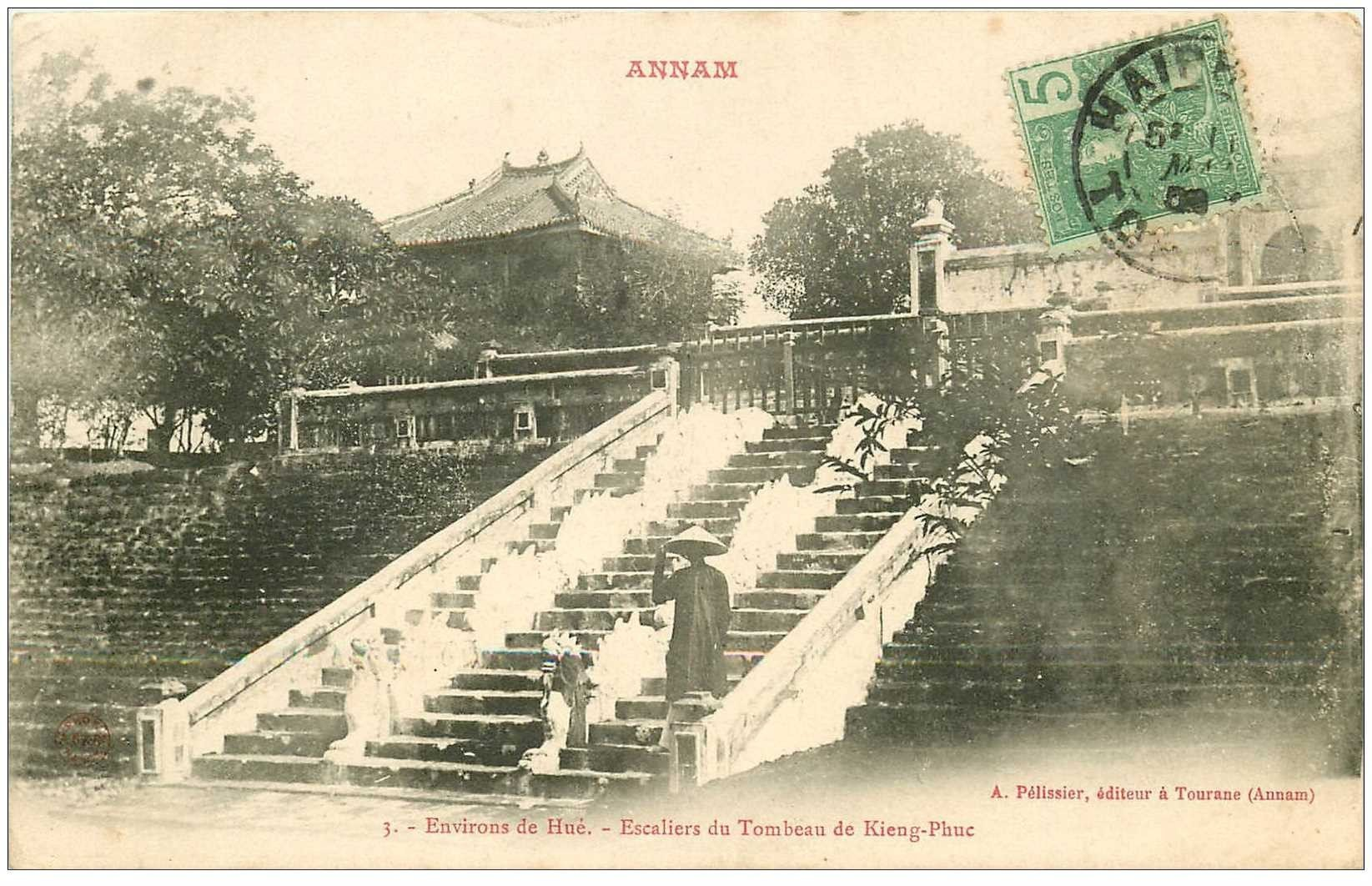
Mausoleum in 1908

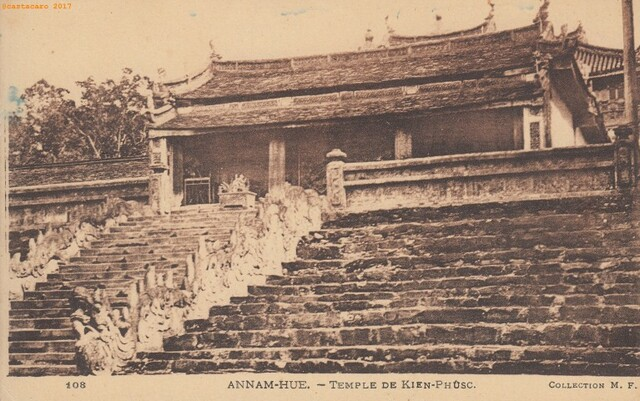
Mausoleum in 1908

Emperor Kiến Phúc was often hampered by poor health and died in Kiến Thành Palace on July 31, 1884 – less than 8 months after ascending the throne. His sudden death sparked rumors that the Emperor was poisoned by his adoptive mother, Tự Đức's Noble Consort Học phi and regent Nguyễn Văn Tường for he knew of their secret affair.

Preceded by Emperor Hiệp Hoà	Nguyễn dynasty	Succeeded by Emperor Hàm Nghi
