= Hiệp Hòa =

6th emperor of Nguyễn-dynasty Vietnam (r. 30 July – 29 November 1883)

Emperor Hiệp Hòa 協和帝
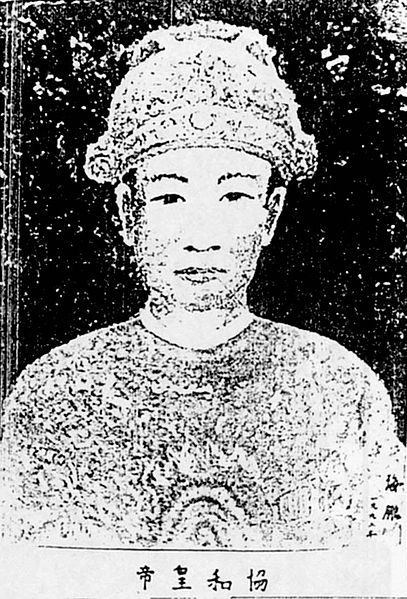

Emperor of Đại Nam
- Reign: 30 July 1883 – 29 November 1883
- Predecessor: Dục Đức
- Successor: Kiến Phúc
- Regent: Tôn Thất Thuyết & Nguyễn Văn Tường

Emperor of the Nguyễn dynasty
- Reign: 30 July 1883 – 29 November 1883
- Predecessor: Dục Đức
- Successor: Kiến Phúc
- Born: November 1, 1847; Imperial City of Huế, Đại Nam
- Died: November 29, 1883 (aged 36); Imperial City of Huế, Đại Nam
- Burial: Hiệp Hoà tomb
- Issue: 17 including 11 sons and 6 daughters
Names
- Nguyễn Phúc Hồng Dật (阮福洪佚); Nguyễn Phúc Thăng (阮福昇)
Era name and dates
- Hiệp Hòa (協和): did not use
Posthumous name
- Văn Lãng Quận Vương (文朗郡王)
Temple name
- None
- House: Nguyễn Phúc
- Father: Thiệu Trị
- Mother: Concubine Trương Thị Thuận
- Religion: Ruism, Buddhism

Hiệp Hòa (Hanoi: [hiəp̚˧˨ʔ hwaː˨˩], chữ Hán: 協和, lit. "harmonization", 1 November 1847 – 29 November 1883), born Nguyễn Phúc Hồng Dật, and later known as Nguyễn Phúc Thăng upon ascending the throne was the sixth Emperor of the Vietnamese Nguyễn dynasty and reigned for 3 months and 10 days, 130 days in total. During his brief reign, he used the era name Hiệp Hòa, and is commonly referred to by this name. He was not granted a temple name and was posthumously conferred the title Prince of Văn Lãng (文朗郡王), with the Posthumous name Trang Cung (莊恭).

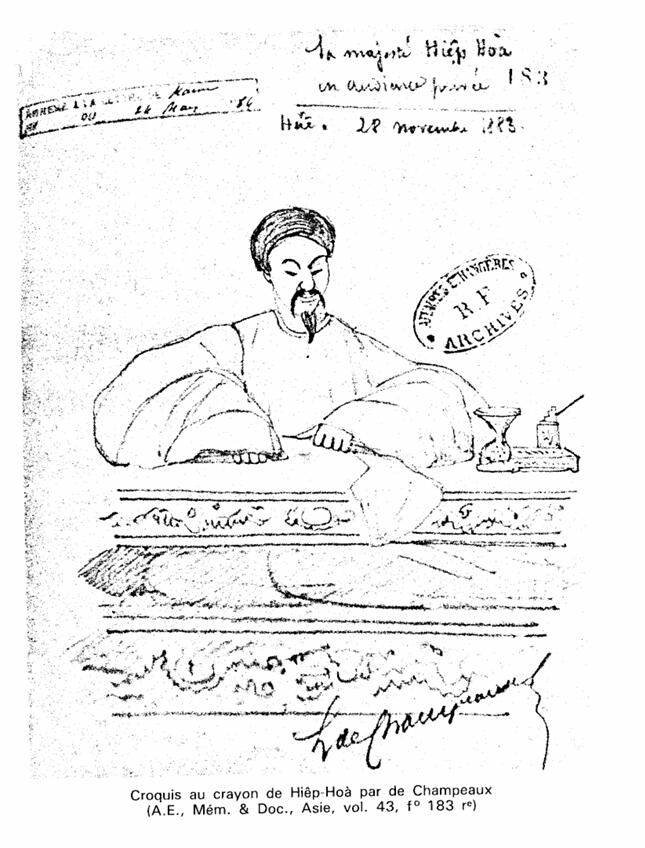
Portrait of Hiệp Hòa by Champeaux

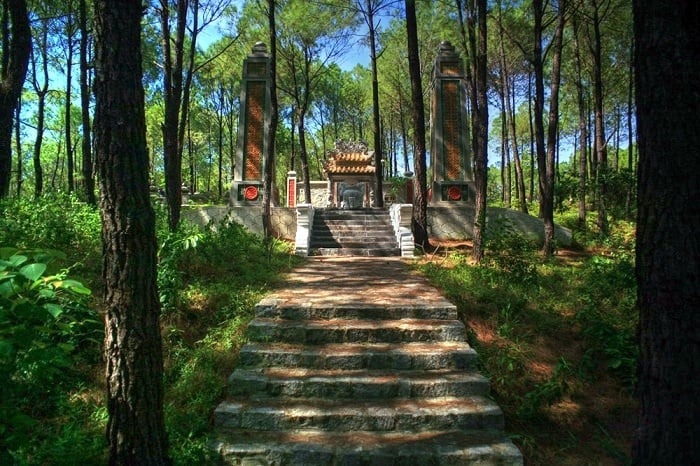
Mausoleum of Hiệp Hòa

== Background and Accession to the Throne ==
Hiệp Hòa’s birth name was Hồng Dật (洪佚). He was the 29th and youngest son of Emperor Thiệu Trị, and his mother a Third-rank imperial concubine, Trương Thị Thận. In the 18th year of Emperor Tự Đức’s reign (1865), Hồng Dật was granted the title Duke of Lãng (Lãng Quốc công, 朗國公) by his elder brother, the emperor. In 1883, Emperor Tự Đức died without a biological heir. According to his will, his adopted son Nguyễn Phúc Ưng Chân (later known as Emperor Dục Đức) was to ascend the throne. However, after just three days of his reign—before he even declared a reign title—the new emperor was accused by two powerful regents of the court, Tôn Thất Thuyết and Nguyễn Văn Tường and was deposed of and sentenced to death. The reasons are officially unclear. Historian, Pham Van Son wrote that Dục Đức embarrassed the court with his debauchery at the coronation that Tôn Thất Thuyết revealed the incriminating sections of Tự Đức's will. The court quickly ruled to execute him with poison for violating the mourning rules and buried him in an unmarked grave, a notably disproportionate sentence. Other contemporary historians make no mention of this episode and say that Dục Đức was not executed but rather was left to die in captivity of starvation, a likelier sequence of events considering that he lived for another three months. With Dục Đức in captivity, the regents named his 34-year-old uncle Hiệp Hòa, as emperor. However, he presided over his nation's defeat by the French Navy at the Battle of Thuận An in August 1883, and on 25 August 1883 he signed the Treaty of Huế which made Vietnam a protectorate of France, ending Vietnam's independence. For this, he was deposed and forced by officials to commit suicide.

Preceded by Dục Đức	Nguyễn dynasty 1883	Succeeded by Kiến Phúc
