= Học phi Nguyễn Thị Hương =

Vietnamese imperial concubine

Nguyễn Thị Hương (阮氏香), also known as Học phi (學妃; lit. Concubine of Learnedness), was a wife of Emperor Tự Đức of the Nguyễn dynasty of Vietnam and adoptive mother of Emperor Kiến Phúc. Following Kiến Phúc's accession to the throne, Hương was elevated to the position of one of the Tam Cung (三宮), three most powerful palace women (Note: The other two are Grand Empress Mother Từ Dụ and Empress Mother Trang Ý, mother and first wife of Emperor Tự Đức, respectively.) who played a significant role in the enthronement and dethronement of Nguyễn Emperors Kiến Phúc, and Hàm Nghi.

After Emperor Kiến Phúc's unexpected death in 1884, there were spreading rumors of her involvement in the incident. According to A. Delvaux, Hương had an affair with Nguyễn Văn Tường - a regent that Tự Đức had appointed to guide his successors. She and Tường were caught together by Emperor Kiến Phúc, who vowed to kill them. On that same night, Học Phi slipped poison into Kiến Phúc's medicine, resulting in the emperor's death. These rumors however, have never been validated by any official document.
