= Từ Minh =

Vietnamese empress (1855–1906)

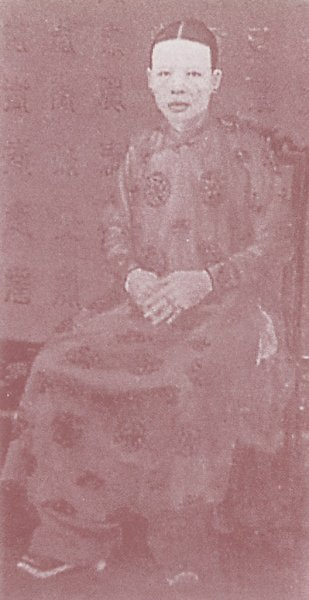
Từ Minh Huệ Hoàng hậu (慈明惠皇后)

Từ Minh (1855–1906) was a Vietnamese empress.

She was the consort of Emperor Dục Đức.

She became the mother of:

- Thành Thái, Emperor 1889-1907.
