= Nguyễn Phúc Hồng Cai =

Prince of Nguyễn dynasty, Vietnam

Nguyễn Phúc Hồng Cai (阮福洪侅, 13 December 1845 – 15 May 1876) was a prince of Nguyễn dynasty, Vietnam. He was the father of three emperors: Kiến Phúc, Đồng Khánh and Hàm Nghi.

Hồng Cai was the twenty-sixth son of Thiệu Trị, and his mother was Trương Thị Vĩnh. He was a filial son and liked studying. He was granted the title Kiên Quốc Công (堅國公, "Duke of Kiên") in 1865. Tự Đức had no child, and adopted Hồng Cai's two sons, Ưng Đăng and Ưng Thị, who later became Emperor Kiến Phúc and Emperor Đồng Khánh respectively.

Hồng Cai died in 1876 and received the posthumous name Thuần Nghị (純毅). He was buried in Hương Thủy.

In 1885, Đồng Khánh ascended the throne, and granted him the title Kiên Vương (堅王, "Prince of Kiên") posthumously. Later, his title was elevated to Kiên Thái Vương (堅太王, "King Father Kiên") in 1888.
