= Nguyễn Phúc Hồng Y =

Nguyễn Phúc Hồng Y (阮福洪依, 11 September 1833 – 23 February 1877) courtesy name Quân Bác (君博), was a prince of Nguyễn dynasty, Vietnam. He was the father of Emperor Dục Đức.

Hồng Y was the fourth son of Emperor Thiệu Trị, and his mother was Nguyễn Thị Xuyên. He was granted the title Kiến Thụy Công (建瑞公, "Duke of Kiến Thụy") in 1846. He undertook a wide range of learning and had talents in literature. He often exchanged poems with Emperor Tự Đức, Prince Miên Thẩm and Prince Miên Trinh. Tự Đức had no child, and adopted Hồng Y's second son Ưng Ái, whom later became the Emperor Dục Đức.

Hồng Y died in 1877. He was granted the title Kiến Thụy Quận Vương (建瑞郡王, "Provincial Prince Kiến Thụy") and received the posthumous name Tuệ Đạt (慧達).

In 1889, his grandson Thành Thái ascended the throne, and granted him the title Thụy Thái Vương (瑞太王, "King Father Thụy"), and changed his posthumous name to Đôn Chính (敦正).
