= Dục Đức =

Emperor of Vietnam (reigned 20–23 July 1883)

Emperor Dục Đức 育德帝
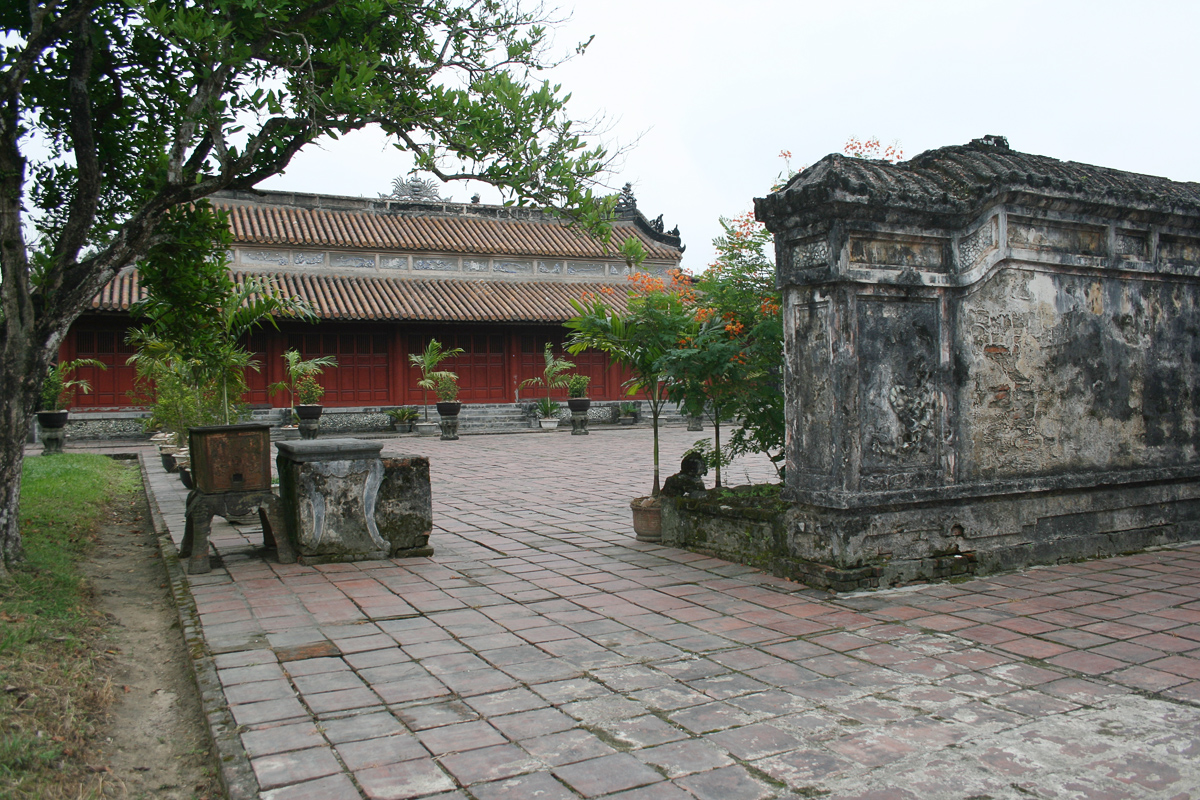
- Tomb of Dục Đức in Huế

Emperor of Đại Nam
- Reign: 20 July 1883 – 23 July 1883
- Predecessor: Tự Đức
- Successor: Hiệp Hòa
- Regent: Tôn Thất Thuyết, Nguyễn Văn Tường & Trần Tiễn Thành

Emperor of the Nguyễn dynasty
- Reign: 20 July 1883 – 23 July 1883
- Predecessor: Tự Đức
- Successor: Hiệp Hòa
- Born: 23 February 1852; Imperial City, Huế, Đại Nam
- Died: 6 October 1883 (aged 31); Imperial City, Huế, Đại Nam
- Burial: An Lăng (安陵)
- Spouse: Empress Từ Minh
- Issue: 19 including 11 sons and 8 daughters Nguyễn Phúc Bửu Lân
Names
- Nguyễn Phúc Ưng Ái (阮福膺𩡤)
Era dates
- Tự Đức (嗣德)(remain unchanged)
Posthumous name
- Khoan nhân Duệ triết Tĩnh minh Huệ hoàng đế (寬仁睿哲靜明惠皇帝)
Temple name
- Cung Tông (恭宗)
- House: Nguyễn Phúc
- Father: Nguyễn Phúc Hồng Y (son of Thiệu Trị)
- Mother: Trần Thị Nga
- Religion: Ruism, Buddhism

Dục Đức (chữ Hán: 育德, IPA: [zùkp ɗɨ́k]; born Nguyễn Phúc Ưng Ái, 23 February 1852 – 6 October 1883), was emperor of Vietnam for three days, from 20 to 23 July 1883. He was the fifth emperor of the Nguyễn dynasty and father of Emperor Thành Thái, who ruled from 1889 to 1907.

== Early life ==
Dục Đức was born Nguyễn Phúc Ưng Ái and at age 17 was renamed Nguyễn Phúc Ưng Chân (阮福膺禛). He was the second son of Nguyễn Phúc Hồng Y, the fourth brother of Emperor Tự Đức. He and his two cousins, Chanh Mong (later Emperor Đồng Khánh) and Duong Thien (Kiến Phúc), sons of Tự Đức's twenty-sixth brother Thien Thai Vuong, were adopted by the emperor, who had no children of his own.

After Tự Đức's death, his three regents, Nguyễn Văn Tường, Tôn Thất Thuyết and Tran Tien Thanh, declared the thirty-one-year-old Dục Đức would succeed him. This move was evidently controversial. Historian Pham Van Son and others write that Tự Đức had determined Dục Đức too decadent to rule, and amended his will to name Kiến Phúc as his successor instead. However, the Tam Cung, an alliance of powerful palace women, favored Dục Đức, and convinced the regents to alter the will and appoint him Emperor.

== Reign and death ==
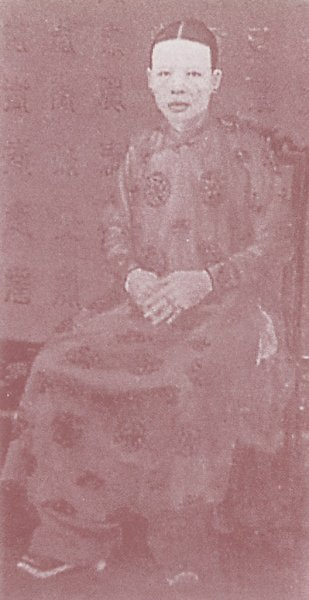
Empress Minh Huệ, wife of Dục Đức and biological mother of Thành Thái

Dục Đức ruled for only three days before he was deposed and sentenced to death by the same regents who had enthroned him. The reasons are unclear. Pham Van Son wrote that Dục Đức so embarrassed the court with his debauchery at the coronation that Tôn Thất Thuyết revealed the incriminating sections of Tự Đức's will. The court quickly ruled to execute him with poison for violating the mourning rules and buried him in an unmarked grave, a notably disproportionate sentence. Other contemporary historians make no mention of this episode and say that Dục Đức was not executed but rather was left to die in captivity, a likelier sequence of events considering that he lived for another three months. The true motivation for the overthrow may have been political; the regents may have feared Dục Đức would strip them of the power they enjoyed under the weak Tự Đức.

With Dục Đức in captivity, the regents named his 34-year-old uncle Hiệp Hòa, Tự Đức's half-brother, as emperor. They may have skipped over Dục Đức's adoptive brothers to mitigate the backlash from the court women who had favored Dục Đức. Open protest of the regents' actions came from one senior official, Phan Đình Phùng, but he was quickly arrested and stripped of his position. During his brief reign, Hiệp Hòa similarly tried to rein in the regents' influence, but failed; he in turn was soon deposed and sentenced to die. Modern Vietnamese historians generally regard emperors from Dục Đức to Bảo Đại as puppets controlled by the French colonialists.

After several more years of turmoil, Dục Đức's young son Thành Thái was installed as emperor in 1889. He constructed a mausoleum and shrine complex for his father in Huế known as the Tomb of Dục Đức. This eventually became a family tomb, housing Thành Thái and various other members of the Nguyễn dynasty.

Preceded by Emperor Tự Đức	Nguyễn dynasty	Succeeded by Emperor Hiệp Hoà
