= Tân Sở =

Tân Sở citadel was a secret military base in central Vietnam that was built in the 1880s. It was built up by Tôn Thất Thuyết, the regent of the Nguyễn dynasty, in preparation for an uprising against French colonialism.
