= Thiệu Trị =

Emperor Thiệu Trị 紹治帝
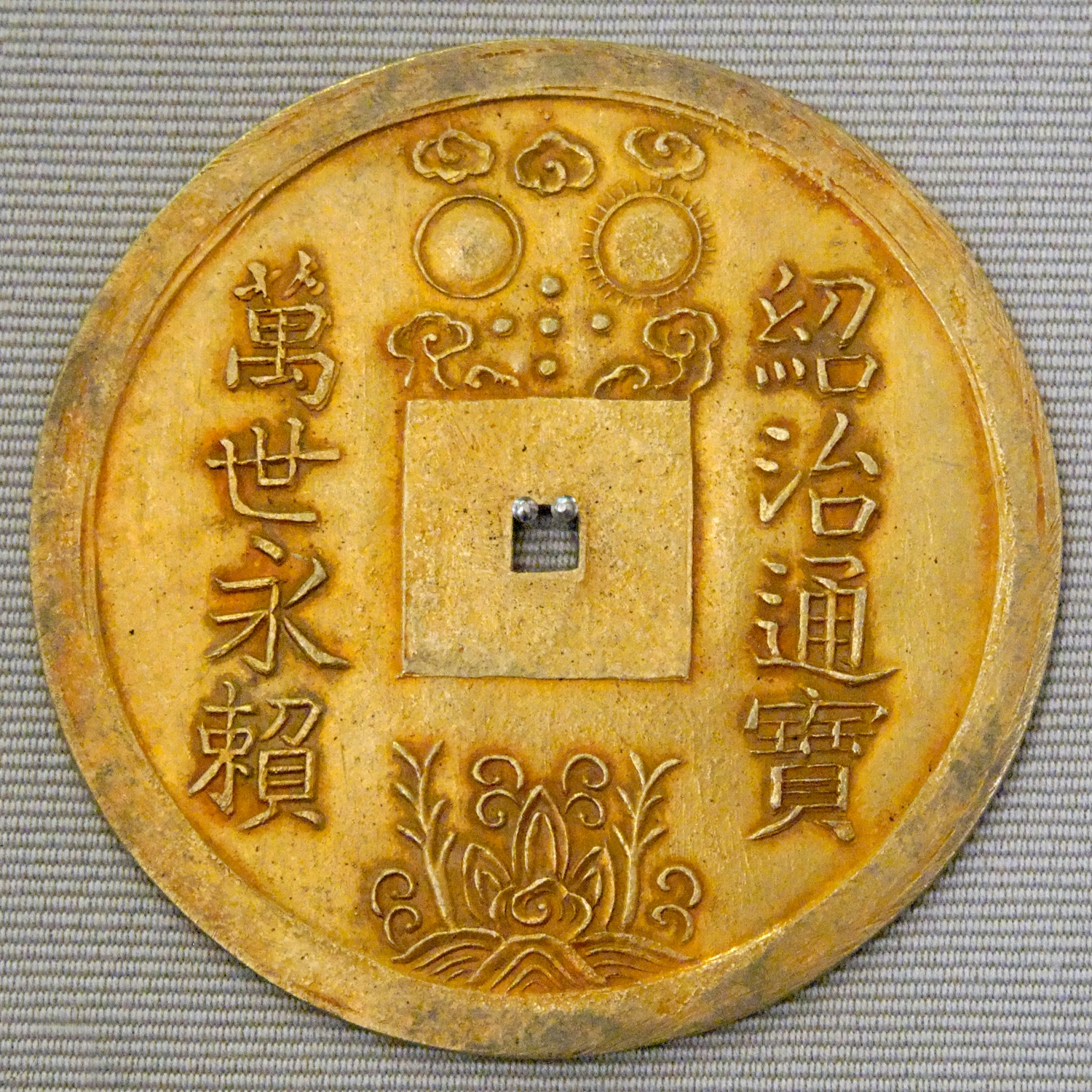
- Gold coin of Emperor Thieu Tri's reign

Emperor of Đại Nam
- Reign: 11 February 1841 – 4 November 1847
- Predecessor: Minh Mạng
- Successor: Tự Đức

Emperor of the Nguyễn dynasty
- Reign: 11 February 1841 – 4 November 1847
- Predecessor: Minh Mạng
- Successor: Tự Đức
- Born: 16 June 1807; Imperial City, Huế, Việt Nam
- Died: 4 November 1847 (aged 40); Imperial City, Huế, Đại Nam
- Burial: Xương Lăng, Huế
- Spouse: Empress Từ Dụ more than 200 concubines
- Issue: 64 including 29 princes and 35 princesses, including: Nguyễn Phúc Hồng Bảo; Nguyễn Phúc Hồng Nhậm; Nguyễn Phúc Hồng Y Nguyễn Phúc Hồng Cai
Names
- Nguyễn Phúc Miên Tông (阮福綿宗); Nguyễn Phúc Tuyền (阮福暶)
Era name and dates
- Thiệu Trị (紹治): 1841–1847
Posthumous name
- Thiệu thiên Long vận Chí thiện Thuần hiếu Khoan minh Duệ đoán Văn trị Vũ công Thánh triết Chương Hoàng đế (紹天隆運至善純孝寬明睿斷文治武功聖哲章皇帝)
Temple name
- Hiến Tổ (憲祖)
- House: Nguyễn Phúc
- Father: Minh Mạng
- Mother: Empress Tá Thiên
- Religion: Ruism, Buddhism

Thiệu Trị (Hanoi: [tʰiəw˧˨ʔ t͡ɕi˧˨ʔ], chữ Hán: 紹治, lit. "inheritance of prosperity"; 6 June 1807 – 4 November 1847), personal name Nguyễn Phúc Miên Tông or Nguyễn Phúc Tuyền, was the third emperor of the Nguyễn dynasty. He was the eldest son of Emperor Minh Mạng, and reigned from 14 February 1841 until his death on 4 November 1847. He died at the age of 41, according to some reports, of apoplexy. He was interred in the Xương Lăng tomb (also known as the Tomb of Thiệu Trị) located in Huế, which was completed by his son and successor, Emperor Tự Đức.

== Biography ==
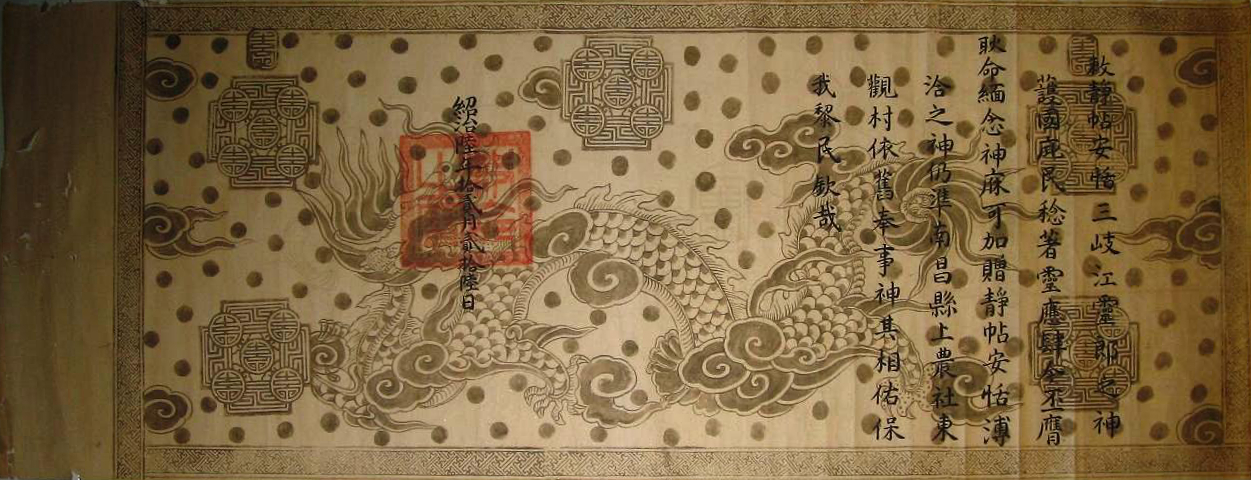
Imperial edict of emperor Thiệu Trị (written in Classical Chinese)

Emperor Thiệu Trị was much like his father, Minh Mạng, and carried on his conservative policies of isolationism and the entrenchment of Confucianism. Highly educated in the Confucian tradition, Thiệu Trị had some curiosity about the West, but like his father was very suspicious of all non-Vietnamese outsiders. At this same time, the French were in a colonial race with Great Britain in Southeast Asia and were pushing hard for stronger relations with Indochina. This, just as in the reign of Minh Mạng, also brought up Christian missionaries, mostly Spanish and French, who ignored the ban. When Trị began to imprison the missionaries, it prompted an immediate response from France. In 1843, the French government sent a military expedition to Indochina with orders to protect and defend French interests, free the illegal missionaries, if possible without causing an international incident.

Trị's determination to eliminate all Roman Catholic missionaries from his country could not be reconciled with a peaceful relationship with France. In 1845, this almost prompted a clash between Vietnam and the American warship USS Constitution which attempted to force Trị to free the missionary Dominique Lefèbvre, who had repeatedly come to Vietnam illegally multiple times. The French task force reached Tourane, modern day Da Nang, on 23 March 1847, and demanded that the safety of French nationals be assured and for Thiệu Trị to cease the persecution of missionaries.

The imperial mandarins put off delivering the emperor's reply and fighting broke out. Thiệu Trị had fortified the coast, but the French forces easily defeated the Vietnamese due to the Nguyễn dynasty's inferior equipment. All of the Vietnamese coastal forts were destroyed and three Nguyễn junks were sunk before the French squadron sailed away. Thiệu Trị called all missionaries enemy spies and demanded that all Christians should be executed on the spot. The mandarins did not put this order into effect and Emperor Thiệu Trị died shortly afterwards; no missionaries were actually ever executed during his reign.

Tri was deeply disturbed by the Tourane battle, not only because of the loss of men and material but also from a sense of impending doom unless he could find a way to manage the threat posed by the French Navy. According to the True Records of the Great South (Dai Nam Thuc Luc), he reportedly said:

"The Westerners are cunning. If we abolish our laws against Christianity, the British will hear of it and demand that we abolish our laws against opium. The Westerners are wolves: there is no way to satisfy them! What can we do when everything must be according to their demands? Moreover, Christianity is a false religion and its harm to us has reached the level of foreign relations and has opened the door to war. Opium is an anesthetic, and it utterly ruins human lives. These two things are both strictly forbidden and we will publicly affirm this so that it will be known in the history written by future generations...The Westerners are not simply one country. For example, the Dutch we never see and when they send messages to us they are not from a king but from some strange authority that we cannot understand. But the French, although we have released them from prison many times, despite forbidding them to enter our country, and we thereby deserve their thanks, still they sprout more desperate schemes. Let us wait for the return of our traveling officials, and we can ask them about French intentions. If this enemy has some aggressive idea, Saigon and Hai Phong will also be places of danger, not only Da Nang.

== Family ==
| Rank | Title | Name | Year of birth-dead | Note |
|---|---|---|---|---|
| Consort Quý | Empress Nghi Thiên Chương The Empress Dowager Từ Dụ The Great Empress Dowager Từ Dụ The Great Grand Empress Dowager Từ Dụ | Phạm Thị Hằng | 1810–1902 | Hometown Gò Công Phạm Đăng Hưng's daughter From palace lady before the emperor coronation, she becomes the second rank consort Thành, now there are no one be the first rank consort so she was the highest rank of the harem. She was Emperor Tự Đức's mother. 3 years later, she becomes the first rank consort Quý, the highest rank of the harem, just under Imperial Noble Consort (the title for the official wife of the Emperor instead of The Empress) After he son became the emperor, he promoted her the title The Empress Dowager Từ Dụ. Emperor Hàm Nghi promoted her the title The Great Empress Dowager Từ Dụ. And Thành Thái Emperor promoted her the title The Great Grand Empress Dowager Từ Dụ |
| Consort Lệnh | The first rank consort Lệnh | Nguyễn Thị Nhậm | | Her hometown is An Giang Nguyễn Văn Nhơn's daughter From palace lady before the emperor coronation, she becomes the second rank consort Trinh, just under Consort Thành of Phạm Đăng family. 3 years later, she becomes the first rank consort Lệnh, now she under Consort Quý Phạm Đăng family and Consort Lương of Võ family. |
| Consort Lương | The first rank Consort Lương | Võ Thị Viên | 1815–1880 | Her hometown is Thừa Thiên province. Nguyễn Hữu Linh's daughter. From palace lady before the emperor coronation, she becomes the third rank concubine Lương, under consort Thành and Consort Trinh at the second rank, and the third rank concubine Quý who died before. After 3 years she became the first rank consort Lương just under the first rank consort Quý of Phạm Đăng family |
| Consort Thục | The second rank consort Thục | Nguyễn Thị Xuyên | | Her hometown is Quảng Bình province. Nguyễn Văn Phụng's daughter and Concubine Nhu's young sister. From palace lady before the emperor coronation, she becomes the third rank concubine Đức. After 3 years she became the second rank consort Thục, she was the only one who had the title of Second rank consort now. Her son, Hồng Y, emperor Dục Đức's father, and emperor Great grand father of Thành Thái emperor. |
| Concubine Quý | The third rank concubine Quý | Đinh Thị Hạnh | 1808–1885 | She died before her husband became the emperor. Her son is the first and the oldest prince of the emperor, who was feed by the great grand empress dowager Thuận Thiên, the emperor's grandmother, Gia Long's wife. Her son was expected to become the succeeding emperor but the emperor changed his mind at the end. |
| Concubine Thụy | The Third rank concubine Thụy The Great consort dowager The third rank concubine Đoan | Trương Thị Thận | 1817-18889 | She is Hiệp Hòa emperor's mother. From palace lady before the emperor's coronation, she becomes Huy (fourth rank concubine), then become Thụy (third rank concubine). Hiệp Hòa emperor promoted her the title The Imperial noble consort dowager, her position now just under Empress Dowager Từ Dụ, after her son was deposed, she was stripped the consort dowager title and resumed the position of concubine. |
| Concubine Đức | The Third rank concubine Đức | Nguyễn Thị Huyên | 1816–1892 | From palace lady before the emperor coronation, she becomes the fourth rank concubine Ý, then become The third rank concubine Đức |
| Concubine Kỷ | The Third rank concubine Kỷ | Trương Thị Vĩnh | | She was the palace maid with no title, but she born Prince Hồng Cai, so she is grandmother of Kiến Phúc emperor, Hàm Nghi emperor and Đồng Khánh emperor and Khải Định Emperor great-grandmother, Bảo Đại Emperor great-great-grandmother, so he promoted her the title of Kỷ (Third rank concubine). |
| Concubine Nhu | Nhu (The fourth rank concubine) | Nguyễn Thị Yên | | She was The second rank consort Thục's old sister |
| Concubine Nhàn | Nhàn (The fifth rank concubine) | Phan Thị Kháng | | |
| Concubine Thuận | The fifth rank concubine Thuận | Hoàng Thị Dĩnh | | |
| Lady | The sixth rank lady | Nguyễn Đình Thị Loan | | |
| Lady | The sixth rank lady | Hồ Thị Nghi | | |
| Lady | The seventh rank lady | Ngô Thị Xuân | | |
| Lady | The ninth rank lady | Trương Thị Thúy | 1810–1894 | |
| Lady | The ninth rank lady | Nguyễn Thị Kinh | | |
| Lady | The ninth rank lady | Mai Thị Tiêm | 1814–1877 | |
| Lady | The ninth rank lady | Võ Thị Duyên | | |
| Lady | The ninth rank lady | Phan Thị Diệu | | |
| Lady | The ninth rank lady | Nguyễn Thị Phương | | |
| Lady | The ninth rank lady | Nguyễn Thị Vị | | |
| Lady | The ninth rank lady | Trần Thị Sâm | | |
| Lady | The ninth rank lady | Phan Thị Thục | | |
| Lady | The ninth rank lady | Đỗ Thị Trinh | | |
| Lady | The ninth rank lady | Trương Thị Lương | | |
| Lady | The ninth rank lady | Nguyễn Thị Khuê | | |
| Lady | The ninth rank lady | Phan Thị Quý | | |
| Maid Palace | | Nguyễn Viết Thị Lệ | ?-1872 | |
| Maid Palace | | Nguyễn Hòa Thị Hân | | |
| Maid Palace | | Bùi Thị Bút | | |
| Maid Palace | | Nguyễn Thị Huệ | | |
| Maid Palace | | Hồ Thị Ý Nhi | | |
| Maid Palace | | Nguyễn Thị Hương Nhị | | |
| Maid Palace | | Nguyễn Đức Thị Ân | | |

Thiệu Trị Nguyễn dynasty Died: 1847
| Preceded by Minh Mạng | Emperor of Đại Nam; 1841–1847 | Succeeded by Tự Đức |
