= Tôn Thất Thuyết =

Vietnamese revolutionary (1839–1913)

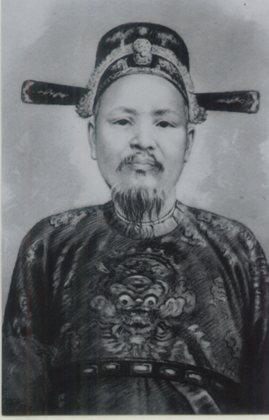
Tôn Thất Thuyết

Tôn Thất Thuyết (尊室説; 12 May 1839 in Huế – 22 Sep 1913 in Longzhou), Courtesy name Đàm Phu (談夫), was the regent and leading mandarin of Emperor Tự Đức of Vietnam's Nguyễn dynasty. Thuyết later led the Cần Vương movement which aimed to restore Vietnamese independence under Emperor Hàm Nghi. He fled to China seeking political refuge after Hàm Nghi's capture by France, and later died in Longzhou, Guangxi.
