= Henri Mouhot =

French naturalist and explorer (1826–1861)

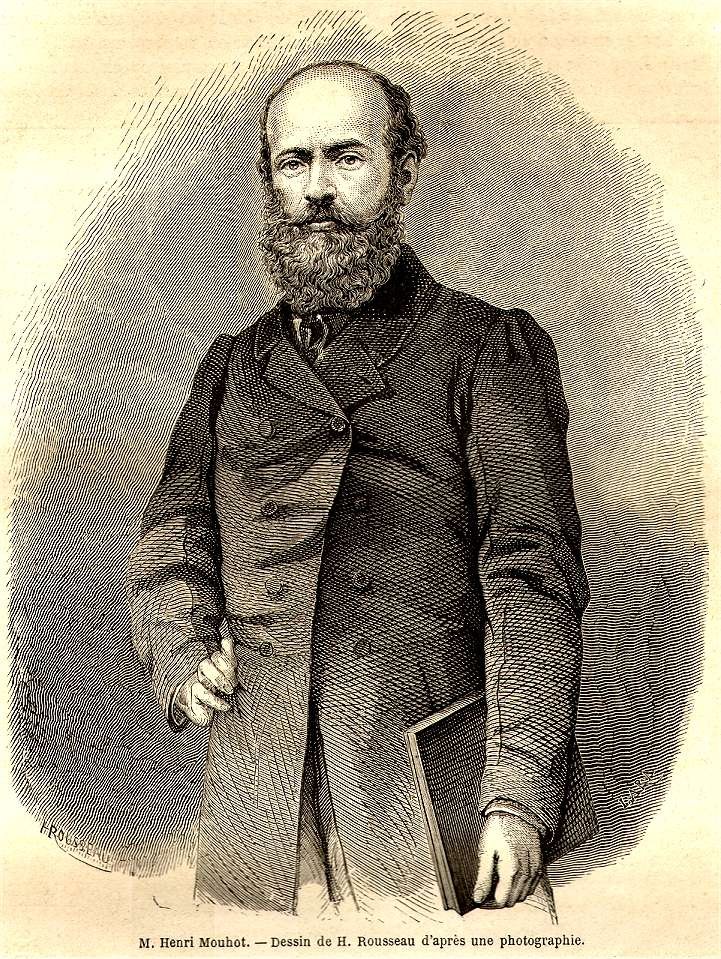
- A drawing of Mouhot by Henri Rousseau from a photograph
- Born: 15 May 1826; Montbéliard, Doubs, France
- Died: 10 November 1861 (aged 35); Naphan, Laos
- Known for: Angkor
- Scientific career
- Fields: Natural history

Alexandre Henri Mouhot (French pronunciation: [alɛksɑ̃dʁ ɑ̃ʁi mu.o]; 15 May 1826 – 10 November 1861) was a French naturalist and explorer of the mid-19th century. He was born in Montbéliard, Doubs, France, near the Swiss border. He died near Luang-Prabang, Laos. He is remembered mostly in connection to Angkor. Mouhot's tomb is located just outside of Ban Phanom, to the east of Luang Prabang.

== Early life ==
Mouhot traveled throughout Europe with his brother Charles, studying photographic techniques developed by Louis Daguerre. In 1856, he began devoting himself to the study of natural science. Upon reading The Kingdom and People of Siam by Sir John Bowring in 1857, Mouhot decided to travel to Indochina to conduct a series of botanical expeditions for the collection of new zoological specimens. His initial requests for grants and passage were rejected by French companies and the government of Napoleon III. The Royal Geographical Society and the Zoological Society of London lent him their support, and he set sail for Bangkok, via Singapore.

== Expeditions ==
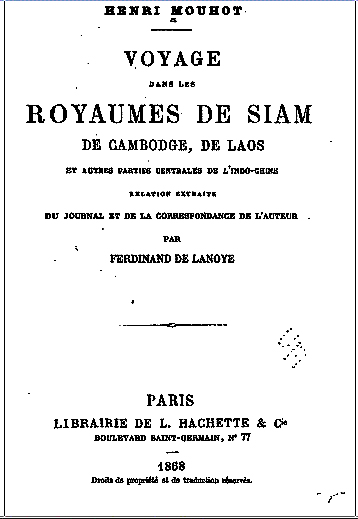

From his base in Bangkok in 1858, Mouhot made four journeys into the interior of Siam, Cambodia and Laos. Over a period of three years before he died, he endured extreme hardships and fended off wild animals, to explore some previously uncharted jungle territory.

On his first expedition, he visited Ayutthaya, the former capital of Siam (already charted territory), and gathered an extensive collection of insects, as well as terrestrial and river shells, and sent them on to England.

In January 1860, at the end of his second and longest journey, he reached Angkor (already charted territory) — an area spread over more than 400 km^{2}., consisting of many sites of ancient terraces, pools, moated cities, palaces and temples, the most famous of which is Angkor Wat. He recorded this visit in his travel journals, which included three weeks of detailed observations. These journals and illustrations were later incorporated into Voyage dans les royaumes de Siam, de Cambodge, de Laos which were published posthumously.

=== Angkor ===
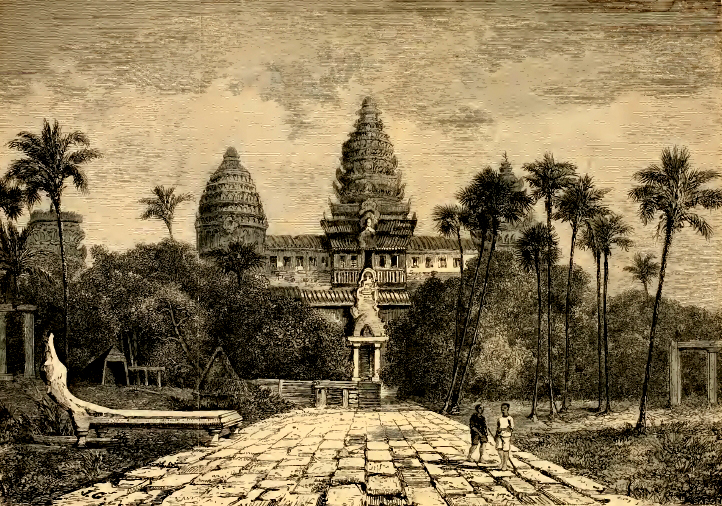
Facade of Angkor Wat, by Mouhot

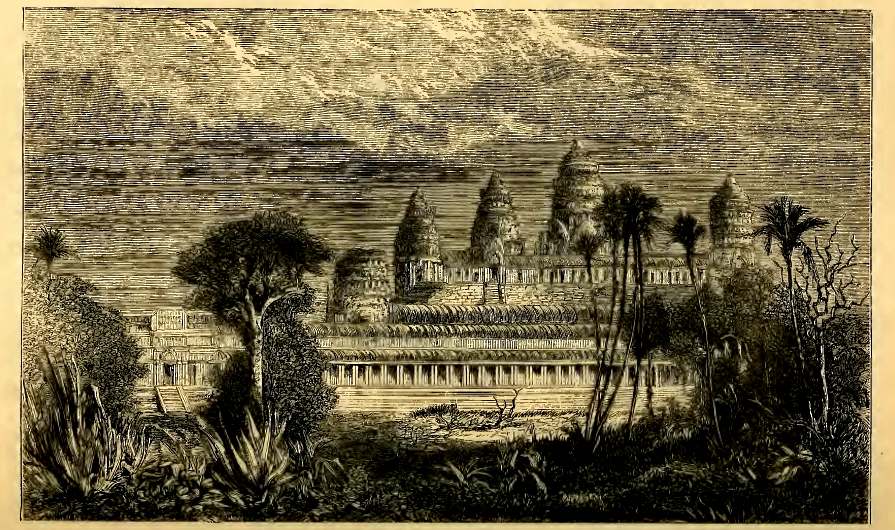
Mouhot drawing: Angkor Wat

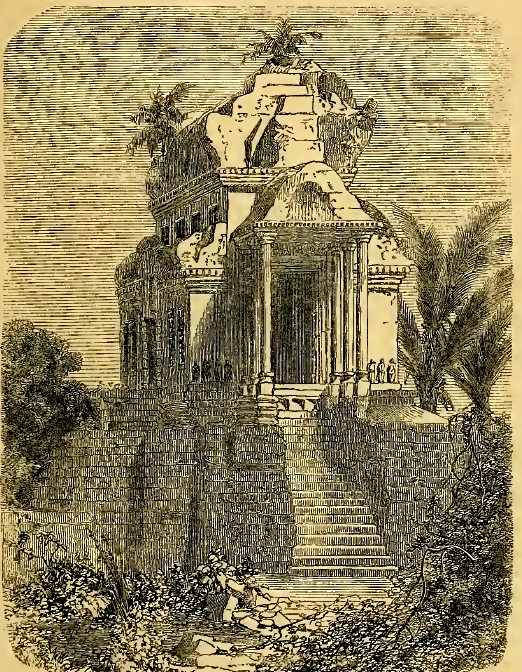
Pavilion of Angkor Wat, by Mouhot

Mouhot is often mistakenly credited with "discovering" Angkor, although Angkor was never lost — the location and existence of the entire series of Angkor sites was always known to the Khmers and had been visited by several westerners since the 16th century. Mouhot mentions in his journals that his contemporary Father Charles Emile Bouillevaux, a French missionary based in Battambang, had reported that he and other Western explorers and missionaries had visited Angkor Wat and the other Khmer temples at least five years before Mouhot. Father Bouillevaux published his accounts in 1857: "Travel in Indochina 1848–1846, The Annam and Cambodia". Previously, a Portuguese trader Diogo do Couto visited Angkor and wrote his accounts about it in 1550, and the Portuguese monk Antonio da Magdalena had also written about his visit to Angkor Wat in 1586. Mouhot did, however, popularise Angkor in the West.

Perhaps none of the previous European visitors wrote as evocatively as Mouhot, who included interesting and detailed sketches. In his posthumously published Travels in Siam, Cambodia and Laos, Mouhot compared Angkor to the pyramids, for it was popular in the West at that time to ascribe the origin of all civilization to the Middle East. For example, he described the Buddha heads at the gateways to Angkor Thom as "four immense heads in the Egyptian style" and wrote of Angkor:

"One of these temples—a rival to that of Solomon, and erected by some ancient Michael Angelo—might take an honourable place beside our most beautiful buildings. It is grander than anything left to us by Greece or Rome, and presents a sad contrast to the state of barbarism in which the nation is now plunged."

Mouhot also wrote that:

"At Ongcor, there are ...ruins of such grandeur... that, at the first view, one is filled with profound admiration, and cannot but ask what has become of this powerful race, so civilized, so enlightened, the authors of these gigantic works?"

Such quotations may have given rise to the popular misconception that Mouhot had found the abandoned ruins of a lost civilisation. The Royal Geographical Society and The Zoological Society, both interested in announcing new finds, seemed to have encouraged the rumor that Mouhot — whom they had sponsored to chart mountains and rivers and catalog new species — had discovered Angkor. Mouhot himself erroneously asserted that Angkor was the work of an earlier civilization than the Khmer. For although the very same civilization which built Angkor was alive and right before his eyes, he considered them in a "state of barbarism" and could not believe they were civilized or enlightened enough to have built it. He assumed that the authors of such grandeur were a disappeared race and mistakenly dated Angkor back over two millennia, to around the same era as Rome. The true history of Angkor Wat was later pieced together from the book The Customs of Cambodia written by Temür Khan's envoy Zhou Daguan to Cambodia in 1295–1296 and from stylistic and epigraphic evidence accumulated during the subsequent clearing and restoration work carried out across the whole Angkor site. It is now known that the dates of Angkor's habitation were from the early ninth century to the early 15th century.

=== Itinerary in Southeast Asia ===
Henri Mouhot's exploration covered 4,955 kilometers in Southeast Asia, in three years, six months and 13 days. The exact itinerary, as listed in Le Tour du Monde ("Around the World" journal), is as follows:

Stage	Locality (period name)	Locality (current name)	Chapter from Le Tour du Monde	Arrival	Departure
Preparation
1	London	London	I	27 April 1858	
2	Singapore	Singapore	I	3 September 1858	
3	Paknam	Pak Nam	I	12 September 1858	
4	Bangkok	Bangkok	II - V		19 October 1858
First expedition (256 km)
5	Ajuthia	Ayutthaya	VI	23 October 1858	
6	Arajiek, Phrabat	Phra Phuttabat	VII	13 November 1858	14 November 1858
7	Patawi	Phra Phutthachai	VIII	28 November 1858	
8	Bangkok	Bangkok	VIII	5 December 1858	23 December 1858
Second expedition (2,399 km)
9	Chantaboun Gulf, Lion's Rock	Laem Sing	IX	3 January 1859	
10	Chantaboun	Chanthaburi	IX	4 January 1859	
11	Ile de Ko-Man	Ko Man Nork	IX	26 January 1859	
12	Ile des Patates et ile de Ko-Kram	Ko Khram	IX	28 January 1859	
13	Ile de l'Arec	Chanthaburi	X	29 January 1859	
14	Ven-Ven	Pak Nam Welu	X	1 March 1859	
15	Chute de Kombau, grotte du Mont Sabab	Namtok Phlio National Park	X		
16	Chantaboun	Chanthaburi	XI		
17	Ko-Khut	Ko Kood	XI		
18	Koh-Khong	Koh Kong	XI		
19	Kampot	Kampot	XI		
20	Kompong-Baïe	Kompong Bay	XI		
21	Udong	Oudongk	XII		
22	Pinhalu	Ponhea Leu	XIII	2 July 1859	
23	Penom Penh	Phnom Penh	XIV		
24	Ile de Ko Sutin	Kaoh Soutin	XV		
25	Pemptiélan	Peam Chilӗang	XV		
26	Brelum	Bro Lam Peh	XV	16 August 1859	29 November 1859
27	Pemptiélan	Peam Chilӗang	XVI		
28	Pinhalu	Ponhea Leu	XVI	21 December 1859	
29	Penom Penh	Phnom Penh	XVI		
30	Lac du Touli-Sap	Lac du Tonlé Sap	XVI		
31	Battambang	Battambang	XVII		20 January 1860
32	Ongkor	Angkor	XVIII	22 January 1860	12 February 1860
33	Mont Ba-Khêng	Phnom Bakheng	XIX		
34	Battambang	Battambang	XXI		5 March 1860
35	Ongkor-Borège	Mongkol Borey	XXI	8 March 1860	9 March 1860
36	Muang Kabine	Kabinburi	XXI	28 March 1860	
37	Bangkok	Bangkok	XXI	4 April 1860	8 May 1860
Third expedition (1,250 km)
38	Petchabury	Petchaburi	XXII	11 May 1860	
39	Bangkok	Bangkok	XXIII	1 September 1860	
40	Nophabury	Lopburi	XXIV		
41	Ajuthia	Ayutthaya	XXIV		19 October 1860
42	Tharua-Tristard	Tha Ruea	XXIV	20 October 1860	
43	Saohaïe	Sao Hai	XXIV	22 October 1860	
44	Khao Koc	Wat Tha Khlo Tai	XXV		
45	Tchaïapoune	Chaiyaphum	XXVI	28 February 1861	
46	Saraburi	Saraburi	XXVI		
47	Bangkok	Bangkok	XXVI		12 April 1861
Fourth expédition (1,050 km)
48	Sikiéou	Si Khiu	XXVI		
49	Korat	Nakhon Ratchasima	XXVI		
50	Penom-Wat	Prasat Phanom Wan	XXVI		
51	Tchaïapoune	Chaiyaphum	XXVII		
52	Nam-Jasiea	Non Kok	XXVII		
53	Poukiéau	Phu Khiao	XXVII		
54	Leuye	Loei	XXVII	16 May 1861	
55	Paklaïe	Pak Lay	XXVII	24 June 1861	
56	Thodua	Tha Deua	XXVII		
57	Luang Prabang	Luang Prabang	XXVII	25 July 1861	
58	Na-Lê	Na Le	XXVIII	3 September 1861	15 October 1861

Link to the itinerary on Google Maps

== Colonialism ==
Some have argued that Mouhot may have been a tool for French expansionism and the annexation of territories which followed shortly after his death. Mouhot himself, however, did not seem to be a hardcore colonialist, for he occasionally doubted the beneficial effects of European colonisation:

"Will the present movement of the nations of Europe towards the East result in good by introducing into these lands the blessings of our civilization? Or shall we, as blind instruments of boundless ambition, come hither as a scourge, to add to their present miseries?"

However, Mouhot appears in his notes as genuinely interested in South East Asia and its culture, and kept in mind the benefits he thought France could provide to those countries. He notably wrote in the Tour du Monde:

Page 174: " European domination, the abolition of slavery, protective and wise laws, and faithful, experienced and scrupulously honest administrators, would alone be capable of regenerating this State, so close to Cochinchina, where France is seeking to establish itself and where it will undoubtedly establish itself; then it would certainly become a granary of abundance, as fertile as lower Cochinchina ".

Page 175: "People are astonished to see insignificant production and no industry in these regions that are so fertile and so rich, but they are generally unaware that the kings and mandarins enrich themselves through despoilment and corruption, through all the abuses that ruin work and halt progress. Let this country be administered with wisdom and prudence, with loyalty and protection for the people, and everything will change with marvellous rapidity.”

Mouhot also highlighted he saw France already provided Cambodia, at his time: (page 179) "Had it not been for the war that France has been waging against the Empire of Annam for the past two years, it is probable that today the last hour would have sounded for the little kingdom of Cambodia, whose destiny, with little doubt, is to die out and be assimilated into the neighbouring peoples.”

== Death and legacy ==
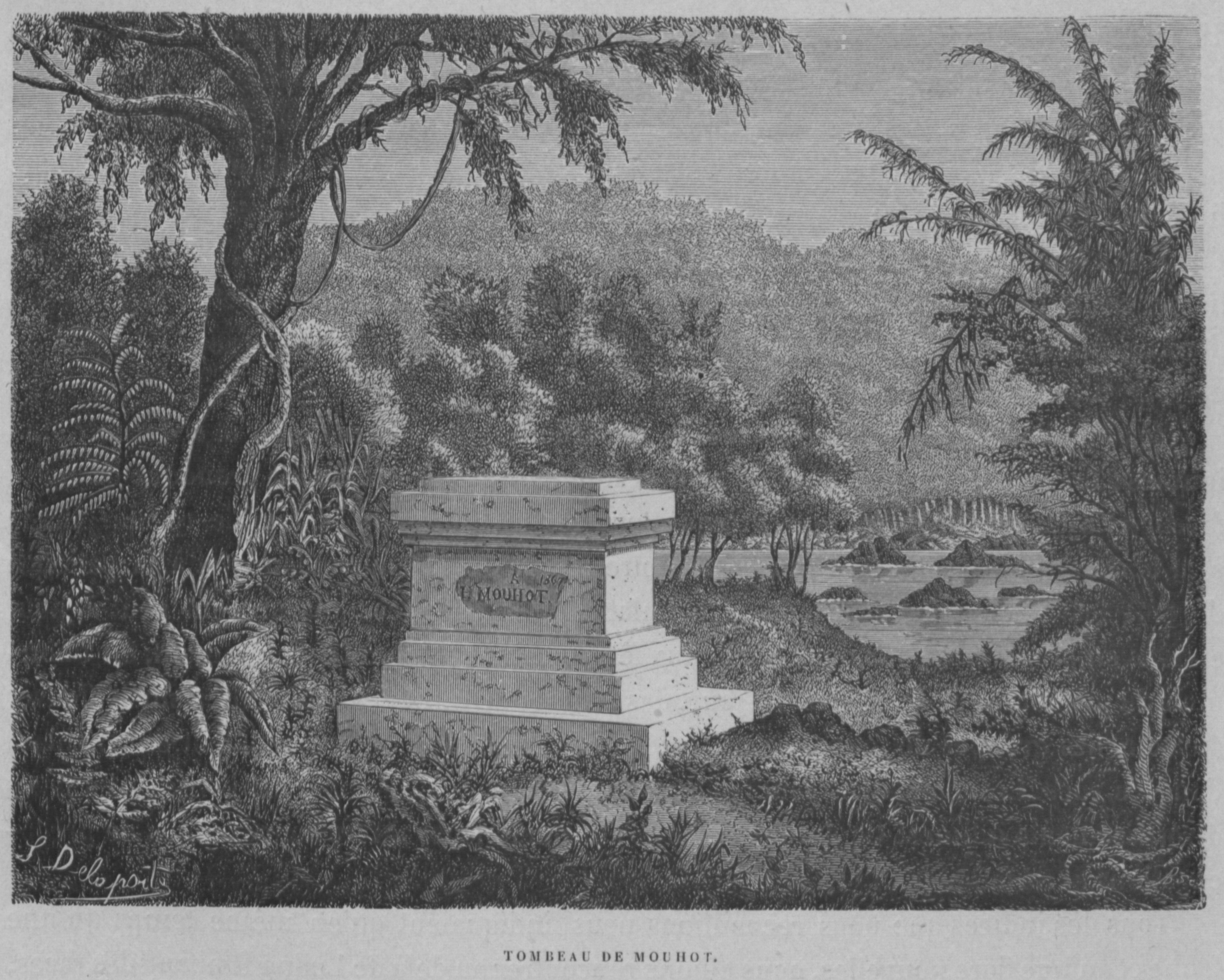
Mouhot's grave in 1867; from Francis Garnier's book of the Mekong Expedition of 1866–68

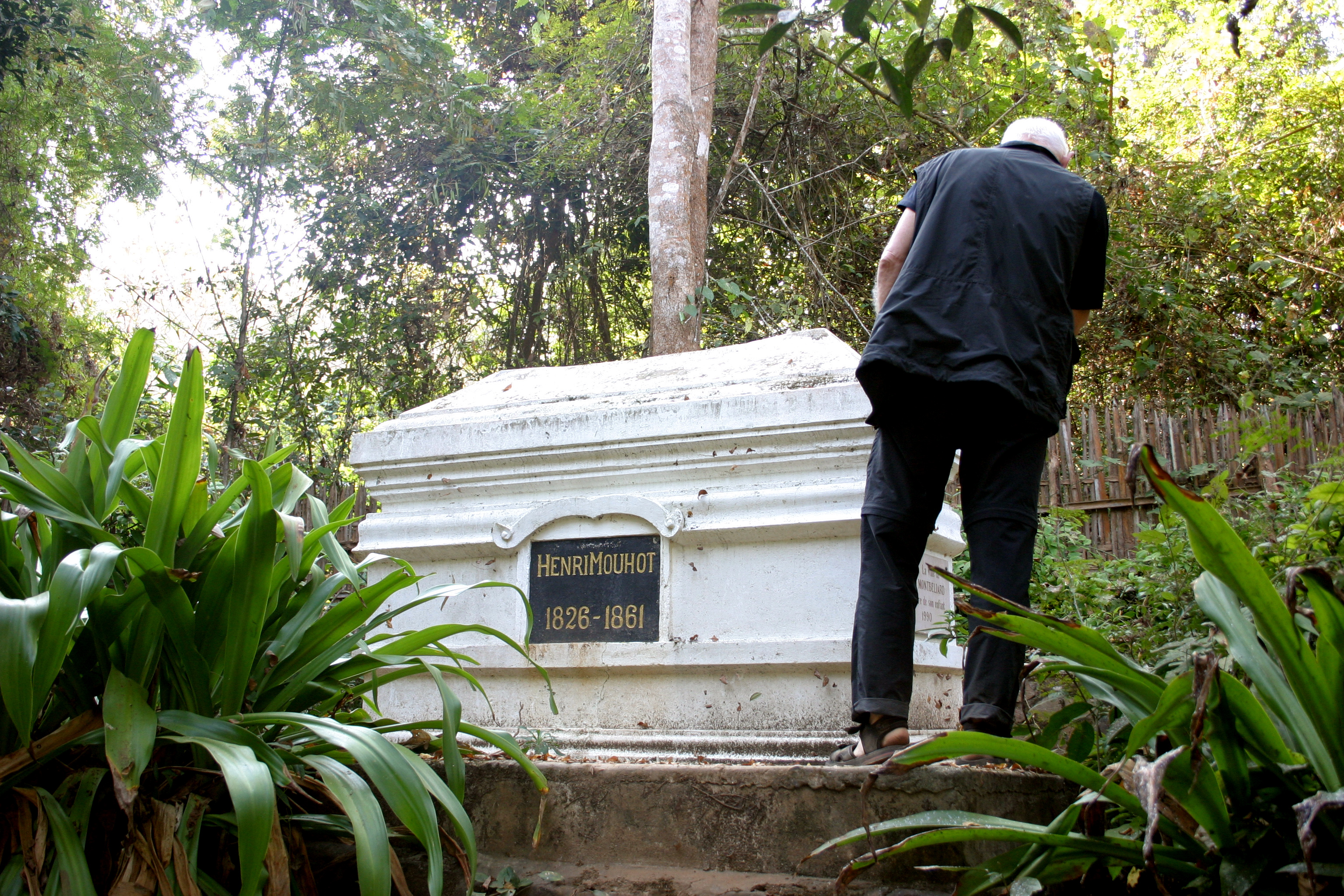
Mouhot's grave in 2007

Mouhot died of a malarial fever on his fourth expedition, in the jungles of Laos. He had been visiting Luang Prabang, capital of the Lan Xang kingdom, one of three kingdoms which eventually merged into what can be known as modern-day Laos, and was under the patronage of the king. Two of his servants buried him near a French mission in Naphan, by the banks of the Nam Khan river. Mouhot's favourite servant, Phrai, transported all of Mouhot's journals and specimens back to Bangkok, from where they were shipped to Europe.

In 1867 the French commander Ernest Doudart de Lagrée of the Mekong expedition of 1866–1868, following an order from the Governor of Cochinchina, built a small monument near where they believed Mouhot's grave would have been. De Lagrée gave this eulogy:

"We found everywhere the memory of our compatriot who, by the uprightness of his character and his natural benevolence, had acquired the regard and the affection of the natives."

Sixteen years later when the French explorer Dr Paul Neis travelled up the Nam Khan river he found only "a few bricks scattered on the ground". In 1887, Auguste Pavie arranged for a more durable crypt monument to be built, and a sala was built nearby to house and feed visitors to the white shrine. Some restoration work was done on the tomb in 1951 by the EFEO (Ecole Française d'Extrême Orient—The French School of the Far East).

During the years of the Second Indochina War Mouhot's tomb was consumed by the jungle and lost until it was rediscovered in 1989 by French scholar, Jean-Michel Strobino, together with Mongkhol Sasorith, a Lao historian. Strobino organised restoration of the monument with the support of the French embassy and the Municipality of Montbeliard, Mouhot's birth town. A new plaque was fixed to one end of the crypt in 1990 to commemorate this rediscovery. The location is now known to hotels and tourist operators in Luang Prabang, and a minivan or "tuk tuk" may be hired to take one the 10 km from town to visit it. This entails a walk down a steep track to the left of a sharp bend on the road to Luang Prabang Railway Station. Passing several small restaurants that now operate along the river at this point and then up a well-cleared track to the tomb, altogether about 250 meters (2025).

The popularity of Angkor generated by Mouhot's writings led to the popular support for a major French role in its study and preservation. The French carried out the majority of research work on Angkor until recently.

Two species of Asian reptiles are named in his honor: Cuora mouhotii, a turtle; and Oligodon mouhoti, a snake.

== Works ==
Mouhot's travel journals are immortalized in Voyage dans les royaumes de Siam, de Cambodge, de Laos et autres parties centrales de l'Indochine (published 1863, 1864). English title: Travels in the Central Parts of Indo-China, Cambodia and Laos During the Years 1858,1859, and 1860.

- Travels in Siam, Cambodia, Laos, and Annam. Henri Mouhot ISBN 974-8434-03-6
- Travels in Siam, Cambodia and Laos, 1858-1860 Henri Mouhot, Michael Smithies - ISBN 0-19-588614-3
- Travels in the Central Parts of Indo-China (Siam), Cambodia, and Laos During the Years 1858, 1859, and 1860. Mouhot, Henri—ISBN 974-8495-11-6 (B/W illustrations)
