= Mekong expedition of 1866–1868 =

French exploration of the Mekong River

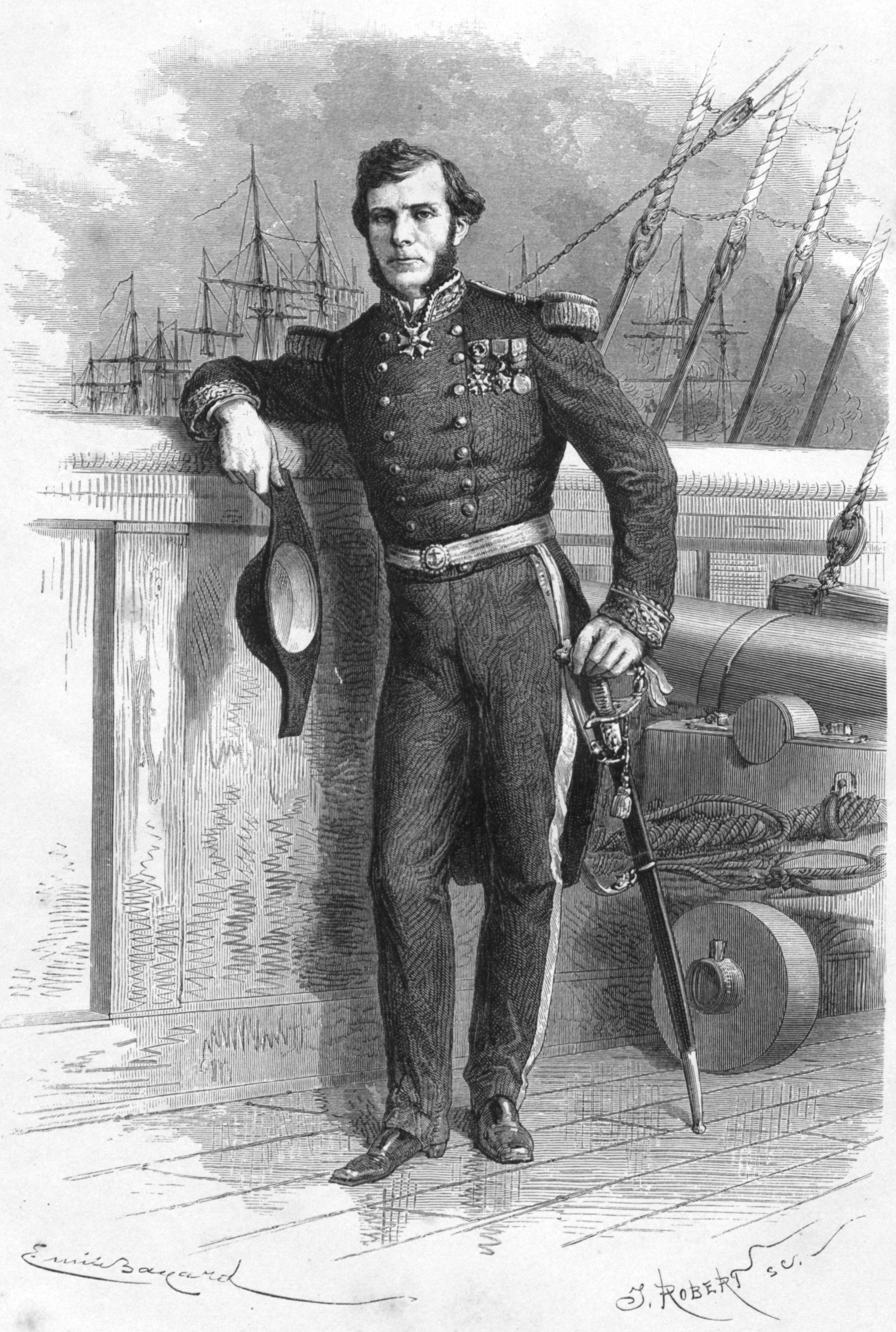
Ernest Doudard de Lagrée the expedition leader

The Mekong expedition of 1866–1868, conceived and promoted by a group of French colonial officers and launched under the leadership of captain Ernest Doudard de Lagrée, was a naval exploration and scientific expedition of the Mekong River on behalf of the French colonial authorities of Cochinchina. Its primary objective, besides scientific documentation, mapping, and the mission civilisatrice, was an assessment of the river's navigability in order to link the delta region and the port of Saigon with the riches of southern China and upper Siam (modern day Thailand). Ambitions were to turn Saigon into a successful commercial center in the model of Shanghai, which was partially controlled by several Western powers. The expedition's objectives were heavily influenced by broader French geopolitical thought, namely the consolidation and expansion of the French colonial empire, the containment of British Burma and the countering of British economic influence in the Southeast Asia.

Over the course of two years the expedition, which came to be known as the Mekong Exploration Commission, traversed almost 9,000 km (5,600 mi) from Saigon through 19th century Vietnam, Cambodia, Laos, Thailand, and Myanmar into China's Yunnan Province, finally arriving in Shanghai and mapping over 5,800 km (3,600 mi) of previously unknown terrain. Despite its explicit political and economic connotations, long after the classic Age of Discovery and the disappointment over the river's unsuitability as a trade highway, the expedition gained highest acclaim among scholars, in particular the Royal Geographical Society in London and "holds a special place in the European annals of discovery" as the first to reveal the Mekong valley region, its people, and southern China to Europeans.

== Background ==
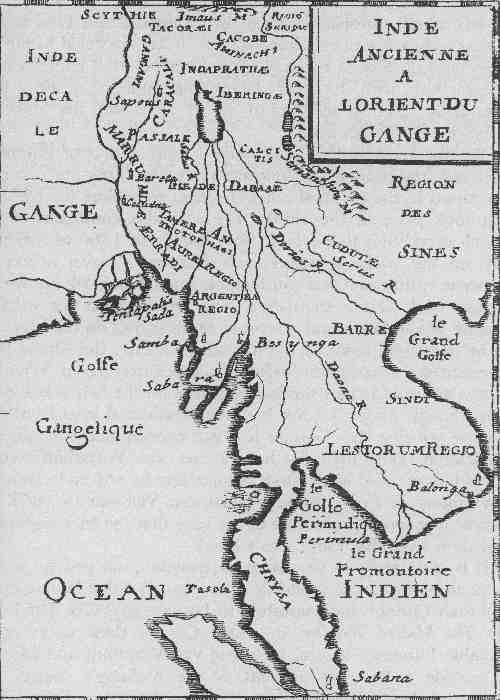
A French map of 1715, incorrectly showing the Chao Phraya River as a branch of the Mekong

Having relieved the Siege of Saigon, Admiral Léonard Charner proclaimed the formal annexation of three provinces of Cochinchina into the French Empire on 31 July 1861. The event marks the beginning of the colonial era of France in Southeast Asia, followed by the founding of French Cochinchina in 1862 and the French protectorate over Cambodia in 1863. The government in Paris maintained a more realistic idea on these acquisitions than most of its colonial entrepreneurs as it became clear that Cochinchina was "...not to be a jewel in the French colonial empire." It had rather become a liability and the Ministry of the Colonies pondered options of retreat, strictly based on scholars' reports in French Indochina who measured Saigon's commercial success against the British dominated territories of Singapore and Shanghai. Contrary to these sober official conclusions, the lucrative trade of these two ports and the economic links to China via the Yangtze motivated the French colonial community in Saigon to speed up surveying the Mekong.

Since 1857 a number of colonial officers seriously voted for a mission "into the unknown lands north of the Mekong delta", arguing that their "government underestimated the importance of such an expedition for the continuance of French colonial power." The eventual conquest and colonisation of northern Vietnam and the establishment of a solely French-controlled trade route to China were considered necessary objectives as the vast Chinese empire with its enormous market was to become a potential source of a great commercial opportunity. Francis Garnier, the most ardent supporter of the expedition wrote "For a long time the gaze of the colony had been cast with curiosity and impatience towards the interior of Indo-China which was shrouded in great mystery." Louis de Carné, the youngest expedition member also pointed to the unknowns: "Uncertainty begins within two degrees of Saigon, the very inexact charts of the great river; beyond that, only misleading geography instead of serving it."

An earlier British expedition, began in Burma in 1837 by Captain William C. Macleod, had travelled up the Salween River along the border to Thailand. The expedition was considered by the French as proof of British ambitions in the region. Only the refusal of Chinese authorities to allow him passage through Chinese-controlled territories ended McLeod's mission. Although unsuccessful, the event spurred fears that the British were about to win the race and close off Chinese trade to the French.

Some historians, such as the Dutch historian H. T. Bussemaker, have argued that French colonial undertakings and acquisitions in the region were mere reactions to British imperial and economic hegemony. Bussemaker wrote that "For the British, it was obvious that the French were trying to undercut British expansionism in India and China by interposing themselves in Indochina. The reason for this frantic expansionism was the hope that the Mekong river would prove to be navigable to the Chinese frontier, which then would open the immense Chinese market for French industrial goods."

== The Mekong Exploration Commission ==
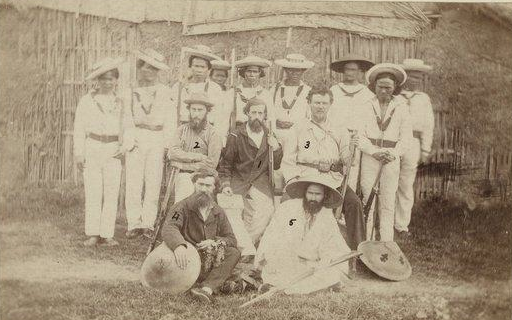
Participants of the Mekong Exploration Commission

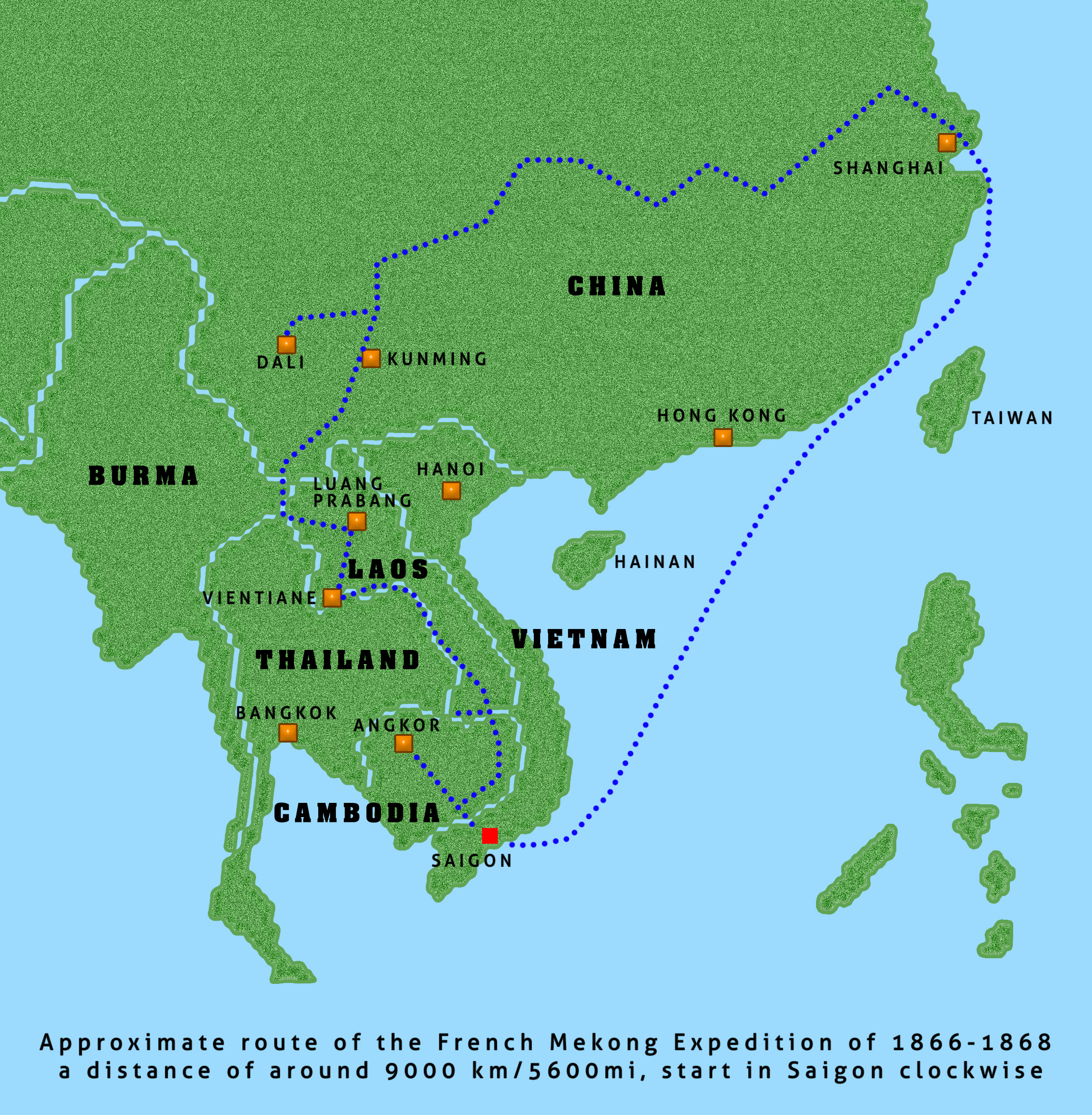
Route of the expedition

In 1865, the colonial governor of Saigon, Admiral Pierre-Paul de la Grandiere, won approval for the expedition from a reluctant Ministry of the Navy and the Colonies in Paris. "Throughout 1864, the French government had vacillated over whether to sustain their colonial possession in southern Vietnam or to abandon" this so far costly venture. On his return to Saigon, the governor appointed the members of the Mekong Exploration Commission (or The Exploration Commission, fr.: Commission d'exploration du Mékong) on 1 June 1866.

- Ernest Doudart de Lagrée (captain, expedition leader, member of the Agricultural and Industrial Committee Cochin, entomologist)
- Francis Garnier (lieutenant, inspector of Indigenous Affairs, mission leader after Doudart de Lagrée's death)
- Louis Delaporte (lieutenant, archaeologist, artist, art historian)
- Louis de Carné (governor de Carné's nephew, aged 23, attached to the Ministry of Foreign Affairs)
- Eugene Joubert (geologist, medical assistant 2nd class)
- Clovis Thorel (botanist, auxiliary 3rd class doctor, member of the Agricultural and Industrial Committee of Cochin)
- Émile Gsell (photographer)

The staff of the expedition, around 20 people, consisted of:

- marine infantry Sergeant Charbonnier (secretary of the Head of Shipping)
- a marine infantryman
- two French sailors
- two interpreters for Siamese and Annamite languages
- Alexis Om, interpreter for Cambodian languages
- two Tagalog sailors
- an Annamese sergeant and his militiamen

== Mission ==
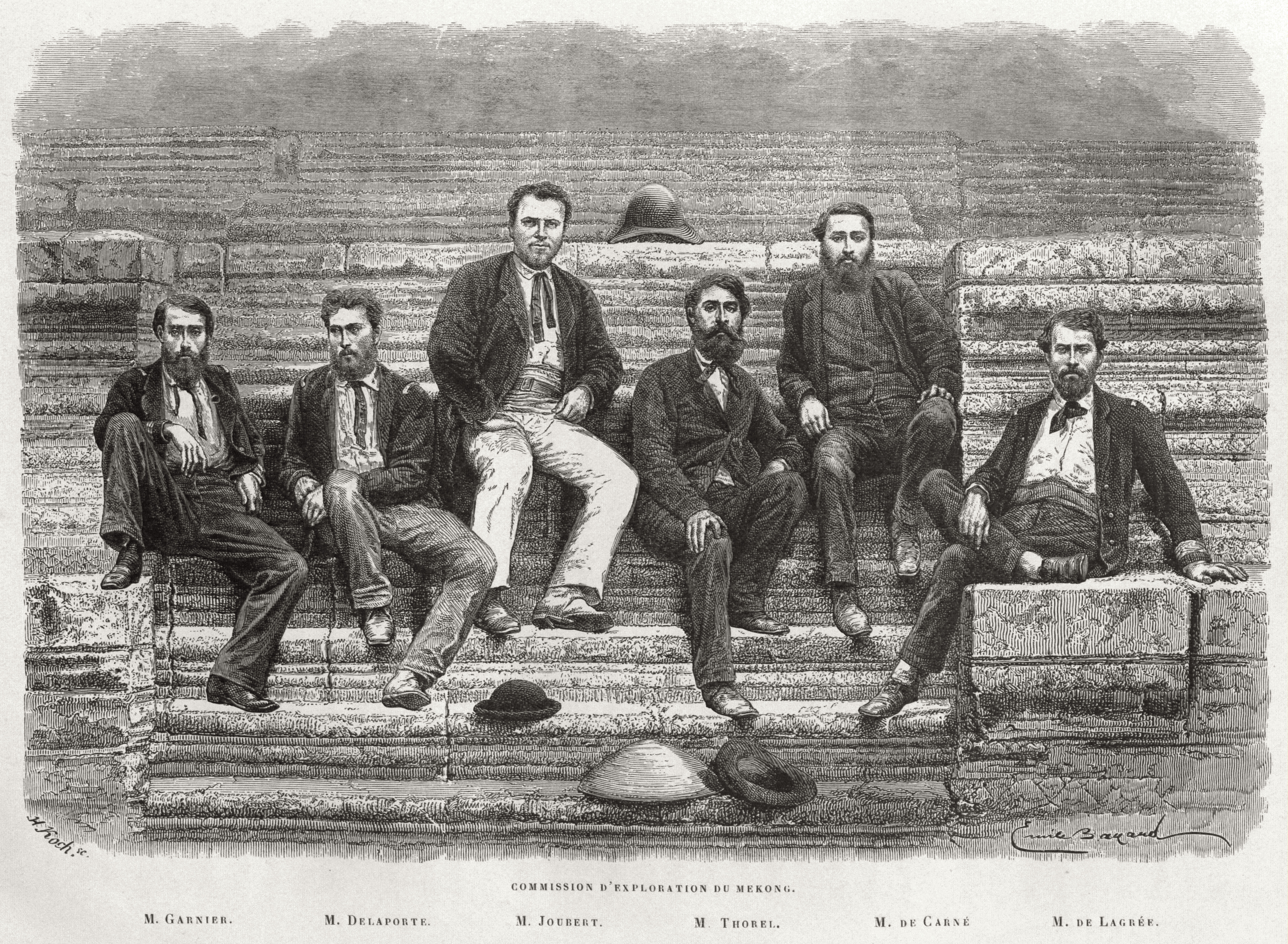
The leading members of the Mekong Exploration Commission at Angkor from left to right: Lieutenant Francis Garnier, Lieutenant Louis Delaporte, Clovis Thorel, Captain Ernest Doudart de Lagrée, Lucien Joubert and Louis de Carné - engraving from photo by Émile Gsell

Author John Keay provides a vivid image of the departing party in "The Mekong Exploration Commission, 1866–68: Anglo-French rivalry in South East Asia": "In two minuscule steam-driven gunboats, with an inordinate quantity of liquor, flour, guns and trade goods, plus all the trappings of a major scientific expedition, the Commission cast off from the Saigon waterfront and headed upriver into the great green unknown on June 5, 1866."

=== In Cambodia ===
Detouring into the Tonle Sap, the first stop was to be the ancient ruins of Angkor, which Henri Mouhot first had described in his pamphlet in 1861. The temple ruins, "a highlight for the expedition's members, served as an important point of remembrance for the expedition as the discovery had created a popular mania around the prospect of a newly-discovered ancient civilization in the Far East."

Disappointment soon set in after the expedition left the temple ruins, as only a few days later the men reached the Sambor rapids upstream of Kratie, the Prépatang and the Khone Falls in southern Laos, where at the Si Phan Don Islands the river splits into numerous channels with formidable rapids, waterfalls, currents and cataracts.

=== In Laos ===
At the Khone Falls, the men realized that the river was not at all navigable for any merchandise transport vessel and the steamboats had to be left behind. Still, the mission spent a week studying the falls, hoping to find a point where an average-sized river boat might be able to pass the cataracts or otherwise, whether the establishment of a lateral channel would be feasible. In spite of the "determination to put the stream to work, the Mekong was not yet a river to be tamed".

Garnier found himself on a river that "would simply not cooperate." He concluded that, "The future of rapid commercial relations on this vast river, the natural route from China to Saigon, of which I had happily dreamt the previous evening, appeared seriously compromised to me from this moment on."

On top of that, Captain Doudart de Lagrée had learned at the Cambodian court, that further upstream was another succession of rapids, between Pak Moun and Kemarat, around a hundred kilometers long, known as the Tang-Ho rapids or the Falls of Kemarat, where the river constitutes the border between modern day Ubon Ratchathani Province of Thailand and Savannakhet Province, Laos.

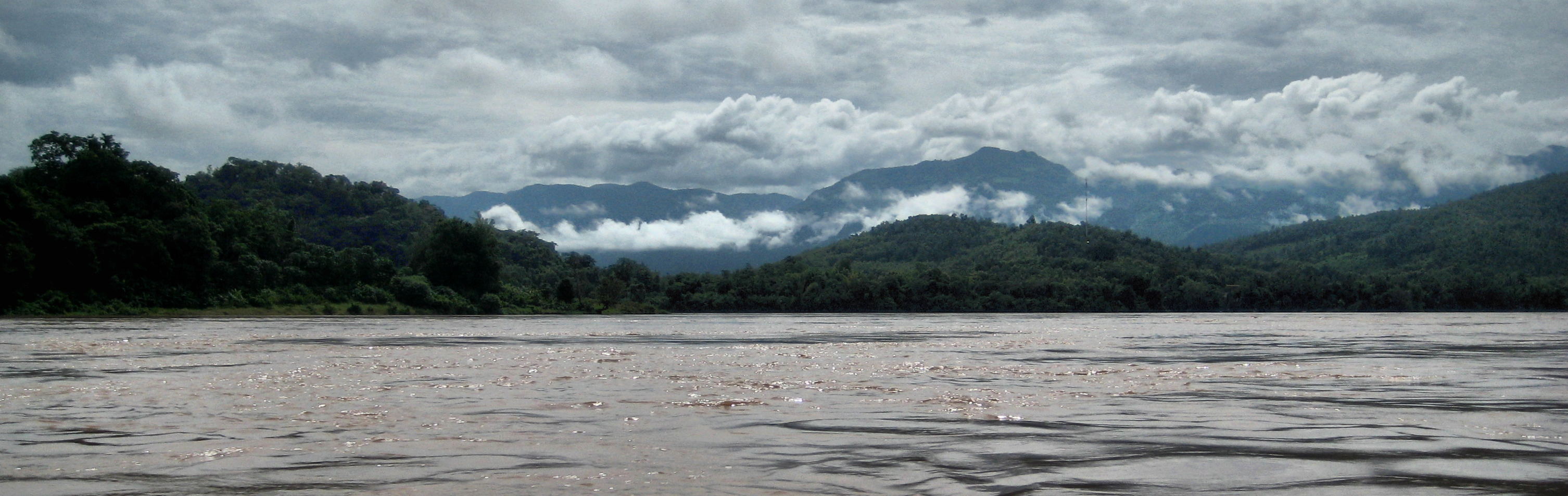
Mekong River in Laos

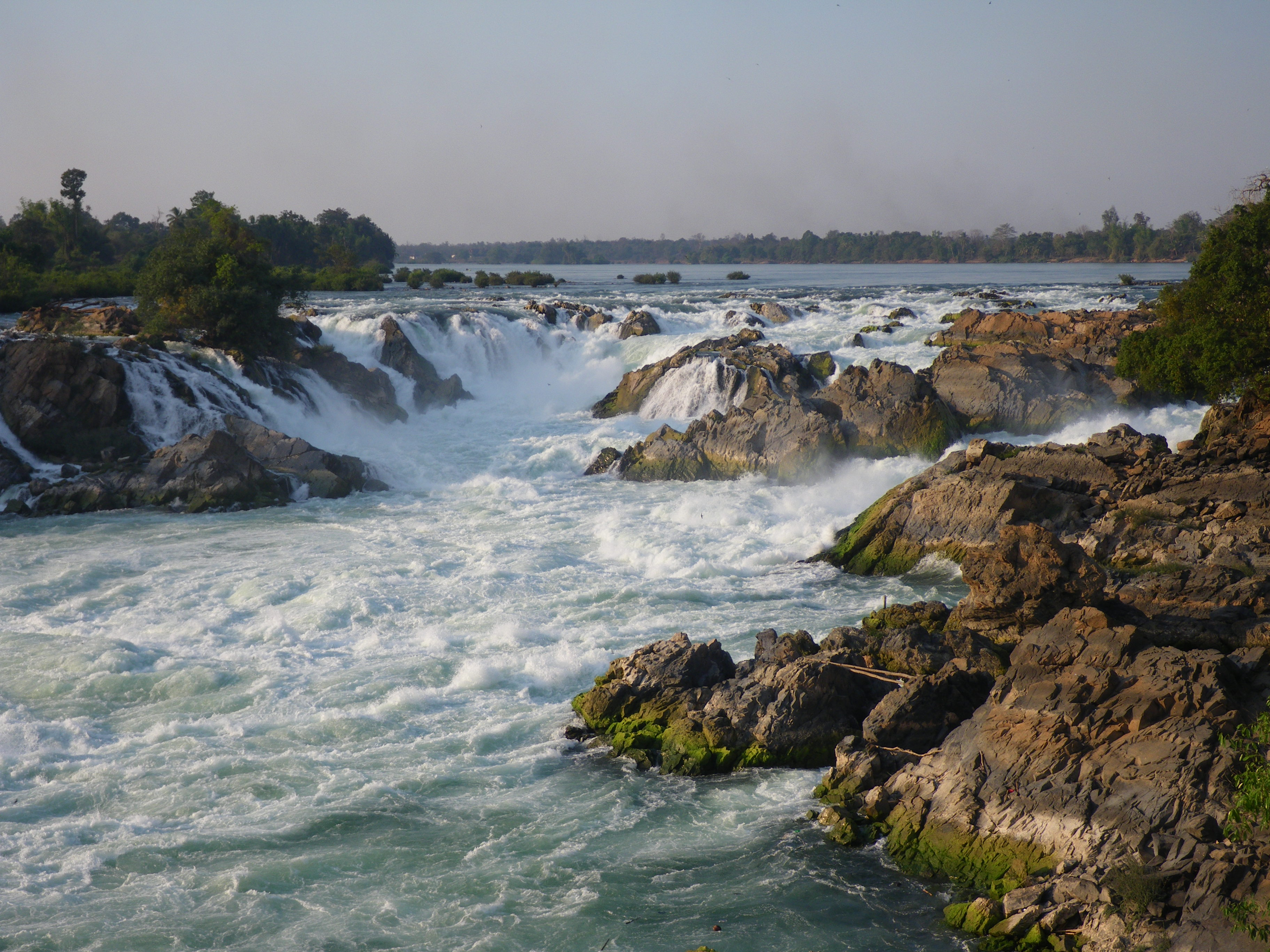
The Khone Falls in Southern Laos

In spite of the rapids, which for the moment ended any plans and efforts of establishing a route to China, the expedition continued to ascend upstream into Yunnan, China. The focus had shifted to scientific recordings, surveys and notes on topography, physical geography, demographics and social observations of the river valley. De Carné reflects on the shifting of motivations for the expedition:

The principal results which were expected from the exploration of the Mekong may be summed up in a few words. It was desired, first, that the old maps should be rectified, and the navigability of the river tried, it being our hope that we might bind together French Cochin-China and the western provinces of China by means of it. Were the rapids, of whose existence we knew, an absolute barrier? Were the islands of Khon an impassable difficulty? Was there any truth in the opinion of geographers who, believed that there was a communication between the Meïnam and the Mekong? To gather information respecting the sources of the latter, if it proved impossible to reach them; to solve the different geographical problems which would naturally offer, was the first part of the programme the commission had to carry out.[sic]

In April, the mission arrived in Luang Prabang, where the exhausted men rested for four weeks and obtained their passports for China. However, the difficult territories ahead and the region's politically unstable principalities affected appropriate future travel plans and the men's confidence. After much debate over the further route, the expedition left on 25 May 1867.

=== From Burma to China ===
On 18 June 1867 the men, whose health and condition had begun to seriously deteriorate and among whom malaria was widespread, left Siamese controlled territory and entered the Upper Mekong sector under Burmese rule. Shortly after the expedition left the Mekong and proceeded - on a much slower pace - on foot and oxcarts, that had been hired from local merchants. Progress, though was dragged even more by uncooperative official agents and the unpredictable local lords, who sporadically denied or granted permission to set foot on their lands.

In August de Lagrée left the by now seriously disease-ridden and feverish men behind at the village of Mong Yawng in order to seek diplomatic support from the influential Shan States who might help with the mission's progress.

Reunited after three weeks the expedition progressed and reached the borderlands to China by the end of September. On 7 October 1867 they crossed the Mekong via ferry, seeing the river for the last time. Once in China desperately needed clothes, shoes and equipment could be acquired and herbal remedies improved the men's health. At Ssu-Mao, Yunnan the travellers were yet again halted, this time by the Panthay Rebellion.

They now pondered over the dilemma of whether to continue exploring the Mekong, or to conduct a commercial survey of southern China and abandon the river. Carné wrote: "We were compelled by the Mussulman revolt to leave the Mekong, in order to gain the Songkoi; to abandon geography, and solve a problem of more practical and immediate importance" and "At this moment, the commercial question won out as the impracticalities of continuing the scientific mapping of the Mekong became apparent."

After several months strenuous march in torrential rains, through thick jungle, over rugged and mountainous terrain on 3,000 m (9,800 ft) high narrow rocky paths, the men arrived at the Jinsha River in January 1868.

South of Dali-fu, the mission reached a tragic climax having learnt of the death of the expedition's leader, de Lagrée, who succumbed to an abscess of the liver at Hui-tse on 12 March 1868.

Francis Garnier took command of the mission after de Lagrée's death and safely led the expedition to Shanghai and the Chinese coast via the Yangtze River and finally set sail for the South China Sea towards Saigon, where they arrived on 29 June 1868.

== Consequences and conclusions ==
French and British colonial expansion in Southeast-Asia

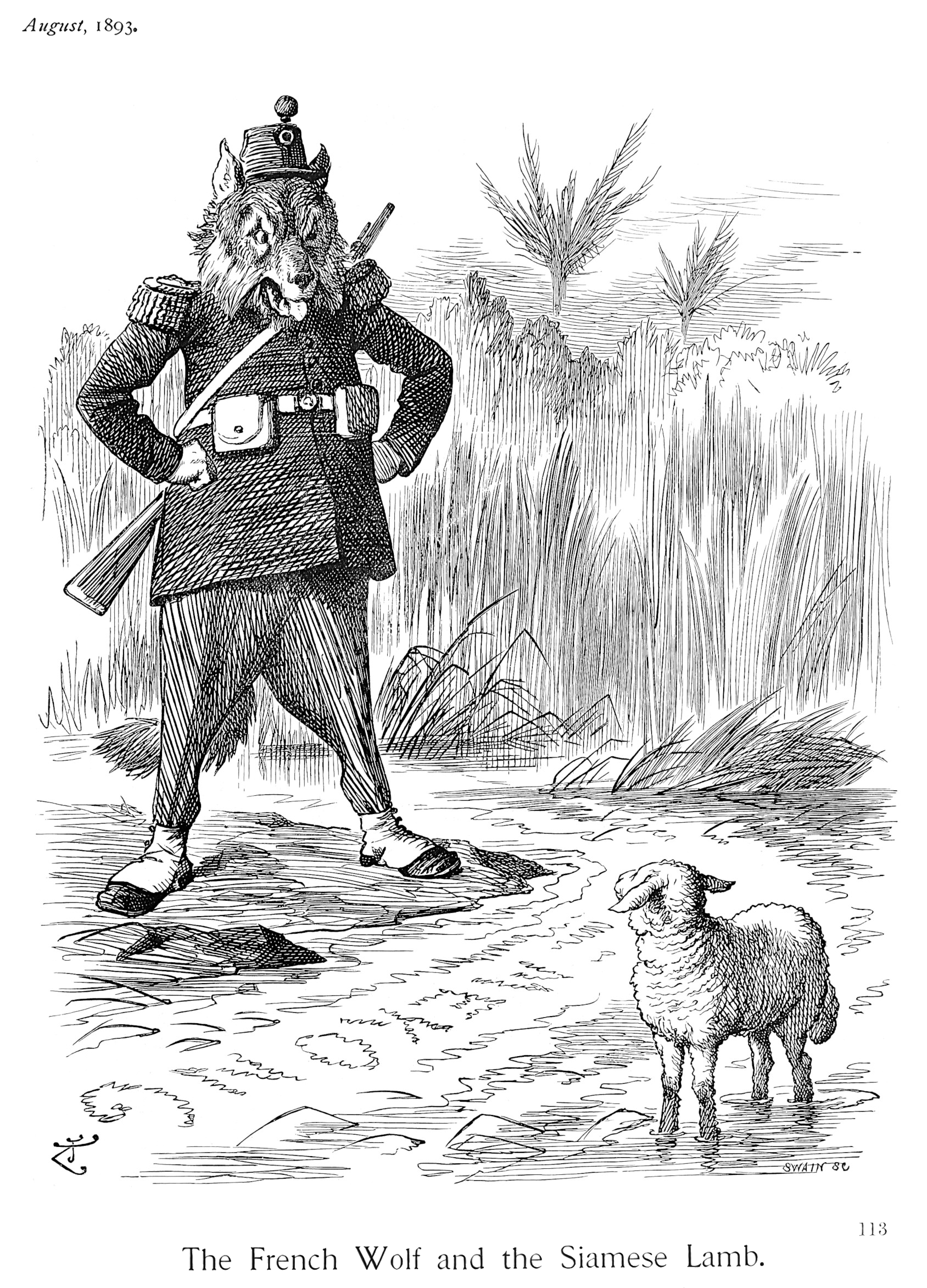
Cartoon showing the "French wolf" looking across the Mekong towards the "Siamese lamb"

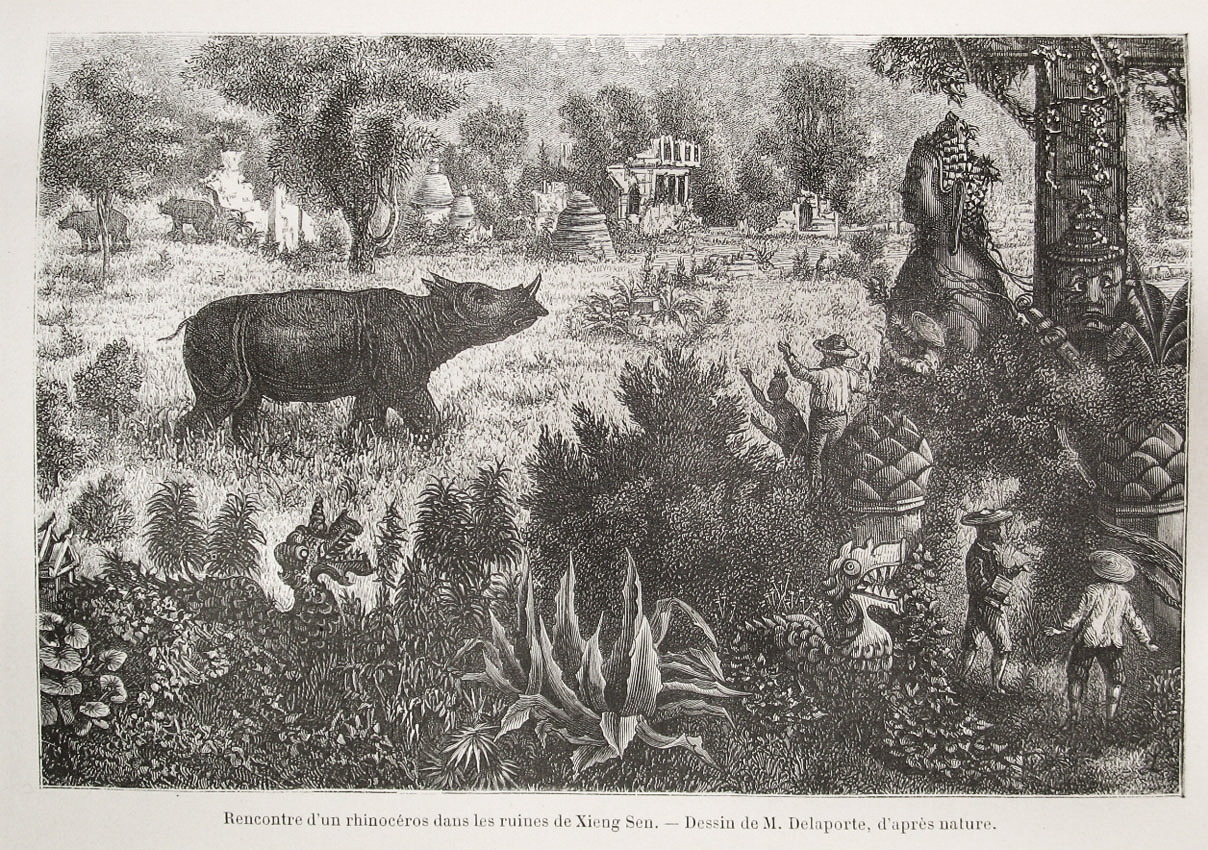
The ancient city of Chiang Saen with a rhinoceros roaming the ruins (Delaporte)

The records made over the course of two years were published in four large volumes. They "filled a thousand pages, and included surveys, observations, logs of food purchases, bottles of wine on board" and served as basis for subsequent travels. The Red River and its valley became the focus of renewed reconnaissance activities in order to find a commercial entrance into China for the French colonial empire. Just by accident the mission had discovered the potential of the Red River (Chinese: Hồng Hà, Vietnamese: Songkoi or Sông Cái), which flows from Dali in Yunnan across south-western China and Tonkin and exits via Hanoi and Haiphong into the Gulf of Tonkin. In 1872 de Carné wrote, [The Red River] "...promises to realize all the hopes and expectations which the Mekong destroyed..."

Francis Garnier received an award to be shared with David Livingstone at the 1869 Geographical Congress in Antwerp. In 1870 he received the prestigious Patron's Medal of the Royal Geographical Society in London, the highest award an explorer of any nation could possibly receive. The institution's President Sir Roderick Murchison stated, "...France has the fullest right to be proud of these doings of her gallant naval officers..." Garnier continued his travels in the service of French Indochina, trying to discover whether the Red River might be the desired route for trade with China.

=== Missions Pavie ===
Colonial civil servant, explorer, and diplomat Auguste Pavie led four missions between 1879 and 1895, covering 676,000 km^{2} (261,000 sq mi) on foot, by elephant, or down the river on rafts, producing more accurate scientific data, such as the first atlas of the Mekong and at least six volumes of observations.

=== Franco-Siamese crisis ===
The expedition members cautiously observed the Lao principalities on both sides of the river, recorded political affiliations and noted the strong Siamese influence. The fact, that on the Bolaven Plateau, east of the river a Siamese official collected taxes caused great concern. Jules Hermand was sent to Bangkok in 1881 as "consul et commissaire" to counter Siam's influence and Anglo-Siamese collaboration along with extending French control.

Further surveys, military missions and expeditions followed, which helped to create the strategic and logistical framework for the successful French colonial acquisition of Tonkin and Annam in 1884, culminating in the establishment of the Indochinese Union in 1887, territorial losses for Siam, and the Treaty of Bangkok in 1893, which, among other things, resulted in the French protectorate over Laos and Cambodia as the Mekong constituted the border between France and Siam over the course of almost 1,500 km (930 mi).

=== Narrow gauge railway ===
Passage up the Mekong past the Khone Falls was made in the mid-1890s by specially designed French steamboats, the Massie and the Lagrandière (named after governor Pierre-Paul Grandière). There had been unsuccessful attempts by other steamboats in the early-1890s to go up the falls via the river, but these two new vessels were dismantled and both taken over temporary rails and carried across Khone Island in a "prouesse d'acrobatie nautique" ("a feat of nautical acrobatics"). Pierre-Paul Lagrandière's journey up the river in 1895 was ultimately terminated at the Tang-ho rapids (also called Kemarat Falls, 145 km (90 mi) of raging white water in the former Shan State, where modern day Myanmar borders Laos), and neither of the two vessels tried to ascend the river again. In 1897 a new railway was built on Khone Island, rendering passage past the Falls of Khone much easier until the line finally fell into disrepair in the 1940s.

=== 19th century Romanticism ===
Plates from Delaporte's drawings, in which certain features—ruins, wild animals and enormous trees—are exaggerated in order to match and satisfy 19th century European tastes for the romantic helped to keep the commission in the public's mind. The drawings were widely reproduced, even to this day, on prints, postcards, calendars and tourist brochures, as well as gracing the walls of many of the better hotels in Southeast Asia.

== See also ==
- Mekong
- Red River
- Mainland Southeast Asia
- Geography of Southeast Asia
- Ernest Doudart de Lagrée
- Francis Garnier
- Louis Delaporte
- Charles Rigault de Genouilly
- Rattanakosin Kingdom of Siam
- Cochinchina
- French colonial empire
- French colonial administration of Laos
- Political administration of French Indochina
- British rule in Burma

== Bibliography ==
- Mouhot, Henri (2000). Travels in Siam, Cambodia, Laos, and Annam. White Lotus Co, Ltd. ISBN 978-974-8434-03-2.
- Osborne, Milton (1969). The French Presence in Cochinchina and Cambodia: Rule and Response (1859–1905). Ithaca, New York: Cornell University Press. ASIN B000K13QGO.
- Tarling, Nicholas (2004). Imperialism in Southeast Asia. Taylor & Francis.
- Osborne, Milton (2000). The Mekong, Turbulent Past, Uncertain Future. New York: Atlantic Monthly Press. ISBN 978-0-87113-806-4.
- Garnier, Francis (1994). The French in Indo-China: with a narrative of Garnier's explorations in Cochin-China, Annam and Tonquin. White Lotus Co, Ltd.
- Keay, John (2005). Mad About The Mekong: Exploration and Empire in South-East Asia. HarperCollins.
