= Louis Delaporte =

French explorer and artist

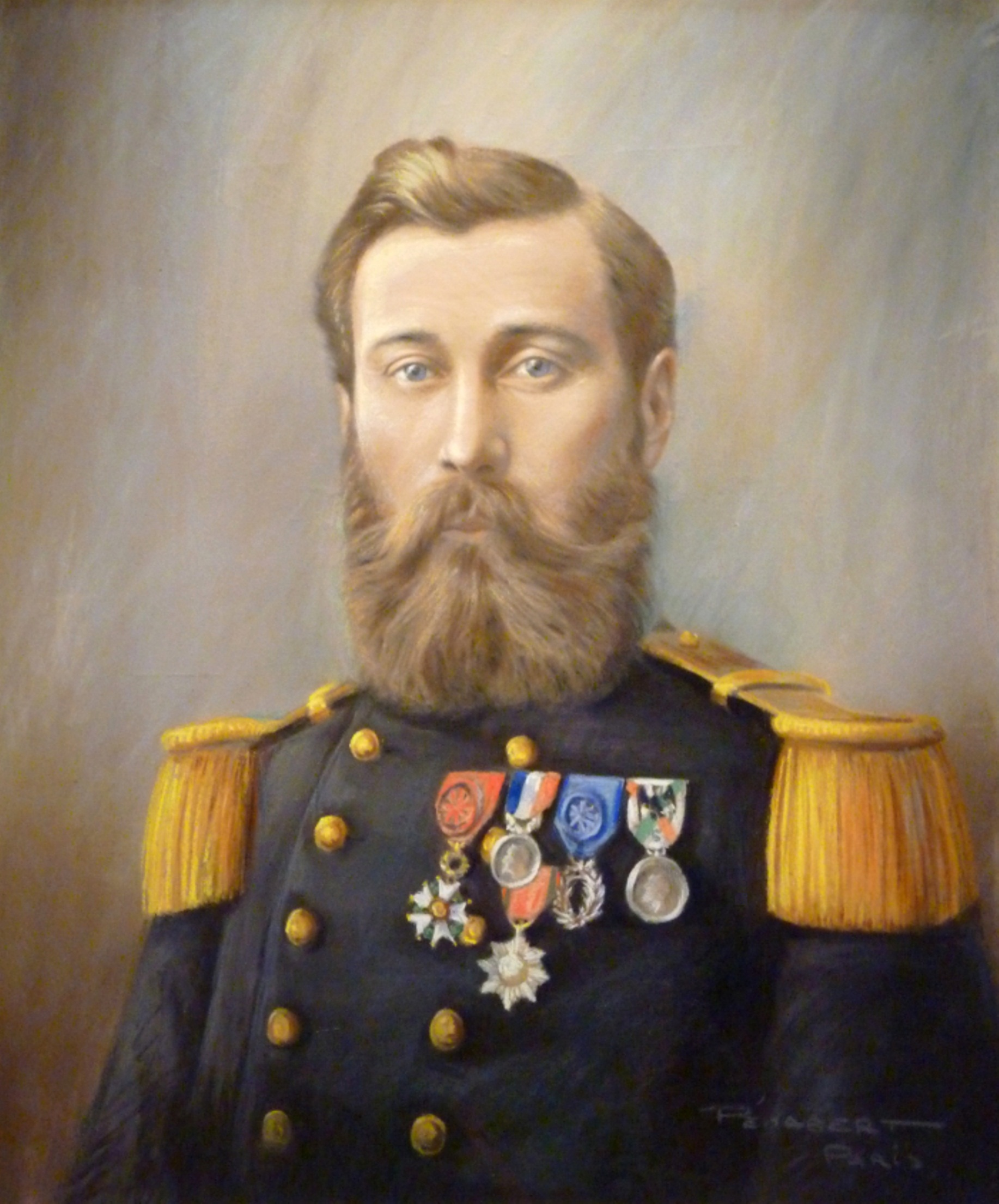
Louis Delaporte

Louis Delaporte (Loches, January 11, 1842 – Paris, May 3, 1925) was a French explorer and artist, whose collection and documentation of Khmer art formed the nucleus of exhibitions in Paris, originally at the 1878 Paris Exposition and later at the Palais du Trocadéro, where he became chief curator of the Musée Indochinois. In 1927, after his death, his collection was moved to the Guimet Museum.

== French Mekong expedition (1866–1868) ==
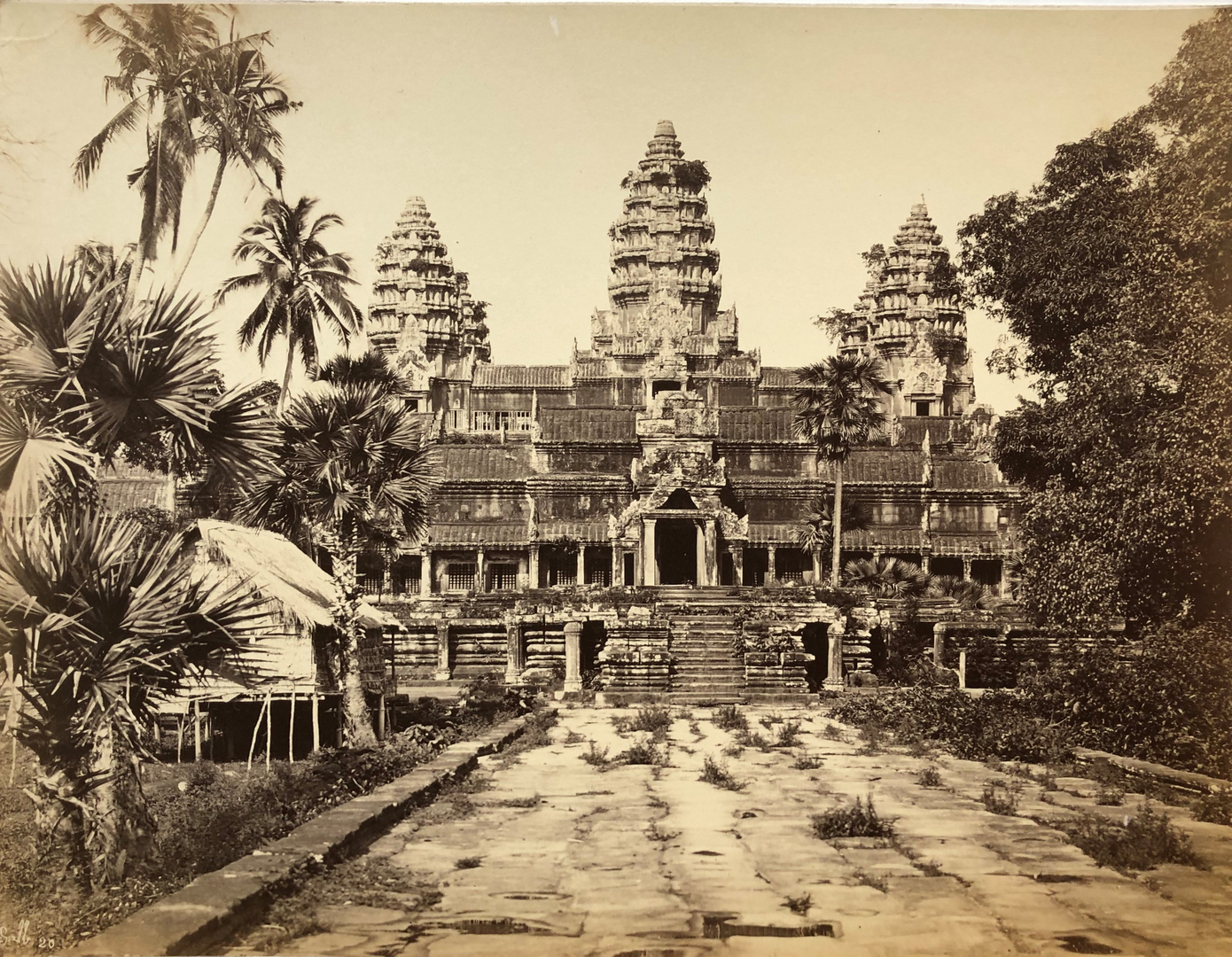
1866 photograph of Angkor Wat, as Delaporte would have first seen it

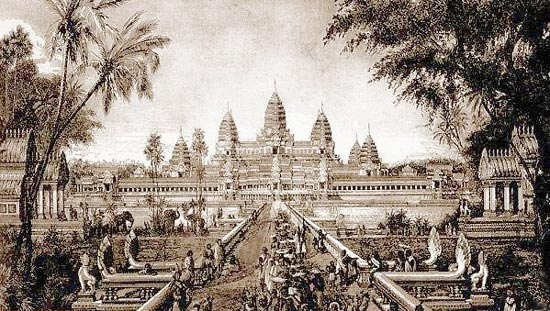
Delaporte's engraving of Angkor Wat, published in 1880

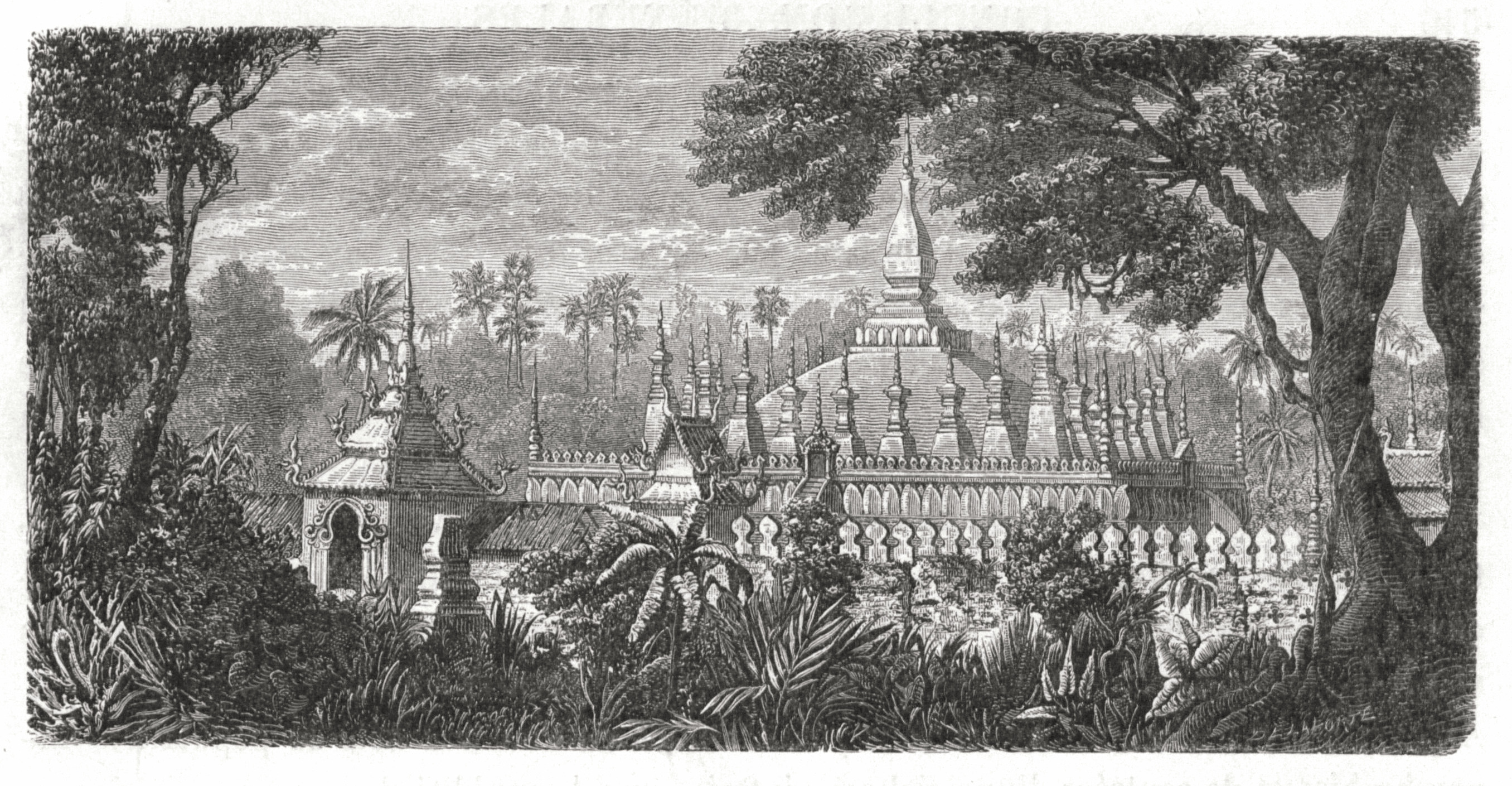
Print from a drawing by Delaporte of the temple Pha That Luang

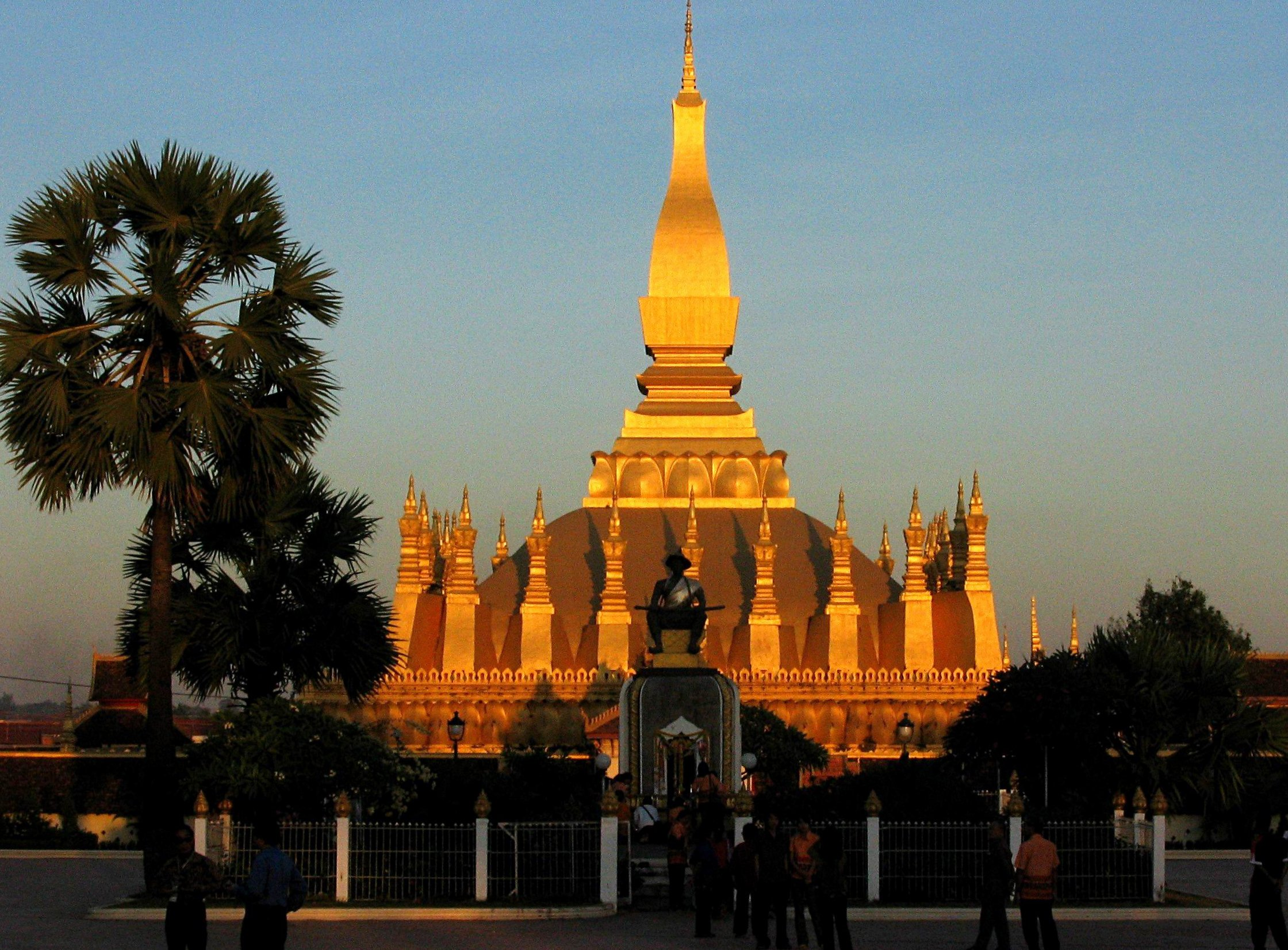
Reconstructed Pha That Luang

The first systematic exploration of the Mekong River, considered "the wildest of the world's great rivers," was the French Mekong expedition led by Ernest Doudard de Lagrée and Francis Garnier, which ascended the river from its mouth to Yunnan between 1866 and 1868. Delaporte, a young naval officer, was chosen because of his talent in drawing to accompany them through what was then French Indochina.

This expedition took the young artist to Angkor Wat. Years later, in his 1880 book Voyage au Cambodge, Delaporte recorded his impressions:

The sight of these strange ruins struck me, too, with a keen astonishment, I admired the bold and grandiose design of these monuments no less than the perfect harmony of all their parts. Khmer art, issuing from the mixture of India and China, purified, ennobled by artists whom one might call the Athenians of the Far East, has remained the most beautiful expression of human genius in this vast part of Asia that extends from the Indus to the Pacific.

The detailed drawings Delaporte made on this voyage were used to illustrate Garnier's 1870 account of the voyage. Many years later, during the 1930s, drawings Delaporte had made at That Luang became the basis for a major reconstruction of that important religious site near Vientiane. In particular, the first rebuild gave the stupa a shape that locals found unattractive; based on Delaporte's drawings it was restored to its original lotus-bud design.

The expedition was plagued by disasters and difficulties, including many miles of wading barefoot through knee-deep mud infested with leeches. Nevertheless, the team surveyed and mapped 6,000 km, charting the Mekong's course from its mouth in present-day Vietnam through present-day Cambodia, Thailand, Laos, and Burma into China. At the end of the journey, Delaporte returned to France, where he was promoted to the rank of ship's lieutenant and awarded the Légion d'Honneur.

== 1873 expedition ==
After an interruption caused by the Franco-Prussian War (1870–1871) Louis Delaporte obtained the support of France's Société de Géographie and of several French government ministries for a new expedition. This mission would have a dual purpose: to map Vietnam's Red River and to bring back Khmer art for exhibition in France.

In May 1873, his team left France taking with them many gifts, including engravings based on the works of Rembrandt and Rubens as well as copies of paintings by Nicolas Poussin and Théodore Gérard. By the end of the expedition, they brought back some 70 specimens of sculpture and architecture, all of which Delaporte affirmed had been acquired by purchase or trade, plus his own drawings, prints, and plans. Many of the sculptures had actually been removed without permission.

== Khmer art in Paris ==
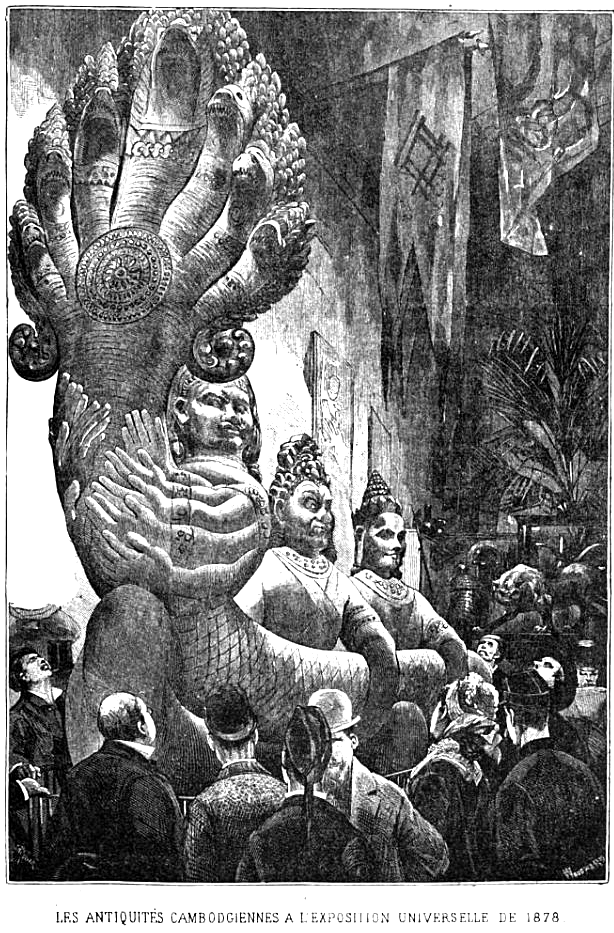
Khmer sculpture on display at l'Exposition Universelle de 1878, an engraving by Louis Delaporte

The Louvre, where Delaporte had hoped to see these acquisitions displayed, refused to accept them. Instead, he was invited to set up a museum at the Château de Compiègne. Then, in 1878, a grand Exposition Universelle opened in Paris, and many Khmer sculptures and Delaporte drawings were displayed at one of the new exhibition buildings, the Palais du Trocadéro. This display awakened much wider public interest in Khmer art, but it would not be until the foundation of the Musée Indochinois at the Palais du Trocadéro in 1882 that it would have its own gallery space in Paris for public display. On his return from his third and last expedition of 1881–82, Delaporte became its chief curator until his retirement in 1924.

== Evangelist for the importance of Khmer art ==
From his earliest encounter with Khmer architecture and sculpture, Delaporte was convinced that it should be compared to the best of Classical art:

It differs, indeed, from those great classics of the Mediterranean basin that have long captured our admiration: it is no longer these majestic colonnades, these great calm surfaces of Greece or Egypt; these are, in contrast, forms [that are] laborious, complex, tormented: overlays, multiple withdrawals, mazes, galleries shaded from daylight, jagged towers, pyramids with countless stories and arrows, a great profusion of ornaments and sculptures, constant effects of light and shadow that enrich the whole without altering its majesty, and blend beautifully with the intense light and lush tropical vegetation: it is, in short, another form of beauty.

== Publications ==
- Voyage d'exploration en Indo-Chine by Francis Garnier with illustrations by Louis Delaporte (1873)
- Voyage au Cambodge; l'architecture khmer (1880)
- Les monuments du Cambodge (1924)
- Mesopotamia: The Babylonian and Assyrian Civilization (1925)

== See also ==
- Mekong Expedition of 1866-1868
