= Quercus thorelii =

Conservation status
- Data Deficient (IUCN 3.1)

Scientific classification
- Kingdom: Plantae
- Clade: Embryophytes
- Clade: Tracheophytes
- Clade: Spermatophytes
- Clade: Angiosperms
- Clade: Eudicots
- Clade: Rosids
- Order: Fagales
- Family: Fagaceae
- Genus: Quercus
- Subgenus: Quercus subg. Cerris
- Section: Quercus sect. Cyclobalanopsis
- Species: Q. thorelii

Binomial name
- Quercus thorelii Hickel & A.Camus

Synonyms
- Cyclobalanopsis chingsiensis (Y.T.Chang) Y.T.Chang; Cyclobalanopsis subhinoidea (Chun & W.C.Ko) Y.C.Hsu & H.Wei Jen ex Y.T.Chang; Cyclobalanopsis thorelii (Hickel & A.Camus) Hu; Quercus chingsiensis Y.T.Chang; Quercus hsiensiui Chun & W.C.Ko; Quercus subhinoidea Chun & W.C.Ko

Species of oak tree

Quercus thorelii is an Asian species of tree in the beech family Fagaceae. The species is named after the French botanist Clovis Thorel. It has been found in Indochina (Laos, Vietnam) and in southern China (Guangxi, Yunnan). It is placed in subgenus Cerris, section Cyclobalanopsis, the ring-cupped oaks.

Quercus thorelii is a tree up to 30 m. tall. Twigs are covered with star-shaped hairs. Leaves can be as much as 170 mm long. The acorn is oblate, 10-15 × 25-30 mm, light brown, densely tomentose, apex depressed, with a scar that is approx. 20 mm in diameter.
