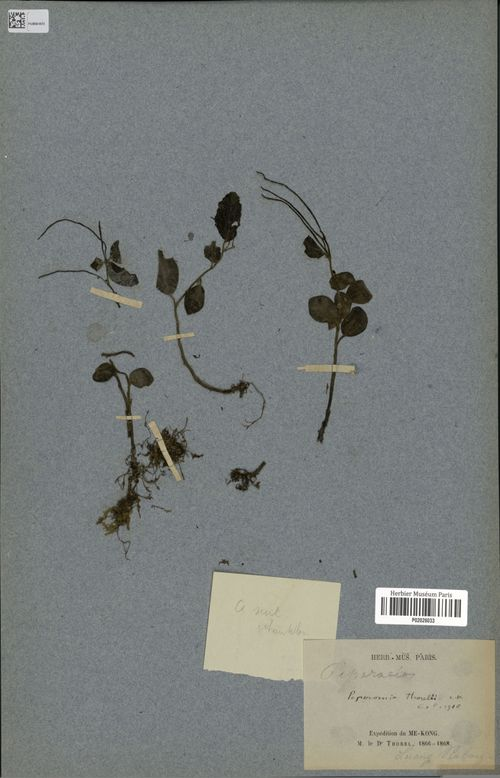

Scientific classification
- Kingdom: Plantae
- Clade: Tracheophytes
- Clade: Angiosperms
- Clade: Magnoliids
- Order: Piperales
- Family: Piperaceae
- Genus: Peperomia
- Species: P. thorelii

Binomial name
- Peperomia thorelii C.DC.

= Peperomia thorelii =

Species of epiphyte

Peperomia thorelii is a species of epiphyte in the genus Peperomia found in Vietnam. It primarily grows on wet tropical biomes. Its conservation status is Not Threatened.

== Taxonomy and naming ==
It was described in 1910 by Casimir de Candolle in "Flore générale de l'Indo-Chine.", from collected specimens on Vietnam in 1841. It gets its name from Clovis Thorel, an explorer of Indochina.

== Distribution and habitat ==
It is endemic to Vietnam. It grows on epiphyte environment and is a herb. It grows on wet tropical biomes.

== Conservation ==
This species is listed as Threatened under the Angiosperm Extinction Risk Predictions v1.
