= Neothorelia =

Scientific classification
- Kingdom: Plantae
- Clade: Tracheophytes
- Clade: Angiosperms
- Clade: Eudicots
- Clade: Rosids
- Order: Brassicales
- Family: Capparaceae
- Genus: Neothorelia; Gagnep.
- Species: N. laotica

Binomial name
- Neothorelia laotica Gagnep.

Species of flowering plant

Neothorelia is a monotypic genus of flowering plants belonging to the family Capparaceae. The only species is Neothorelia laotica Gagnep..

It is native to Laos in Indo-China.

The genus name of Neothorelia is in honour of Clovis Thorel (1833–1911), a French botanist, explorer and doctor. The Latin specific epithet of laotica means "of Laos", the place where the plant was found. Both the genus and the species were first described and published in Bull. Soc. Bot. France Vol.55 on page 269 in 1908.
