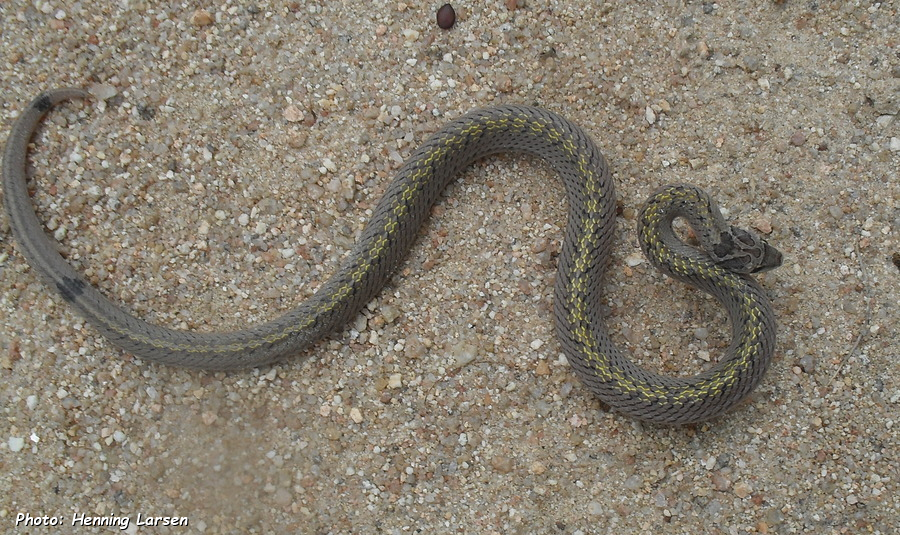

Conservation status
- Least Concern (IUCN 3.1)

Scientific classification
- Kingdom: Animalia
- Phylum: Chordata
- Class: Reptilia
- Order: Squamata
- Suborder: Serpentes
- Family: Colubridae
- Genus: Oligodon
- Species: O. mouhoti

Binomial name
- Oligodon mouhoti (Boulenger, 1914)

Synonyms
- Simotes taeniatus var. mouhoti Boulenger, 1914; Holarchus taeniatus mouhoti (Boulenger, 1914)

= Oligodon mouhoti =

Species of snake

Oligodon mouhoti, also known commonly as the Cambodian kukri snake and Mouhot's kukri snake, is a species of snake in the subfamily Colubrinae of the family Colubridae. The species is native to Southeast Asia.

== Etymology ==
Oligodon mouhoti was named after French naturalist Henri Mouhot.

== Description ==
Oligodon mouhoti may attain a total length (tail included) of 34 cm (13 in). It has 14–16 maxillary teeth, the last two greatly enlarged. It usually has eight upper labials. The dorsal scales are arranged in 17 rows at midbody, and reduced to 15 rows posteriorly. The anal plate is entire (undivided).

== Geographic distribution ==
Oligodon mouhoti is found in Cambodia and Thailand, and possibly in Laos and southern Vietnam.

== Habitat ==
The preferred natural habitat of Oligodon mouhoti is forest, at elevations of 400–600 m (1,300–2,000 ft).

== Behavior ==
Oligodon mouhoti is terrestrial.

== Reproduction ==
Oligodon mouhoti is oviparous.
