= Political administration of French Indochina =

French administration in Indochina began June 5, 1862, when the Treaty of Saigon ceded three provinces. By 1887 the French administered all of Indochina.

== Prelude – French conquest of Indochina ==
The French invasion of Indochina was sparked off by the execution of Christian missionaries. With the defeat of Vietnamese Emperor Tự Đức signed the Treaty of Saigon, ceding Cochinchina's three eastern provinces. Later, the French forced the Emperor to place Cambodia under French protection. On June 18, 1867, the French seized the rest of Cochinchina and conquered the Mekong Delta and later Hanoi. By 1887, France controlled all of Indochina.

== Provinces ==
Each of the provinces – Cambodia, Laos, Annam, Tonkin, Cochinchina and Kouang-Tchéou-Wan – had different legal statuses. Hence, political structure might differ from one province to another.

=== Vietnam ===
The first thing the French had to deal with was the royalty. Rather than abolishing the monarchy as the British had done in Burma, France preserved native monarchs in a suzerain relationship. The political structure resembled that of Cambodia and Laos, with France exercising ultimate control over legislative and executive powers.

=== Cochinchina ===
The supreme executive authority lay in the hands of the governor, assisted by a Privy Council and a Colonial Council. The Privy Council resembled the Executive Council and the Colonial Council resembled the Legislative Assembly in the British colonial system. The colony in Cochinchina was divided into major districts and a French administrative officer was appointed as the head of each district. The Colonial Council focused on colonial laws, land, domestic transportation and public works. The Privy Council was in charge of finance, taxation, and militia.

=== Cambodia and Laos ===
The nobility, the monarchy and the hierarchy of mandarins, were preserved and they existed alongside the French. However, the executive authority remained in the hands of the résident-supérieur, assisted by a Privy Council and a Protectorate Council similar to Cochinchina. Each protectorate was divided into provinces under French Residents. However, in contrast with Cochinchina, the rule was less direct. The actual administration was carried out by the collaborating local officials under the supervision of their French opposite numbers, who never intervened directly unless there was a dire need to do so. Despite so, French control could not be challenged and remained absolute.

=== Kouang-Tchéou-Wan ===
Unlike the rest of French Indochina, which were either a colony or protectorates, Kouang-Tchéou-Wan was a leased territory which France leased from China under a treaty for 99 years.

== Direct or indirect rule ==
On paper, Cochinchina was the only portion with direct rule imposed. The province was legally annexed to the French under the Treaty of Saigon. The rest of the provinces, Tonkin, Annam, Cambodia and Laos, remained as French protectorates. However, the differences between direct and indirect rule "was a legal rather than a practical one". Political interference was as every bit intrusive in Cochinchina as Laos.

== Assimilation vs. association ==
The French adopted a policy of assimilation rather than association. The policy of association allowed the colonialists to rule through native rulers while upholding their traditional cultures and hierarchy, similar to British rule in Malaya. However, the French ruled out that option and chose to adopt the policy of assimilation. This was due to the French experience in 1789 French Revolution and Napoleonic era. The Declaration of Rights of Man was based on the principle of egalité, liberté and fraternité for all subjects and citizens of France, and the colonies could not be an exception. French language was to be the language of administration. The whole Indochina would be "Frenchized". Napoleonic Code was introduced in 1879 into the five provinces, sweeping away the Confucianism that has existed for centuries in Indochina.

== Doumer's reforms ==
Doumer, who was sent by French government to administer Indochina in 1897, made a series of reforms that would last till the collapse of French authority in Indochina. First, he gave greater political autonomy to Cambodian monarch and limited the executive authority of resident-general in return for Cambodian recognition of French land titles and opening of its economy. In Annam, he decided to preserve the monarchy to gain legitimacy for the French. He created the High Council that included the French Privy Counsellors and Presidents of Chambers of Commerce. Financial system was reformed and refined in such a way that he was able to create a reserve.

== The impact of French reforms ==
The resulting policy of assimilation disregarded all Annamite traditions in favor of turning the Indochinese into Frenchmen. Unfortunately, the values and customs of the French are mostly conflicting with the traditions of the Indochinese. For example, The French valued individualism; the Indochinese appreciated their collectivism. Hence the destruction of many of Indochinese long-existing traditions provided a dangerous ground of resentment and rebellion. As reforms were introduced, new social classes were developed and Western thinking began to seep in, Annamite intellectuals began truly to understand the devastating effects of French influence on their society. Something had to change. Unfortunately, as most often in the struggle for independence, change meant war. Changes in the political and social consciousness of the Annamite population between 1920 and 1945—and the ability of the French to control numerous aspects of Annamite life, the alteration of the village economy and social relationships, and the introduction of a cash economy—all contributed to the onset of the Vietnam War.

== See also ==
- French colonial administration of Laos
