= Francis Garnier =

French explorer and colonial administrator in Indochina (1839–1873)

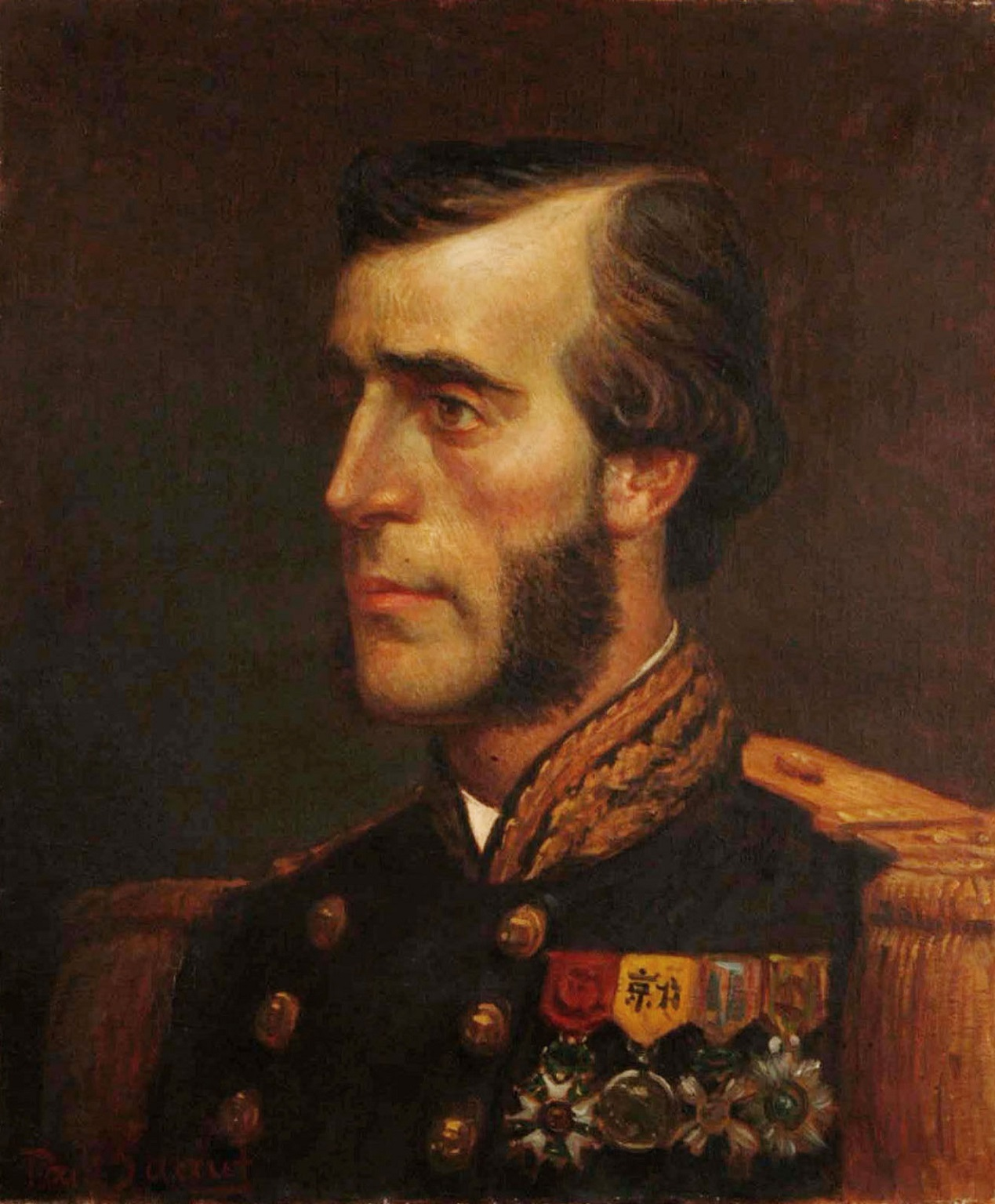
- Lieutenant de vaisseau Francis Garnier
- Born: Marie Joseph François Garnier; 25 July 1839; Saint-Etienne, France
- Died: 21 December 1873 (aged 34); Hanoi, Vietnam
- Spouse: Claire Knight (m. 1870)
- Children: 1
- Military career
- Allegiance: Second French Empire (French Third Republic) French Republic
- Branch: French navy
- Service years: 1855–1873
- Rank: Lieutenant
- Conflicts: Second Opium War; Cochinchina Campaign; Franco-Prussian War
- Awards: Legion of Honour

Marie Joseph François Garnier (Vietnamese: Ngạc Nhi; 25 July 1839 – 21 December 1873) was a French officer, inspector of Indigenous Affairs of Cochinchina and explorer. He eventually became mission leader of the Mekong Exploration Commission in 19th century Southeast Asia.

== Early career ==
Francis Garnier was born on 25 July 1839 in Saint-Étienne, as the second son of Louis-Alexandre Garnier and Anne Marie Félicité Garnier. In 1855, at 16, he joined the Ecole Navale, much to the dismay of his family who disapproved a military career, deeming it as being dangerous.

In early 1860, 20 years old Garnier, then serving as an aspirant on the Duperré during the Second Opium War, jumped into a stormy sea at night to save the life of a cavalry lieutenant who had fallen overboard. For this act of bravery, Garnier was immediately promoted to ensign and was attached to the staff of Admiral Charner.

Under Admiral Charner he fought in the Cochinchina Campaign and notably took part in the storming of the Kỳ Hòa lines.

After some time spent in France, Garnier returned to the East, and in 1862, he was appointed inspector of native affairs in Cochinchina, and entrusted with the administration of Cholon, a suburb of Saigon.

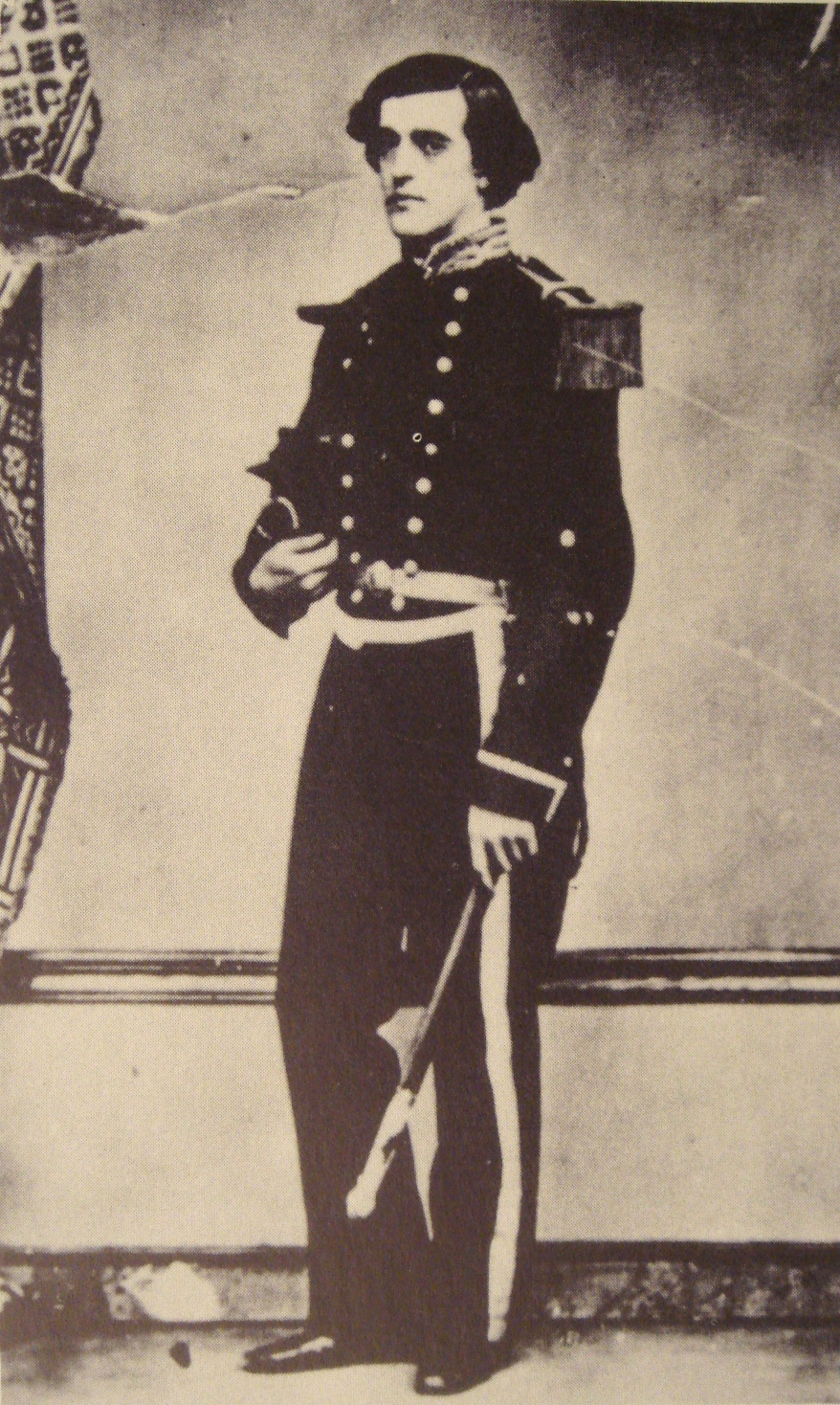
Francis Garnier, as an Enseigne de vaisseau in the 1860s.

== Exploration of the Mekong and Yangtze rivers ==
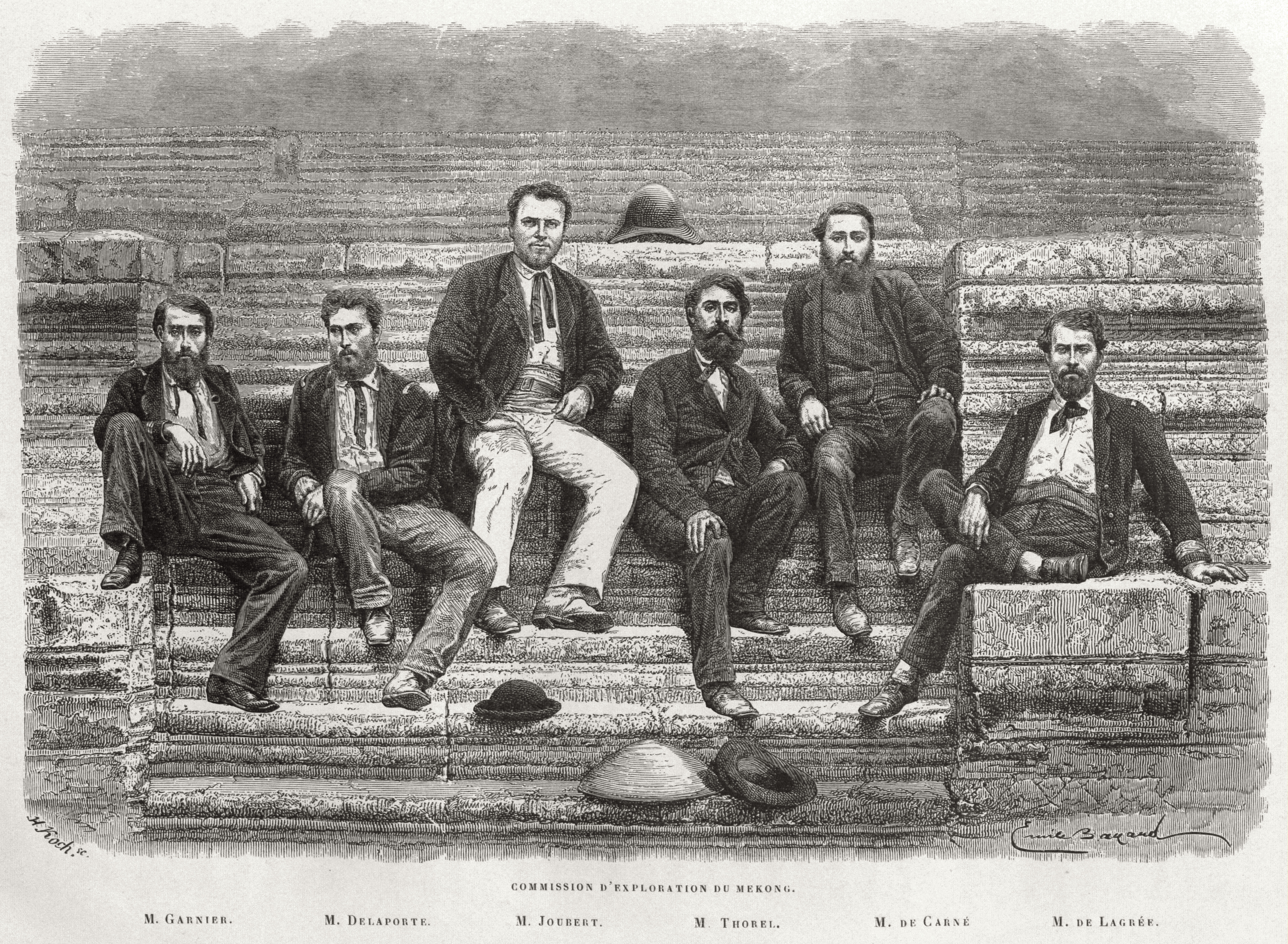
Mekong Exploration Commission. Garnier at the left.

It was at his suggestion that the Marquis de Chasseloup-Laubat determined to send a mission to explore the valley of the Mekong River, but as Garnier was not considered old enough to be put in command, the chief authority was entrusted to Captain Ernest Doudard de Lagrée. In the course of the expedition – to quote the words of Sir Roderick Murchison addressed to the youthful traveller when, in 1870, he was presented with the Patron's Medal of the Royal Geographical Society of London – "from Kratié in Cambodia to Shanghai 5392 miles were traversed, and of these, 3625 miles, chiefly of country unknown to European geography, were surveyed with care, and the positions fixed by astronomical observations, nearly the whole of the observations being taken by Garnier himself". A year earlier he received an award to be shared with David Livingstone at the 1869 Geographical Congress in Antwerp.

Volunteering to lead a detachment to Dali, the capital of Sultan Suleiman, the sovereign of the Muslim rebels in Yunnan, Garnier successfully carried out the more-than-adventurous enterprise. When shortly afterwards Lagrée died, Garnier naturally assumed the command of the expedition, and he conducted it in safety to the Yangtze River, and thus to the Chinese coast. On his return to France, he was received with enthusiasm. The preparation of his narrative was interrupted by the Franco-Prussian War

== Franco-Prussian War ==
During the siege of Paris, Garnier served as principal staff officer to the admiral in command of the eighth sector. His experiences during the siege were published anonymously in the feuilleton of Le Temps, and appeared separately as Le Siège de Paris, journal d'un officier de marine (1871).

One day, while he was carrying a wagon full of ammunitions to the Fort of Vanves alongside 40 fellow fighters, the convoy came under a brutal rain of Prussian shells. All of the surviving men ran away forsaking their mission, except for Garnier and a man of the National Guard who held on and brought the wagon to destination, just the two of them.

Returning to Cochinchina, he found the political circumstances of the country unfavourable to further exploration, so accordingly, he went to China, and in 1873 followed the upper course of the Yangtze River to the waterfalls.

== Intervention in Tonkin ==
In late summer 1873, a dispute between French trader Jean Dupuis and the Vietnamese authorities had created a diplomatic crisis in Hanoi. On the demand of the Vietnamese imperial court, Garnier was sent by Admiral Dupré to resolve the dispute and to expel Dupuis and his mercenaries from the Tonkin. Garnier's expeditionary force consisted of 180 men and two gunboats.

Garnier departed from Saigon with half of the expeditionary force on 11 October 1873 and reached Hanoi on 5 November. As Garnier and his men arrived in the city, neither General Nguyễn Tri Phương, nor any of his mandarins came to meet them. Dupuis, however, warmly welcomed the French. After meeting with Dupuis, Garnier attempted to negotiate with the local authorities, but since the mandarins refused to negotiate, he began considering military action. On 12 November, the remainder of the expeditionary force arrived, and Garnier decided to capture the city despite having received no orders to do so.

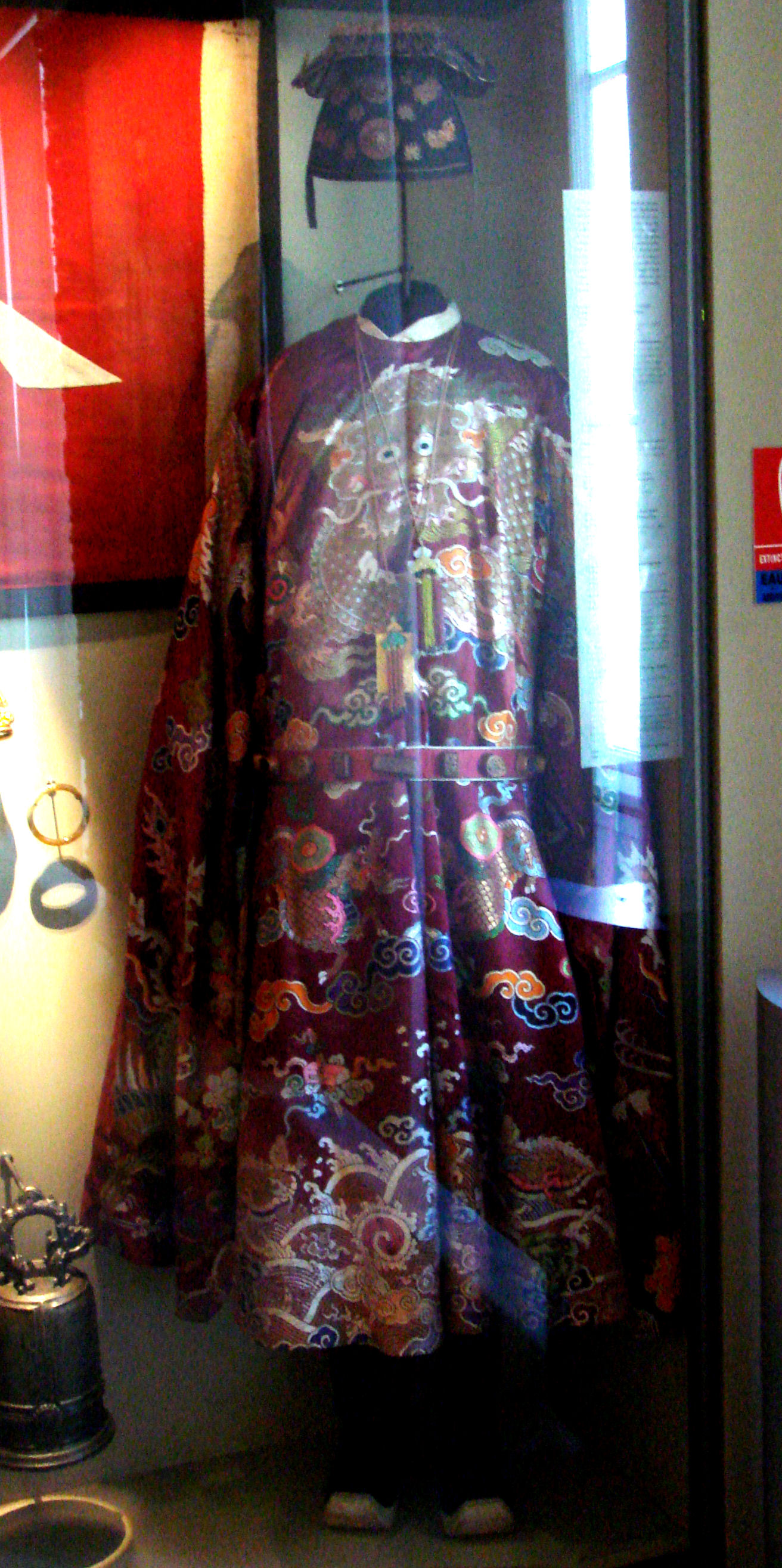
Ceremonial dress of Nguyễn Tri Phương, taken as a trophy by Garnier.

On 20 November at dawn, Garnier and his 180 men stormed the citadel of Hanoi, which was defended by 7,000 soldiers. Completely dumbfounded by the French attack, the defenders performed poorly, and when General Nguyễn Tri Phương was severely injured, their morale completely collapsed. As French troops entered through the southern gates, most of the defenders ran away through the northern gate. In less than an hour, the French had captured the citadel. The only French casualty was one of Dupuis's Chinese mercenaries, who had accidentally been killed by French sailors. Vietnamese casualties however were heavy, as they had lost 80 killed, 300 wounded and 2,000 captured. Nguyễn Tri Phương was badly injured and died of his wounds on 20 December.

Emboldened by this crushing victory, Garnier and his men soon launched an unsanctioned military campaign that resulted in the conquest of the entire Red River Delta within two weeks. One of his subordinates, 24-year-old ensign Balny d'Avricourt, conquered the citadels of Phu Ly and Hai Duong with only 30 men. On 5 December, 21-year-old aspirant Hautefeuille captured the citadel of Ninh Binh with six sailors and a Vietnamese interpreter after taking the governor hostage. On 11 December, Garnier himself conquered the citadel of Nam Dinh, and the expeditionary force received its first casualties as five sailors were wounded.

With the fall of Nam Dinh on 11 December, the French force was in control of the entire Red River Delta.

== Death in battle near Hanoi ==
Completely overwhelmed by the lightning French conquest, the Vietnamese authorities had sought the help of Liu Yongfu and his Black Flag Army, a group of Chinese outlaws, composed largely of veterans of the Taiping Rebellion, who had settled in Northern Vietnam.

On 21 December 1873 Liu Yongfu and around 600 Black Flags (French: pavillons noirs, drapeaux noirs), marching beneath an enormous black banner, approached the west gate of Hanoi. A large Vietnamese army followed in their wake. Garnier began shelling the Black Flags with a field piece mounted above the gate, and when they began to fall back he led a party of 18 French marines and sailors out of the city to pursue them, hoping to inflict some decisive blow. The counter-attack failed. Garnier, leading three men uphill in a bayonet attack on a party of Black Flags, was stabbed and hacked to death by several Black Flag soldiers after stumbling in a watercourse. The youthful enseigne de vaisseau Adrien Balny d'Avricourt led an equally small column out of the citadel to support Garnier, but was also killed at the head of his men. Three French sailors were also killed in these sorties, and the others fled back to the citadel after their officers fell.

Colonel Thomazi, the historian of French Indochina, gave the following detailed description of Garnier's last moments:

At midday on 21 December he was in conference with the ambassadors when an interpreter ran up, announcing that bands of Black Flags were attacking the town by the western gate. He immediately hurried to the spot, but some of his men had got there before him, and their fire had sufficed to force the bandits to retreat behind the bamboo hedges. A 40-millimetre gun arrived at this moment. Garnier rallied a dozen men, three of whom dragged this small cannon, and left the town at a run to pursue the enemy. As the gun could not move quickly enough across the fields, he left it behind with its gunners. He then divided the nine men who remained with him into three groups. The first two groups moved off to the left and the right, to rejoin one another further on, while he marched in the middle, followed only by two men. One and a half kilometres from the town he found himself in front of a dyke, and slipped and fell while trying to cross it. Some Black Flags hidden behind the dyke ran out, while others opened fire. At this moment the two men who were accompanying Garnier were 100 metres behind him. One of them was killed by a bullet and the other wounded. Garnier cried, 'To me, brave boys, and we'll give them a thrashing!' He then fired the six rounds from his revolver in an attempt to rescue himself, but the bandits surrounded him, pierced him with thrusts of sabres and lances, cut off his head, odiously mutilated his corpse, and ran away. The two other groups, rushing up to the sound of the shooting, were only able to recover his bloodied corpse and bring it back to Hanoi.

Despite having killed the leader of the French force, the Black Flags and Vietnamese retreated without having retaken Hanoi. Though the death of Garnier was a severe blow to the expeditionary force, his men nevertheless remained in control of the entire region. However, the conquest had not been allowed by the French authorities, and another lieutenant named Paul-Louis-Félix Philastre had been sent to terminate the campaign as soon as the news of Garnier's attack on Hanoi reached Saigon. Philastre arrived a few days after Garnier's death and immediately ordered the evacuation of the conquered cities in early 1874.

The heads of Garnier, Balny d'Avricourt and the other three French sailors killed in the 21 December attack were returned to the French on 6 January.

On 15 March 1874, the Treaty of Saigon was then signed between France and Vietnam. In exchange for France having given back the conquered cities, Vietnam formally recognized French sovereignty over Cochinchina, opened the Red River to French trade and allowed the establishment of small French garrisons in Hanoi and Haiphong.

== Achievement ==
Garnier's chief fame rests on the fact that he both conceived the idea of exploring the Mekong and carried out the larger portion of the work. During the French colonial period he was also honoured for his feats of arms in Tonkin, which paved the way for the eventual French conquest of Tonkin in the 1880s.

== Commemoration ==
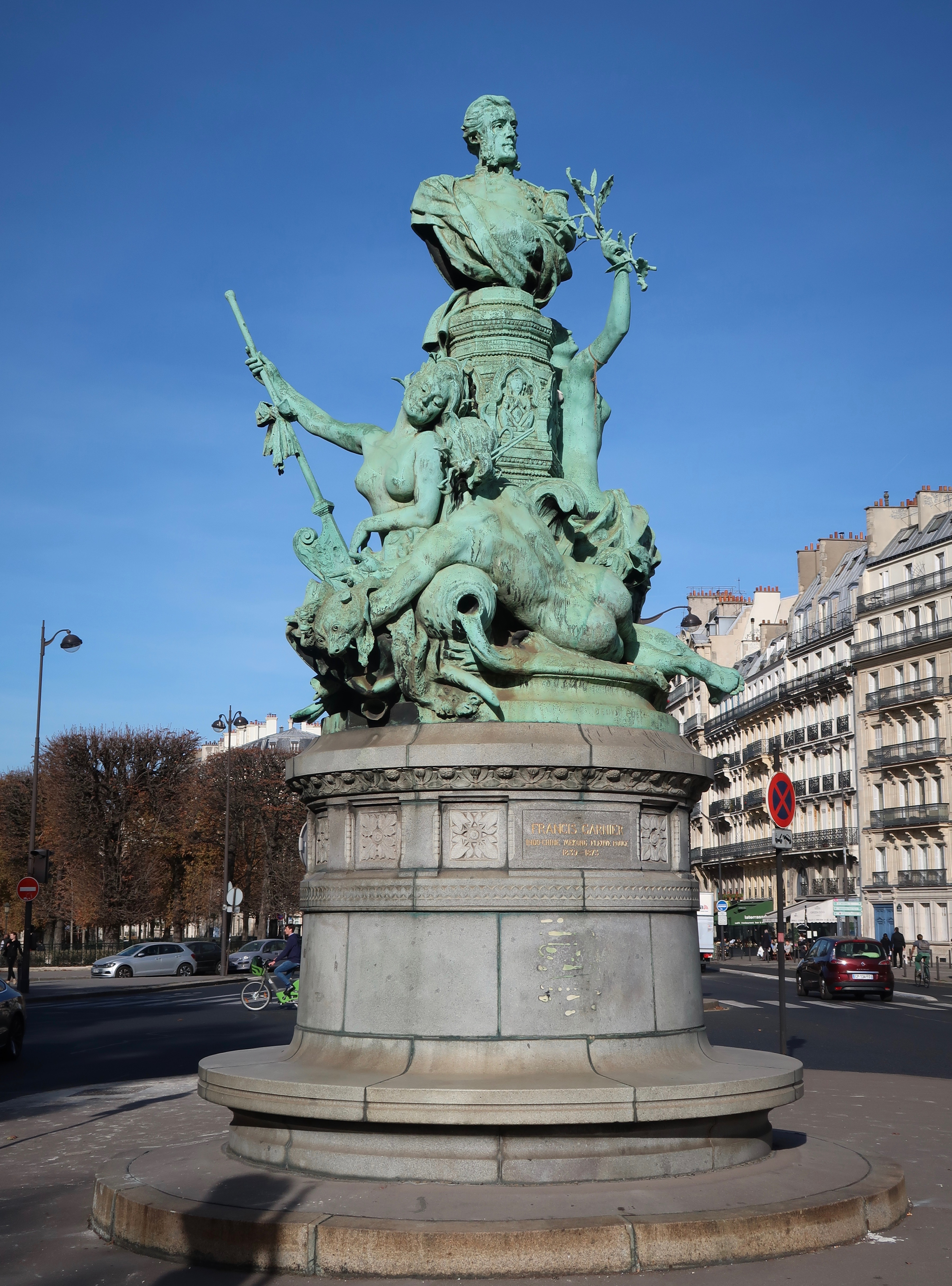
Francis Garnier Monument, erected 1898 in Paris

In 1883, nine years after Francis Garnier's death, the French naval officer Henri Rivière was also killed by the Black Flags in Tonkin, in remarkably similar circumstances.

Garnier and Rivière were honoured during the French colonial period as the two pre-eminent French martyrs of the conquest of Tonkin. In 1884, during the Sino-French War, two gunboats of the Tonkin Flotilla were named after the two men.

During the siege of Tuyên Quang (November 1884–March 1885), Liu Yung-fu's Black Flags, who formed part of the besieging Chinese army, taunted the men of the French garrison by chanting the names of their two most famous victims: 'Garnier! Rivière! Garnier! Rivière!'

In 1911, the town Beni Haoua in French Algeria was renamed 'Francis Garnier', and retained this name until the independence in 1962.

In 1943, French Indochina issued a postage stamp commemorating Garnier.

- A warship was named after him during World War II but was scuttled after a fight with the Japanese, near the Cambodian town of Kratié.
- In 1973 the landing ship Francis Garnier, was built. It still is in service and was ordered to assist the humanitarian efforts following the 2010 Haiti earthquake as part of Opération Séisme Haiti 2010. She left Martinique carrying 60 Army personnel, land vehicles and excavators; and various relief shipments.

== See also ==
- Henri Rivière
- French landing ship Francis Garnier
- Ernest Doudart de Lagrée
- Mekong Expedition of 1866–68

== Bibliography ==
- Baker, Daniel ed. Explorers and Discoverers of the World. Detroit: Gale Research, 1993
- Chisholm, Hugh, ed. (1911). "Garnier, Marie Joseph François" . Encyclopædia Britannica. Vol. 11 (11th ed.). Cambridge University Press. p. 472.
- Lonlay, D. de, Le siège de Tuyen-Quan (Paris, 1886)
- Milton Osborne, River Road to China: The Search for the Source of the Mekong, 1866–73 (Atlantic Monthly Press, 1999) ISBN 0-87113-752-6
- Milton Osborne, "Francis Garnier (1839–1873), Explorer of the Mekong River", Explorers of South-east Asia, Six Lives, ed. Victor T. King, (Kuala Lumpur: OUP, 1995)
- Milton Osborne, River Road to China: The Mekong River Expedition, 1866–1873 (London and New York, 1975)
- The narrative of the principal expedition appeared in 1873, as Voyage d'exploration en Indo-Chine effectué pendant les années 1866, 1867 et 1868, publié sous la direction de M. Francis Garnier, avec le concours de M. Delaporte et de MM. Joubert et Thorel (2 vols.) Only 800 copies were printed, and the original work is now rare.
- Transl. Walter E. J. Tips:
  - Travels in Cambodia and Part of Laos: the Mekong Exploration Commission report (1866–1868), volume 1 (White Lotus Press, 1996)
  - A pictorial journey on the old Mekong: Cambodia, Laos and Yunnan: the Mekong Exploration Commission report (1866–1868), volume 3 (White Lotus Press, 1998)
- An account of the Yang-tsze-Kiang from Garnier's pen is given in the Bulletin de la Soc. de Geog. (1874).
- His Chronique royale du Cambodje, was reprinted from the Journal Asiatique in 1872.
- Ocean Highways (1874) for a memoir by Colonel Henry Yule
- Hugh Clifford, "Further India", in the Story of Exploration series (1904).
- John Keay, Mad About The Mekong ISBN 0-00-711115-0
- Thomazi, A., La conquête de l'Indochine (Paris, 1934)
