= Clovis Thorel =

French explorer and botanist (1833–1911)

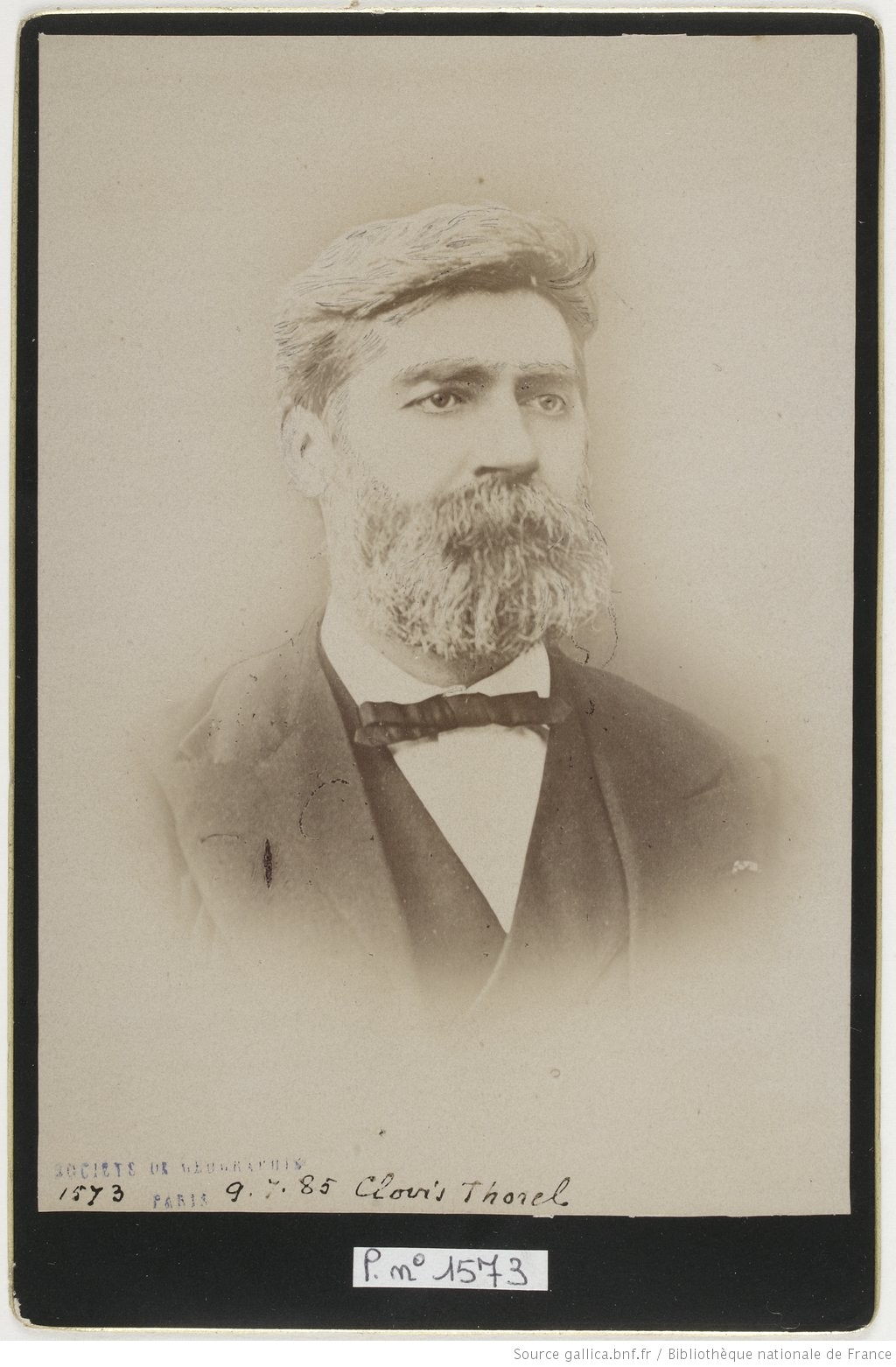
Clovis Thorel

Clovis Thorel, born April 28, 1833, in Hébécourt, Somme, France, died September 11, 1911, in Bagnoles-de-l'Orne, was a French botanist, explorer of Indochina and doctor. A significant number of plant species are named after him and he described 4,203 species himself.

== Biography ==
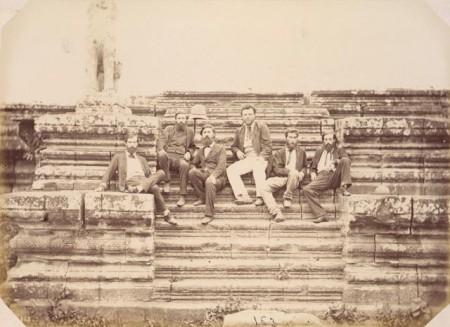
Mekong Exploration Commission (from right to left: Lieutenant Francis Garnier, Lieutenant Louis Delaporte, Clovis Thorel, Captain Ernest Doudart de Lagrée, Lucien Joubert, Louis de Carné) - photo Emile Gsel

Born in 1833 in Vers-Hébécourt, Thorel attended medical school from the age of 17, against the advice of his parents, modest textile workers who wanted him to continue their trade. He financed his studies by being a chemistry technician: becoming an associate then an intern of hospitals in Amiens. On the death of his mother, he enlisted as a third-class auxiliary surgeon in the Imperial Navy in 1861. He was immediately assigned to Cochinchina, where he worked at the Saigon hospital and devoted his leisure time to botany.

In 1866, he participated in the French Mekong expedition of 1866–1868 under the direction of the frigate captain Ernest Doudart de Lagrée. It aims were to carry out geographic and biological studies and to find a novel route to China: travelling up the Mekong River, visiting the temples of Angkor, crossing present-day Laos, then crossing Tonkin to reach Yunnan, via the high mountains. Captain de Lagrée died and the exhausted and sick survivors reached Shanghai in June 1868, having covered 8,800 km in two years.

In 1868, he was appointed knight of the Legion of Honour by Napoleon III. Upon his return to metropolitan France in 1870, he defended his doctoral thesis in medicine entitled Notes médicales du voyage d'exploration du Mékong. It lists the diseases observed in these countries and described exotic plants, such as "Glycosmis cochinchinensis" (synonym of Buchanania cochinchinensis), and their therapeutic properties. He wrote the ethnographic part of the report of the expedition, as well as the chapter devoted to agriculture and botany.

He left the Navy in 1871, when the French Third Republic was established, to open a medical office in the Passy district. Due to lack of finances, he gave up a project for publication of a flora of Indochina. In 1906, he donated his herbarium and nine manuscript volumes describing 4,203 species to the Museum National d'Histoire Naturelle in Paris.

The last twenty years of his life, he devoted himself to the study of the thermal properties of the great source of Bagnoles-de-l'Orne, where he died in 1911.

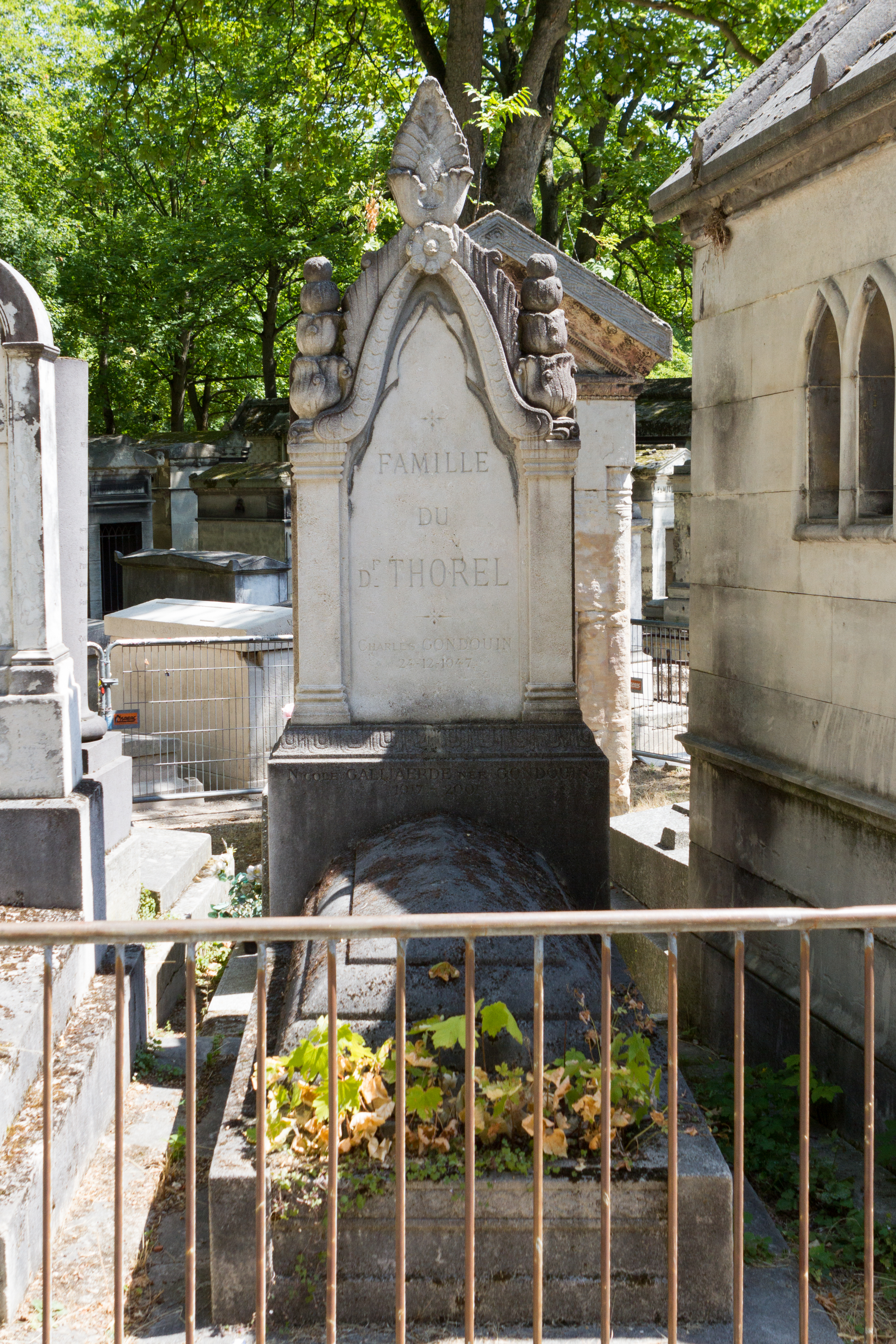
Grave in Père-Lachaise cemetery (6th division) 4.

The standard author abbreviation Thorel is used to indicate this person as the author when citing a botanical name.

== Honours ==
In 1908, botanist François Gagnepain published Neothorelia is a monotypic genus of flowering plants from Laos, belonging to the family Capparaceae and named in Thorel's honour.
