= Milton Osborne =

Australian historian

Milton Edgeworth Osborne, AM is an Australian historian, author, and consultant specializing in Southeast Asia.

== Education ==
Osborne attended North Sydney Boys High School, graduated from the University of Sydney and received his Doctor of Philosophy from Cornell University. At the University of Sydney in the 1950s, he studied history with Jill Ker Conway. At Cornell University, he studied Southeast Asian history with OW Wolters.

== Academic career ==
Osborne held academic positions in Australia, the United Kingdom, the United States and Singapore. Osborne's main historical contribution had been to synthesize the history of the region as a whole, rather than concentrate on the histories of the present-day nations.

Osborne's Southeast Asia association began in 1959 with an Australian diplomatic posting to Phnom Penh. In 1980 and 1981 Osborne advised the United Nations High Commissioner for Refugees on the Cambodian refugee problem. In 1982 he returned to Australia, working as Head of the Asia Branch of the Office of National Assessments, also serving for a year as Head of Current Intelligence.

Osborne now lives in Sydney and continues to write while consulting on Asian issues, as well as having been a series editor on the Short History of Asia Series published by Allen and Unwin.

== Honours ==
Osborne was appointed a Member of the Order of Australia in the 2021 Australia Day Honours for "significant service to history as an author."

== Books ==
- Singapore and Malaysia (1964)
- Strategic Hamlets in South Viet-Nam: A Survey and a Comparison (1965)
- The French Presence in Cochinchina and Cambodia: Rule and Response (1859–1905) (1969, reprinted 1997)
- Region of Revolt: Focus on Southeast Asia (1970)
- Politics and Power in Cambodia: The Sihanouk Years (Longman, 1973)
- River Road to China: The Mekong River Expedition, 1866–1873 (London and New York, 1975)
- Southeast Asia: An Introductory History (eleven editions, 1979–2013)
- Before Kampuchea: Preludes to Tragedy (1979)
- Sihanouk: Prince of Light, Prince of Darkness (1994)
- River Road to China: The Search for the Source of the Mekong, 1866–73 (1999), Atlantic Monthly Press ISBN 0-87113-752-6
- The Mekong: Turbulent Past, Uncertain Future, Allen & Unwin, Sydney (2000), ISBN 1-86508-219-8
- The paramount power: China and the countries of Southeast Asia (2006)
- Phnom Penh: A Cultural and Literary History (2008)
- Pol Pot Solved the Leprosy Problem (2018), Connor Court Publishing, Redland Bay, ISBN 9781925501803

== Articles ==
- "Francis Garnier (1839–1873), Explorer of the Mekong River", Explorers of South-east Asia, Six Lives, ed. Victor T. King, (Kuala Lumpur: OUP, 1995)
- River at risk: the Mekong and the water politics of China and Southeast Asia
