= Ernest Doudart de Lagrée =

French explorer

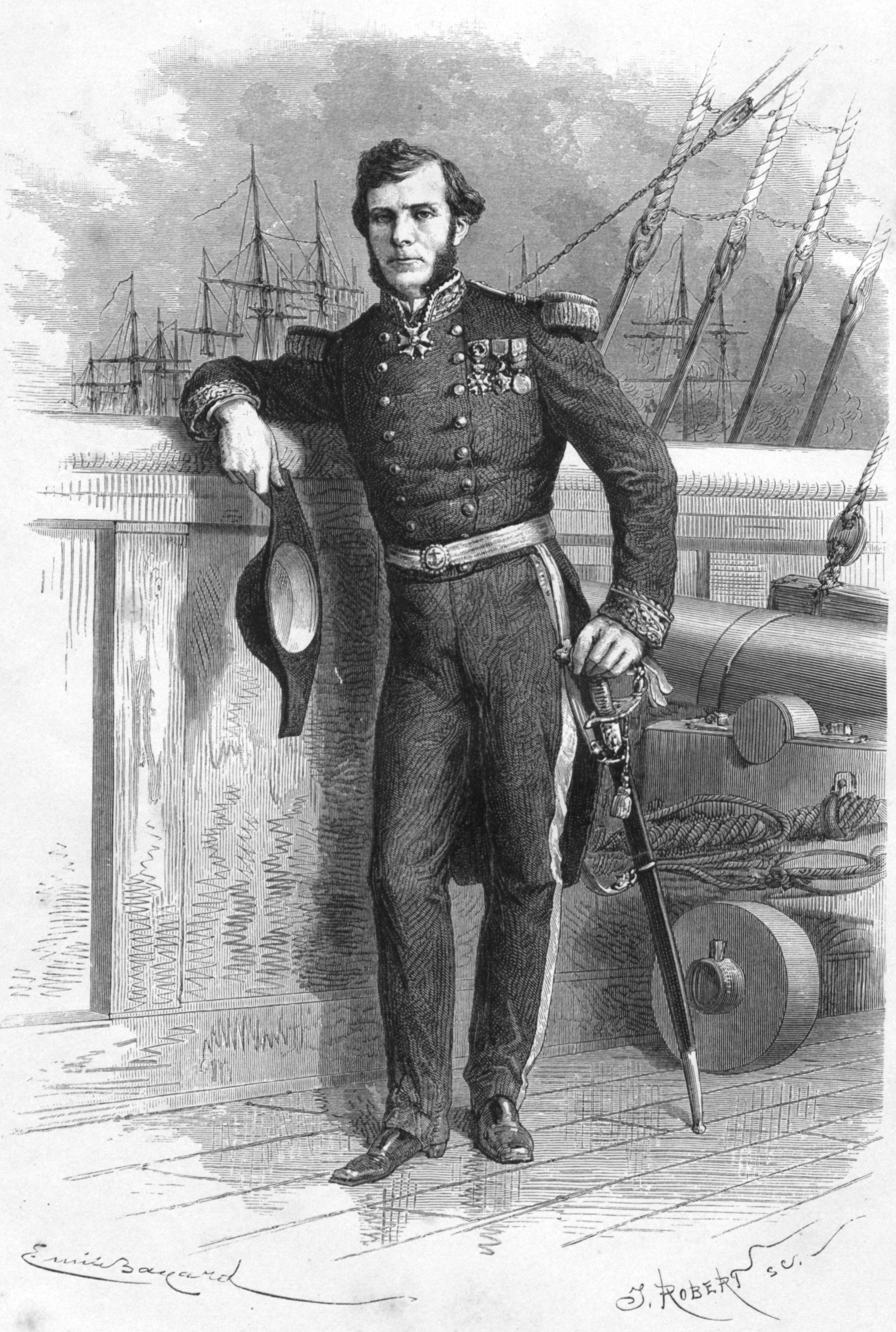
Ernest Doudart de Lagrée, from Voyage d'exploration en Indo-Chine

Ernest Marc Louis de Gonzague Doudart de Lagrée (French pronunciation: [ɛʁnɛst dudaʁ də laɡʁe]; 31 March 1823 – 12 March 1868) was the leader of the French Mekong Expedition of 1866-1868.

He was born in Saint-Vincent-de-Mercuze near Grenoble, France, and graduated from the École Polytechnique. He joined the French Navy and served in the Crimean War, then took up a post in Indochina in the hope that the climate would help his chronically ulcerated throat. It did not, and throughout the Mekong expedition he was often in severe pain.

The expedition left Saigon on 5 June 1866. In addition to his ulcers, Doudart de Lagrée suffered from fever, amoebic dysentery and infected wounds caused by leeches, as the expeditioners had to walk barefoot once they had worn out their supply of shoes. By the time the expedition reached Dongchuan, in Yunnan, China, he was too sick to be moved, and his second-in-command Francis Garnier took command. Garnier led the expedition to Dali, leaving Doudart de Lagrée in the care of the doctor. He died from an abscess on his liver. The doctor removed his heart to return it to France, while Doudart de Lagrée was buried in Dongchuan.

Ernest Doudart de Lagrée was also an entomologist. Insect collections made by him in Africa are conserved in Muséum national d'histoire naturelle in Paris.

== Honours ==
- Three ships of the French Navy were named in his honour, notably the Doudart de Lagrée (F 728)
- Three stamps of French Indochina were issued in his honour in 1944–45, in the values of 1, 15 and 40 centimes.
