= Flag of the Republic of Formosa =

National flag and emblem (1895)

National Flag of the Republic of Formosa
- Yellow Tiger Flag
- Use: National flag and ensign
- Adopted: May 23, 1895
- Design: Blue background with yellow Tiger pattern in the center and eyes with wide pupils.
- Design: In reverse form, the tiger's eye pupils are half-open like a crescent moon.

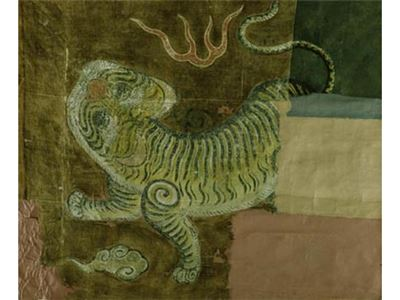
A picture book of the Yellow Tiger Flag from the National Taiwan Museum.

The National Flag of the Republic of Formosa was used as flag and emblem of the Republic of Formosa, which was founded in Taiwan and existed from May 23 until October 1895. Due to its design of a blue ground and a yellow tiger, it was also called the Blue Ground Yellow Tiger Flag, or simply the Yellow Tiger Flag. On the same day the flag debuted, Tang Jingsong (唐景崧) announced the "Declaration of Independence of the Republic of Formosa".

== History ==
The first "Blue Ground Yellow Tiger Flag" appeared on May 23, 1895, when the Republic of Formosa was established. When Taiwan and the Penghu Islands were ceded to Japan as a result of the Treaty of Maguan (馬關條約), the Republic of Formosa was founded to avoid the fate of cession. Tang Jingsong, the then-governor of Taiwan Province, was chosen as the first president. Soon after, when the Japanese forces captured Keelung, Tang Jingsong first fled to Douglas Lapraik & Co. in Huwei (now Tamsui), then he took the German steamship Arthur and further escaped to Xiamen. In late June, the remainder of the republic chose Grand General Liu Yongfu (劉永福) as the second President of the Republic of Formosa. In October, 1895, the Republic of Formosa was dissolved after President Liu was defeated in battle and retreated back to China.

The Blue Ground Yellow Tiger Flag was designed to mimic the Qing Empire's Yellow Ground Blue Dragon Flag, and the design earned its namesake the Blue Ground Yellow Tiger Flag. According to article 4 of the Provisional Constitution of the Republic of Formosa, it "uses the Blue Ground Yellow Tiger Flag, which also serves as the national emblem".

In 2012, after conducting a year and a half of research and repair, the National Taiwan Museum confirmed that the Yellow Tiger Flag was originally a double-sided design. The tiger's eye on the front and back were different from each other: On the front, the pupil of the Yellow Tiger was wide open, symbolizing that the tiger was nocturnal. On the back, the Yellow Tiger's pupil was half-open like a crescent, symbolizing that the tiger was diurnal. The two opposite sides represented the duality of day and night, or yin and yang, and a theory suggested the indication that the Tiger "protects the country day and night".

== The existing flag ==
This national flag was at least hanged at three locations in the format of large military flag: The "Keelung Flag" was in Keelung, the "Tamsui Flag" was in the Tamsui Customs, and the "Taipei Flag" was in the Republic of Formosa's Presidential Palace (now the Grand Matsu Temple in Tainan). All three flags were eventually lost, and it was only known that one of them was presented by the Japanese to the imperial palace as booty, but its present whereabouts was still unclear.

=== Takahashi Untei's version ===
In 1909, the Government-General of Taiwan gained approval from the Ministry of the Imperial Household and entrusted Japanese painter Takahashi Untei to replicate the "Keelung Flag" stored in Shintenhu (an imperial storage of booties). The copy was completed in the same year and returned to the Government-General of Taiwan Museum as an important exhibit substitution. Takahashi deliberately made the copy a faithful recreation of the original item, to the point that details of wear and damage were also reconstructed, making the copy most resembling the original. Although it was not the original item, it still possessed immense historical value. This copy became Taiwan's oldest existing copy that closely resembled the original flag and thereby a more authoritative version. The dimensions are roughly 3.1 and 2.6 meters, and it was held in the National Taiwan Museum.

Since 2003, the National Taiwan Museum began to plan a maintenance for the Takahashi Untei copy and asked Assistant Professor Hsu Peixian at National Hsinchu Normal University to conduct relevant research. Then, in 2010, the maintenance was entrusted to Tainan National University of the Arts, which was completed in 2011. On March 10, 2016, the Takahashi Untei Yellow Tiger Flag Copy was approved by the Ministry of Culture to be designated a national treasure by the Cultural Heritage Preservation Act.

=== Lin Yushan's version ===
In 1953, to commemorate the 59th anniversary of the founding of the Republic of Formosa, Qiu Niantai, son of Qiu Fengjia, invited Lin Yushan to create a new duplication of the flag based on the 1909 Takahashi Untei Yellow Tiger Flag copy. It was also stored in the National Taiwan Museum after its completion. This work, due to its complete image, became the most circulated version among the people. The damaged flag tail was amended, and the background color was made blue according to documents.

=== Digital reconstruction ===
To evoke people's memory of national treasure and help Taiwanese people understand more about one of the most valuable historical relics in Taiwan history, the National Taiwan Museum cooperated with EasyCard Corporation in 2016 to recreate three different versions of the Blue Ground Yellow Tiger Flag that appeared at three essential historical timings, which were the 1909 "Takahashi Untei copy", the 1953 "Lin Yushan modified version", and the previously undisclosed 1895 "digital reconstruction version". The digital reconstruction was a digitally simulated version of the Yellow Tiger Flag that was supposedly raised in Northern Taiwan when the Republic of Formosa was founded in 1895. Research comparison showed that from the flag's blue chroma to the Yellow Tiger image on the flag, this version resembled more closely to the original Yellow Tiger Flag upon its creation. This was also the first national treasure that appeared on an EasyCard, therefore carrying a special meaning.

== See also ==
- Republic of Formosa
- Flag of Taiwan
- President of the Republic of China
