= Jacques Duchesne =

French military officer

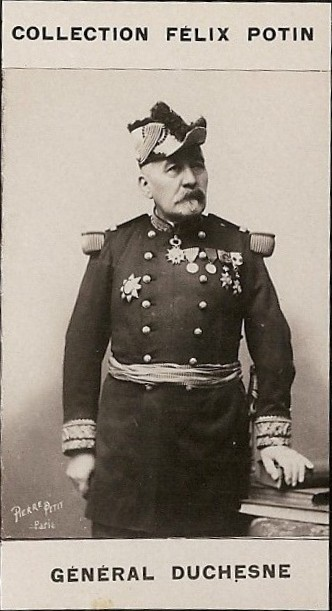
- General Jacques Duchesne (1837–1918)
- Born: 3 March 1837; Sens, France
- Died: 27 April 1918 (aged 81)
- Allegiance: France
- Branch: French Army
- Rank: General
- Conflicts: Siege of Tuyên Quang; Sino-French War; Second Franco-Hova War

General Jacques Charles René Achille Duchesne (3 March 1837 – 27 April 1918) was a 19th-century French military officer. He was born at Sens and entered Saint-Cyr in 1855, aged 18, and became a lieutenant in 1861.

== Career ==
Duchesne fought in the Franco-Prussian War in 1870–1871. He became a lieutenant-colonel in 1881.

=== Tonkin and Formosa ===
In 1884–85, during the Sino-French War, Lieutenant-Colonel Duchesne participated in campaigns in Tonkin (northern Vietnam) and Formosa (Taiwan). On 12 March 1884, during the Bắc Ninh Campaign, Duchesne was placed by General François de Négrier in command of the 2nd Brigade's attack on the forward defences of Bắc Ninh and led a successful charge into the Chinese-held village of Keroi.

In November 1884 Duchesne led a column of legionnaires, marine infantry and Tonkinese riflemen to relieve the Siege of Tuyên Quang, defeating Liu Yongfu's Black Flag Army at the Battle of Yu Oc (on 19 November 1884). In December 1884 he was appointed to the command of the Formosa expeditionary corps at Keelung in northern Taiwan. In January 1885 he assaulted the Chinese lines of investment around Keelung, capturing the advanced Chinese position of Fork Y. In March 1885 he launched a full-scale offensive against the Chinese lines at Keelung, making a flank march to attack the Chinese defences on their exposed eastern flank. The French offensive was completely successful. Duchesne's men captured the key Chinese positions of La Table and Fort Bamboo on 5 March and 7 March, respectively, forcing the Chinese to retreat to new positions south of the Keelung River.

=== Franco-Hova war ===
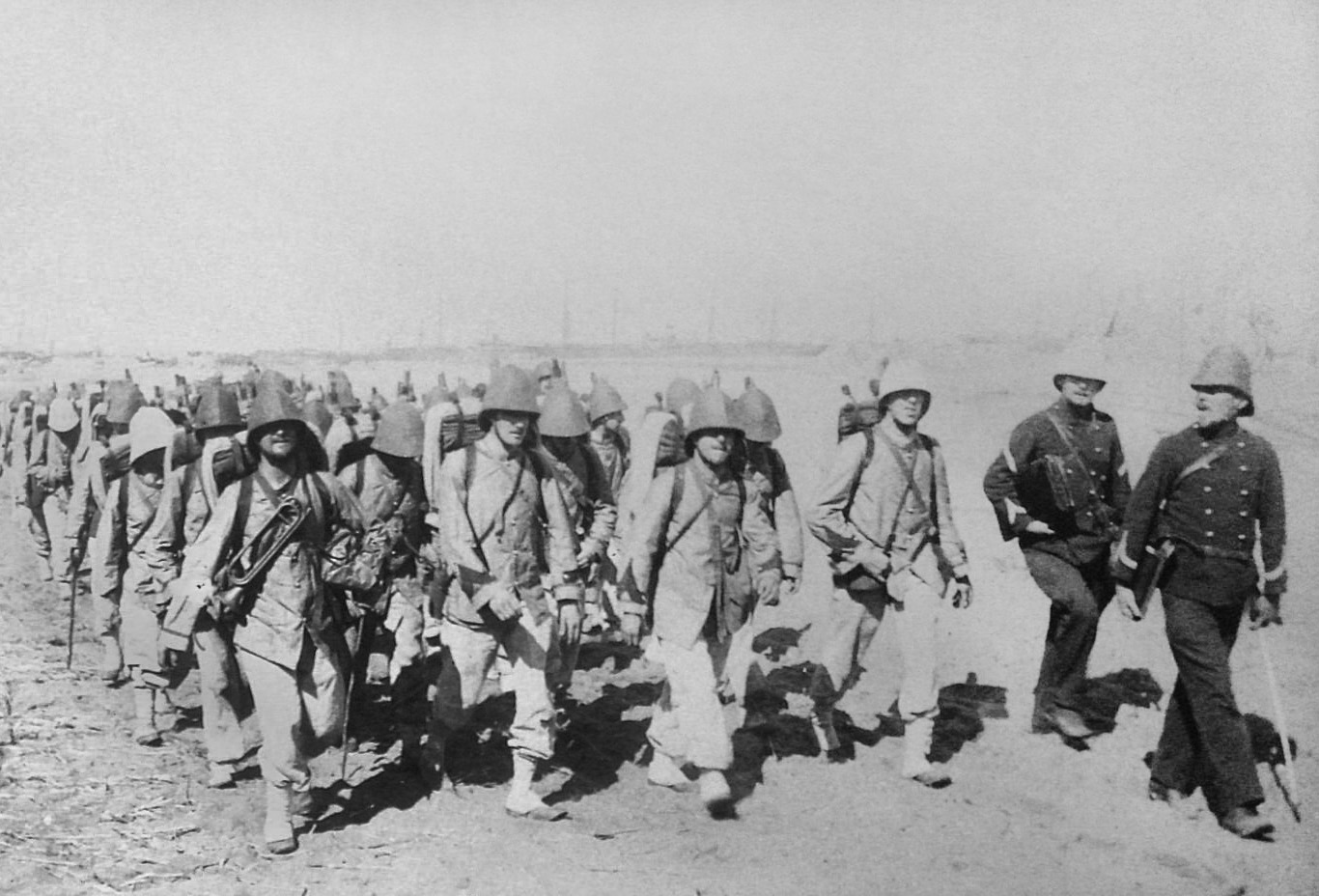
Landing of part of the French troops under Jacques Duchesne, the 40th Bataillon de Chasseurs à Pied in Majunga, between 5 May and 24 May 1895.

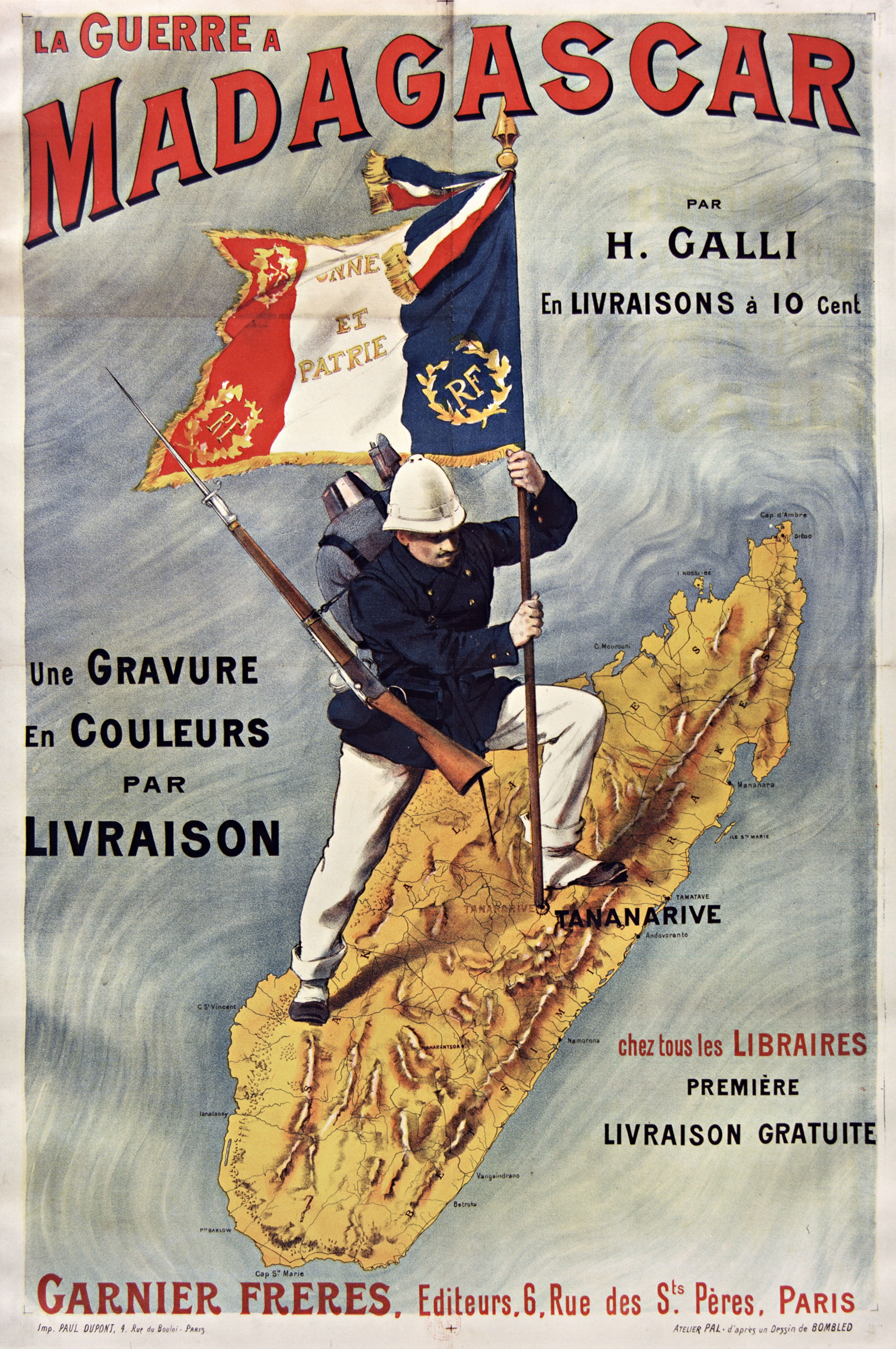
Duchesne was called the "Conqueror of Madagascar"

In 1895, Duchesne led the French invasion of Madagascar in the Second Franco-Hova War, disembarking his 15,000 troops at Majunga, and managing to capture Tananarive after seven months. Twenty French soldiers died fighting and 6,000 died of malaria and other diseases before the Second Franco-Hova War ended. The government signed a treaty that yielded significant powers to the French authorities but left the monarchy intact. Madagascar became a French protectorate.
