= Battle of Yu Oc =

Battle during the Sino-French War

- Part of the Sino-French War, Tonkin Campaign
Date	19 November 1884
Location	south of Tuyên Quang, northern Vietnam 21°49′00″N 105°13′00″E
Result	French victory

Belligerents
France	Black Flag Army

Commanders and leaders
(French Third Republic) Jacques Duchesne	Liu Yongfu

Strength
700 men	Around 2,000 men

Casualties and losses
10 dead 37 wounded	Several hundreds casualties
- Location within Vietnam Battle of Yu Oc (Southeast Asia)

The Battle of Yu Oc (19 November 1884) was a French victory during the Sino-French War. The battle was fought to relieve the French garrison of Tuyên Quang, under siege by the Tang Jingsong's Yunnan Army and Liu Yongfu's Black Flag Army. The French commander at Yu Oc, Colonel Jacques Duchesne, would later distinguish himself as the conqueror of Madagascar (1895).

== Background ==
The French installed a post at Tuyên Quang in June 1884, in the wake of their capture of Hưng Hóa and Thái Nguyên. Tuyên Quang, an isolated settlement on the Clear River, was the most westerly French outpost in Tonkin, and was more than 100 kilometres (62 mi) away from the French garrisons in Hưng Hóa and Thái Nguyên. During the summer and autumn of 1884 the post was garrisoned by two companies of the 1st Battalion, 1st Foreign Legion Regiment (Captains Chmitelin and Broussier), under the command of chef de bataillon Frauger.

The outbreak of the Sino-French War on 23 August 1884 exposed the post to attack by Tang Jingsong's Yunnan Army and Liu Yongfu’s Black Flag Army. Supply difficulties delayed the Chinese concentration around Tuyen Quang, but advance elements of the Yunnan Army began to harass the post on 12 October 1884, and Frauger's garrison had to fight off a number of nuisance attacks by the Chinese between 13 and 19 October. Malaria had also taken a heavy toll of Frauger's men, and by the end of October 170 men out of the garrison's total strength of 550 men were unfit for duty.

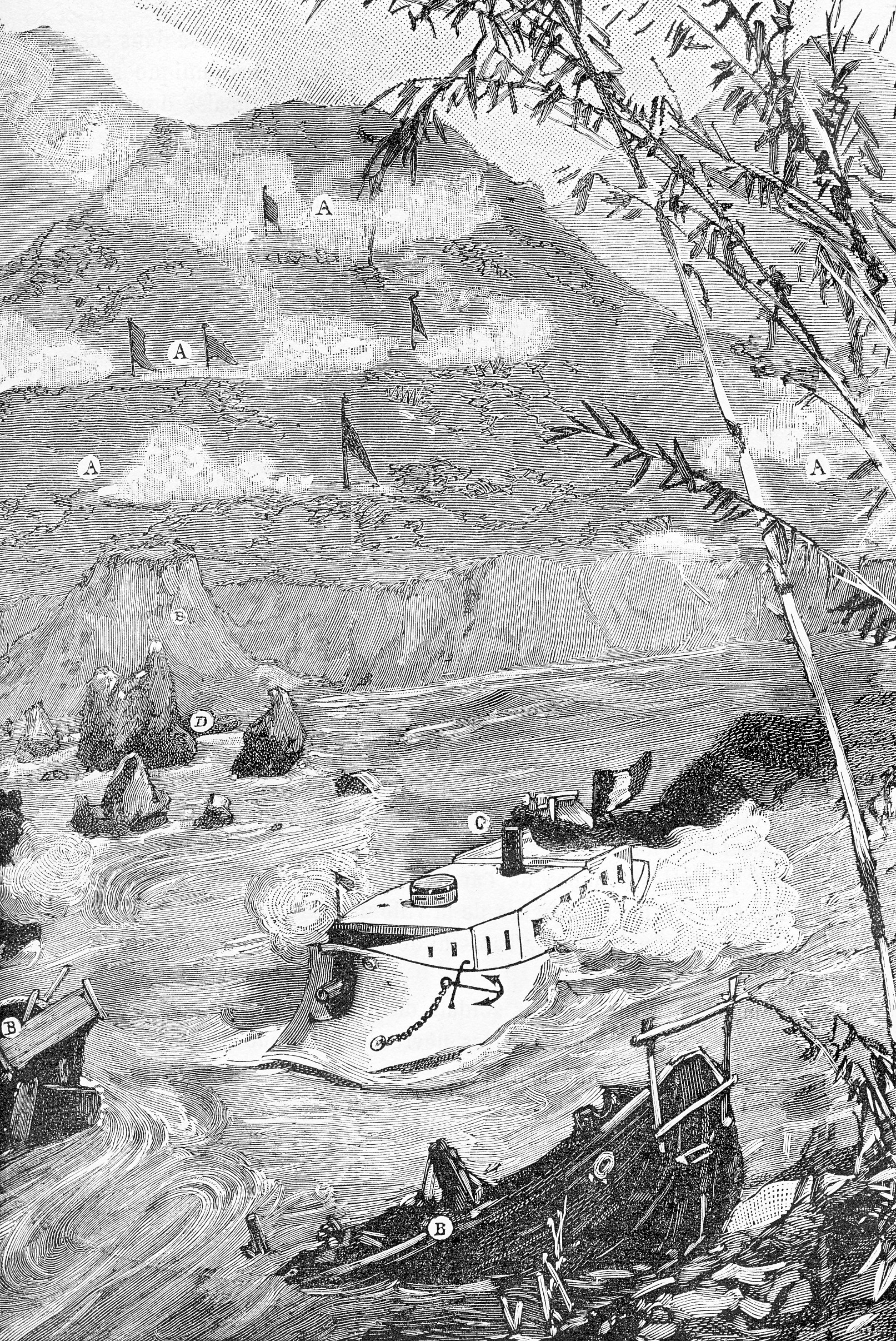
Revolver runs the gauntlet of the Chinese defences at Yu Oc, October 1884

During October and November 1884 the Farcy gunboats Revolver and Mitrailleuse, based at Tuyen Quang, and the gunboats Bourrasque, Éclair, Mutine and Trombe, operating out of Hưng Hóa, mounted a number of dangerous supply runs along the Clear River between Hung Hoa and Tuyen Quang in support of the small French garrison at Tuyen Quang. The first supply run, made by Revolver and Mitrailleuse on 15 October 1884, was successful, but at the end of October the Black Flags occupied Yu Oc, cutting off Tuyên Quang by land from the nearest French post at Hung Hoa and also commanding the river route to Tuyên Quang. A few days earlier the gunboat Mutine had been ordered to reinforce Revolver and Mitrailleuse at Tuyên Quang, but she ran aground during her voyage up the Clear River and Éclair had to be sent to pull her off and tow her back to Hung Hoa.

During the first half of November the French suffered a constant dribble of casualties as their gunboats sailing up and down the Clear River were engaged by the Black Flags at Yu Oc. In an engagement on 12 November Trombe suffered casualties of 1 man dead and 7 wounded. On one occasion Revolver had to steam at full speed to break a barrage laid across the Clear River, and on 16 November her crew sustained casualties of 2 men dead and 3 wounded (including the commander, enseigne de vaisseau de Balincourt) from enemy fire from Yu Oc.

The commander of the Tonkin Expeditionary Corps General Louis Brière de l'Isle, reacted swiftly to the attack on Revolver on 16 November. Foreseeing further such attacks, he decided to despatch an expedition immediately to clear the Black Flags away from Yu Oc. At the same time, a food convoy would leave by water by resupply and relieve the garrison of Tuyên Quang. A column of five infantry companies with supporting artillery was formed at Hung Hoa under the command of Lieutenant-Colonel Jacques Duchesne. (Note: Duchesne’s column consisted of the 3rd and 4th Companies, 1st Foreign Legion Battalion (Captains de Borelli and Moulinay), the 25th and 28th Companies, 1st Marine Infantry Regiment (Captains Chanu and Herbin), the 8th Company, 1st Tonkinese Rifle Regiment (Captain Dia) and Lieutenant Derappe’s section of Vintemberger’s battery. Chef de bataillon Bouguié and Captain Cattelin were in overall command of the two marine infantry companies and the two Legion companies respectively.)

Duchesne's column set out for Tuyên Quang on the morning of 18 November. The French troops were ferried aboard a flotilla of junks, escorted by the four gunboats based at Hưng Hóa, to a point 7 kilometres (4.3 mi) above Yu Oc. The troops went ashore on the afternoon of 18 November on the right bank of the Clear River, and began marching slowly, in single file, towards Yu Oc and Tuyên Quang. By the evening of 18 November the column was within a few hours' march of Yu Oc. No sign of the enemy had yet been seen.

== The battle of Yu Oc, 19 November 1884 ==
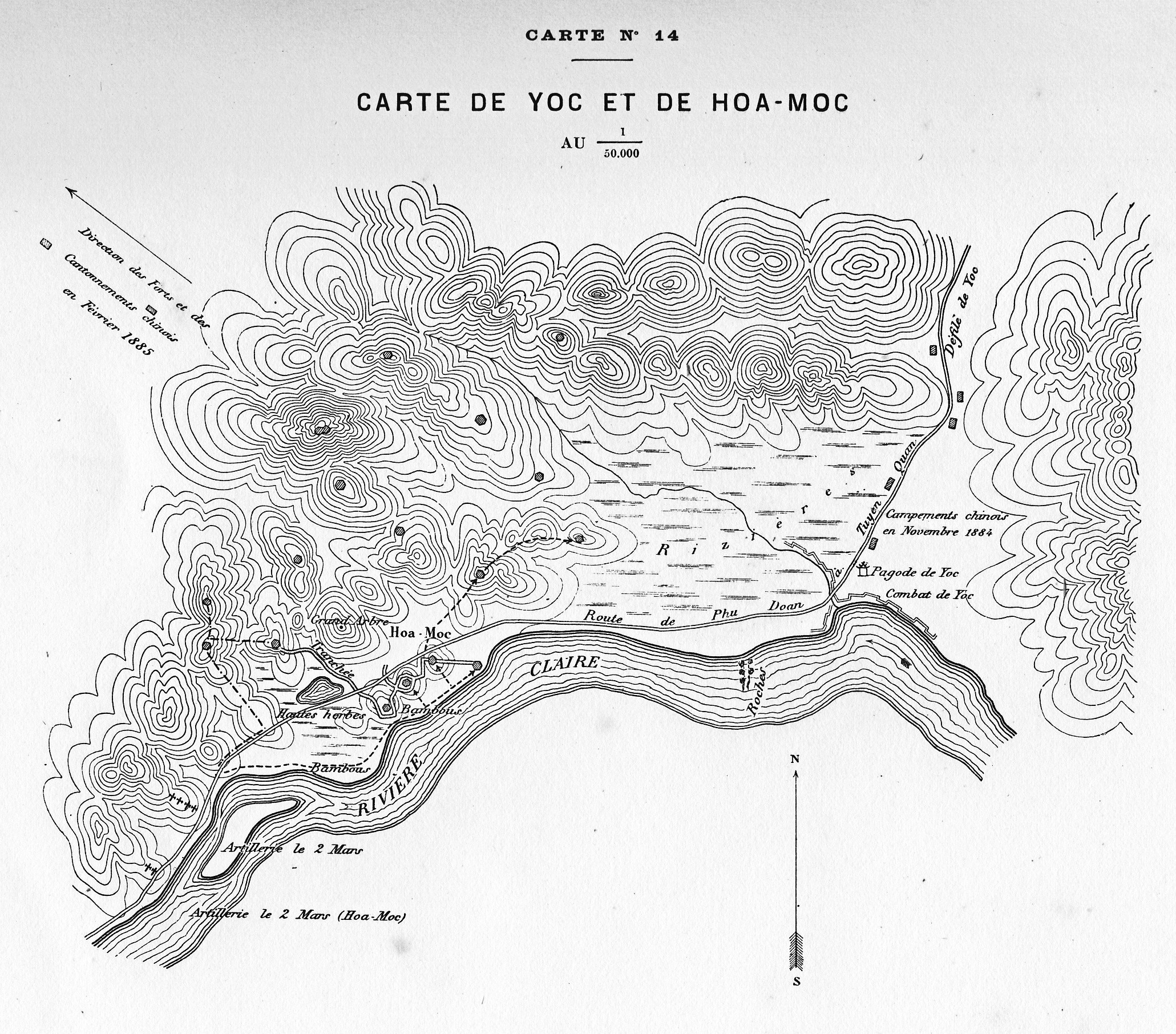
Map of the Battle of Yu Oc, 19 November 1884

At dawn on 19 November the column set out for Yu Oc. Herbin and Chanu's marine infantry companies led the way. The artillery followed and the two Legion companies brought up the rear. The marsouins advanced in silence, but they knew that the Chinese were aware of their march. At around 7:00 am three shots were fired at the head of the column. The Chinese scouts were warning their comrades that the French were coming. The marine infantry continued to advance, waiting for the Chinese to show themselves. Minutes later the advance guard came under fire from three sides from Chinese skirmishers. The Chinese were deployed across the path, in the woods to its west, and on the further bank of the Clear River.

Duchesne ordered the two marine infantry companies to make a frontal attack on the Chinese blocking position, while de Borelli's Legion company simultaneously attacked the enemy's right flank. The three companies deployed, and after taking the Chinese position under a crossfire, de Borelli's legionnaires charged and overran the Chinese front line. Lieutenant Goeury and two men of his platoon were wounded in this assault. The Chinese fled, unmasking 300 metres (980 ft) to the rear a fortified position of considerable strength, in the middle of which a large tree could be seen.

The marine infantry tried to push on towards the main Chinese position, but all their efforts to advance further were checked by a heavy weight of fire. For more than two hours they remained pinned down in front of the Black Flag lines, under fire from both their front and from skirmishers on the eastern bank of the river. As the marsouins exchanged shots with their tormentors, losses began to mount in their ranks. One officer, Lieutenant Schuster, was killed. Derappe's guns did their best to support them, splitting their fire between the Chinese fort and the enemy skirmishers across the river. Eventually both the infantry and the gunners began to run short of ammunition, and there was no sign of the gunboats of the flotilla.

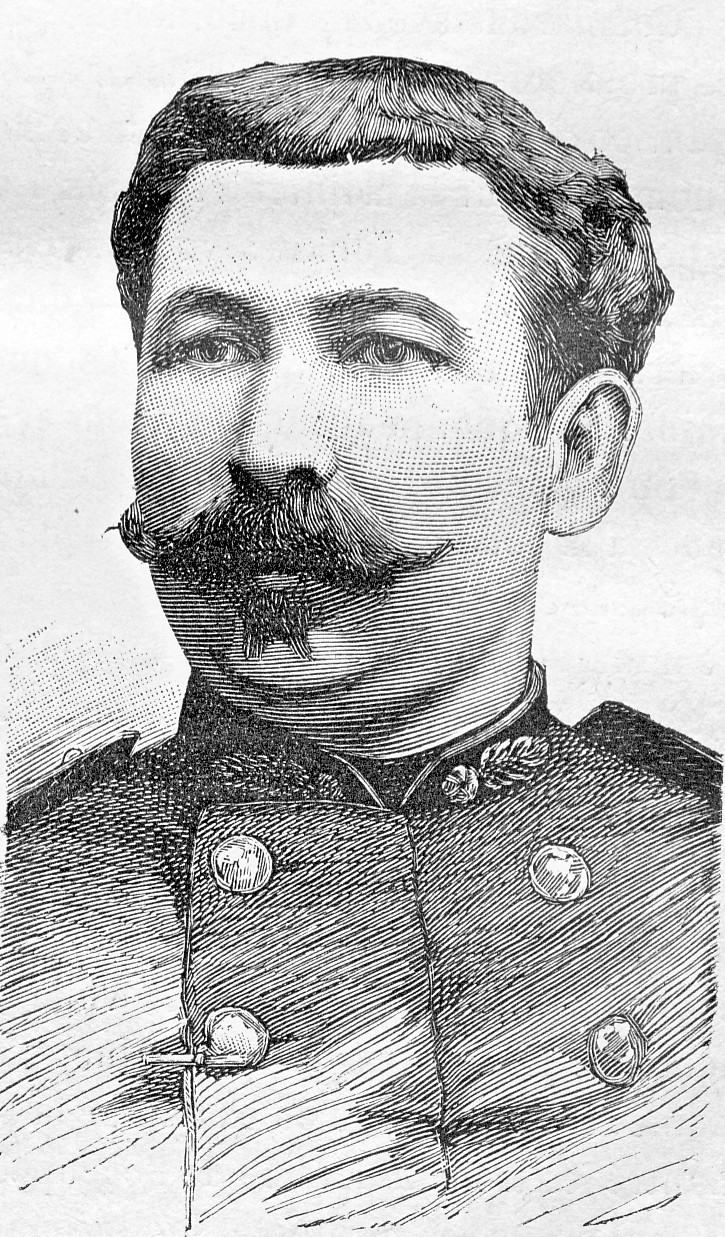
Lieutenant Goeury of the French Foreign Legion, wounded at Yu Oc on 19 November 1884

However, help was on its way. While Chanu and Herbin's companies were engaging the enemy frontally, de Borelli's Legion company had once again marched round the Chinese flank. At 10:00 am, just as the marsouins were down to their last few rounds, the legionnaires emerged from the forest to the west of the Chinese position, threatening the Chinese line of retreat. The Chinese immediately abandoned their positions and fell back towards Yu Oc, leaving behind several flags and ammunition boxes.

Duchesne pressed on, with de Borelli's legionnaires leading the way. Ten minutes later the column reached a deep and nearly vertical ravine, with a Chinese fort on the other side. The Chinese in the fort opened fire at the French vanguard, and de Borelli ordered his weary men to fix bayonets and charge. The legionnaires scrambled down the ravine and up the other side, without returning fire. The Chinese abandoned their defences before the French could close with them, and disappeared into the forests of Yu Oc. De Borelli and Chanu pushed forward to the Yu Oc pagoda and deployed their companies to form a defensive screen, while Herbin and Moulinay's men set fire to the Chinese barracks and destroyed part of their works.

It was still only 10:30 am, and the column had already been in action twice. Duchesne now halted his men to allow them to regroup, eat an early lunch and replenish their ammunition. The French buried their dead and the gunboat Éclair, which had finally linked up with the column, took the wounded on board and ferried them up to Tuyen Quang. An hour later the march resumed. At 3:30 pm the column entered the Yu Oc defile, whose exit towards Tuyen Quang was blocked by two fortlets and by a series of trenches. Abattis nearly 300 metres (980 ft) deep covered the path. A force coming from Tuyen Quang could not have crossed this pass. Around 7:00 pm the advance guard approached the citadel. Guessing that the sentries in the besieged fortress would be nervous, the buglers played the first few bars of Le Boudin, the famous Legion refrain, to which the troops in Tuyên Quang replied. A scouting party coming from the fortress carried lanterns, to facilitate the crossing of the last stream.

French casualties in the engagement at Yu Oc were 10 dead and 37 wounded, mostly among the marine infantry. (Note: Losses in the two marine infantry companies were 9 men killed (including one officer, 2nd Lieutenant Schuster) and 30 wounded. Losses in the two Legion companies were 1 man killed and 7 wounded (including two officers, Lieutenants Goeury and Vincent).) Chinese and Black Flag casualties are unknown, but were certainly higher than the French casualties.

== Aftermath ==
On 20 November, under the protection of Éclair, the convoy reached Tuyên Quang. The other gunboats remained at Yu Oc. On the same day Duchesne, who for the moment had an entire Legion battalion under his command, sent out strong reconnaissances to clear the Black Flags from the immediate environs of Tuyên Quang. He himself advanced on Truong Mu and pushed the Black Flags back towards Phu An Binh, while Captain Chmitelin, under the protection of Éclair's cannon, went to destroy the Chinese positions near Tuyên Quang on the left bank of the Clear River. On 21 and 22 November Duchesne advanced northwest and burned the village of Dong Dien, which had been used as a camp by the Black Flags. The Black Flags evacuated the village on his approach, and made no attempt to dispute the French advance. On the evening of 22 November Duchesne returned to Tuyên Quang.

Duchesne's column left Tuyên Quang on 23 November to return to Son Tay. During the return march Duchesne established a French post at Phu Doan on the Clear River, 80 kilometres (50 mi) to the south of Tuyên Quang, leaving a company of marine infantry there as a garrison.

Duchesne took with him the two Legion companies of the original garrison of Tuyên Quang, leaving chef de bataillon Marc-Edmond Dominé behind as the new post commander with de Borelli and Moulinay's Legion companies, Dia's Tonkinese, Derappe's artillery section, Bobillot's engineers and a small medical and administrative staff. The gunboat Revolver had left earlier, but Mitrailleuse remained at her station on the Clear River beyond the post's walls. The garrison of Tuyên Quang now consisted of just over 630 men, with food and provisions for 120 days, but had only 200 shells.

The Farcy gunboat Revolver was also withdrawn from Tuyên Quang, but Mitrailleuse remained on station, and later distinguished herself in the Siege of Tuyên Quang.

On 24 November, the day after Duchesne's departure, Dominé declared Tuyên Quang to be in a state of siege. The battle of Yu Oc was merely the precursor to the four-month Siege of Tuyên Quang (24 November 1884 – 3 March 1885).

== Order of the day ==
On 24 November 1884 General Brière de l'Isle issued the following order of the day to commemorate the victory at Yu Oc:

Le général commandant le corps expéditionnaire est heureux de porter à la connaissance des troupes les brillants succès remportés par M. le colonel Duchesne sur les Pavillons-Noirs et les Réguliers du Yun-Nan concentrés et fortement retranchés sur la rive droite de la rivière Claire, dans la région sud de Tuyen-Quan. Le 19 novembre, à Yu-oc, après quatre heures d’une lutte opiniâtre, l’ennemi était mis en pleine déroute et fuyait dans la direction de l’ouest. Le 20, la colonne, sortant de Tuyen-Quan, détruisait tous les retranchements élevés par les Chinois dans les villages environnants et brûlait leurs approvisionnements. L’ennemi est poursuivi la baïonnette dans les reins. La cannonnière l’Éclair a pris une part active aux deux opérations. Nos pertes sont de huit tués, dont M. le sous-lieutenant Schuster, de l’infanterie de marine, et vingt-cinq blessés, dont M. Gœury, lieutenant à la légion étrangère.

(The general officer commanding the expeditionary corps is delighted to inform units of the splendid successes gained by Colonel Duchesne over the Black Flags and the Yunnan regulars concentrated and strongly entrenched on the right bank of the Clear River, in the region to the south of Tuyên Quang. On 19 November, at Yu Oc, after a stubborn action lasting four hours, the enemy was routed and fled towards the west. On 20 November the column left Tuyên Quang, destroyed all the earthworks thrown up by the Chinese in the neighbouring villages, and burned their equipment. The enemy was pursued with the bayonet in his guts. The gunboat Éclair played an active part in these two operations. Our losses were 8 men killed, including 2nd Lieutenant Schuster of the marine infantry, and 25 men wounded, including Lieutenant Goeury of the Foreign Legion.)

Most French orders of the day during the Sino-French War recorded French casualties with scrupulous accuracy. This particular order slightly understates the French casualties at Yu Oc.
