= Qiu Fengjia =

Taiwanese politician during the Qing dynasty

Qiu Fengjia

Qiu Fengjia (Chinese: 丘逢甲; pinyin: Qiū Féngjiǎ; Wade–Giles: Ch'iu Feng-chia; Pha̍k-fa-sṳ: Hiû Fùng-kap; 26 December 1864 – 25 February 1912) was a Taiwanese-born Chinese politician, educator, and poet. He was of ethnic Hakka descent.

== History ==
Qiu was born in Aulang Town (Chinese: 後壟堡), Tamsui Ting, Taiwan Prefecture, Fujian (modern Tongluo, Miaoli County, Taiwan) with ancestry from Jiaoling, Guangdong, in 1864, during Qing rule. He had a son Chiu Nian-tai, whose given name meant "remember Taiwan", and two grandchildren, Chiu Ying-Nan and Chiu Ying-Tang (丘應棠).

Qiu advocated and organized the setting up of militia forces in Taiwan and sold his property assets for the cause. By 1894, there were 140 camps of militia forces totaling 100,000 men in Taiwan. Following the Qing dynasty's cession of Formosa (Taiwan) and the Pescadores to Japan in April 1895 at the end of the First Sino-Japanese War, the Republic of Formosa was formed. Tang Jingsong, the Qing governor of Taiwan, was appointed as President, with Qiu as Vice-President and Liu Yongfu as commander of the armed forces, while Wu Tangxing was appointed commander of the civilian militia at Qiu's recommendation.

Tang was suspicious of Liu Yongfu who had won fame as a Chinese patriot fighting against the French in northern Vietnam (Tonkin) in the 1870s and early 1880s. Liu was sent to defend Tainan in southern Taiwan. The Japanese attacked Keelung in northern Taiwan and easily defeated Tang's ill-disciplined forces. Tang quickly fled Taiwan after the defeat. Qiu led the militia forces to continue the fighting but was advised by his father to leave Taiwan so that he could make a comeback another time. The militia forces, including women in its ranks, continued the resistance for few months, and inflicted fewer deaths on the invading Japanese army. This figure was many times higher than the losses in the First Sino-Japanese War against the Japanese forces.

Qiu was later involved in Xinhai revolution and was Guangdong Representative for the Republic of China Provisional Presidential Election in 1911. He later became a member of the government of Sun Yat-sen.

Feng Chia University in Taichung, Taiwan is named in honor of him.
