= Ying-Nan Chiu =

Taiwanese chemist (1933–2009)

Ying-Nan Chiu (Chinese: 丘應楠; 1933–2009) was a Taiwanese chemist.

Chiu's father Chiu Nian-tai and grandfather Chiu Feng-chia left Taiwan upon the collapse of the Republic of Formosa. Ying-Nan Chiu was educated in the United States, earning his bachelor's degree at Berea College in 1955, followed by a master's degree in 1956 and doctorate in 1960, both from Yale University. Chiu conducted postdoctoral research at Columbia University until 1962, then moved to the University of Chicago. He joined The Catholic University of America as an assistant professor in 1964, and spent the rest of his career there, advancing to an associate professorship in 1966, a full professorship in 1970, serving as chair of the chemistry department from 1972 to 1981, and retiring with emeritus status in 2001.

Chiu was elected a fellow of the American Physical Society and a member of Academia Sinica in 1986.

Ying-Nan Chiu was married to Lue Yung Chow. He died in Silver Spring, Maryland, on 18 July 2009, aged 77.
