= Battle of Palan =

- Part of the Tonkin campaign
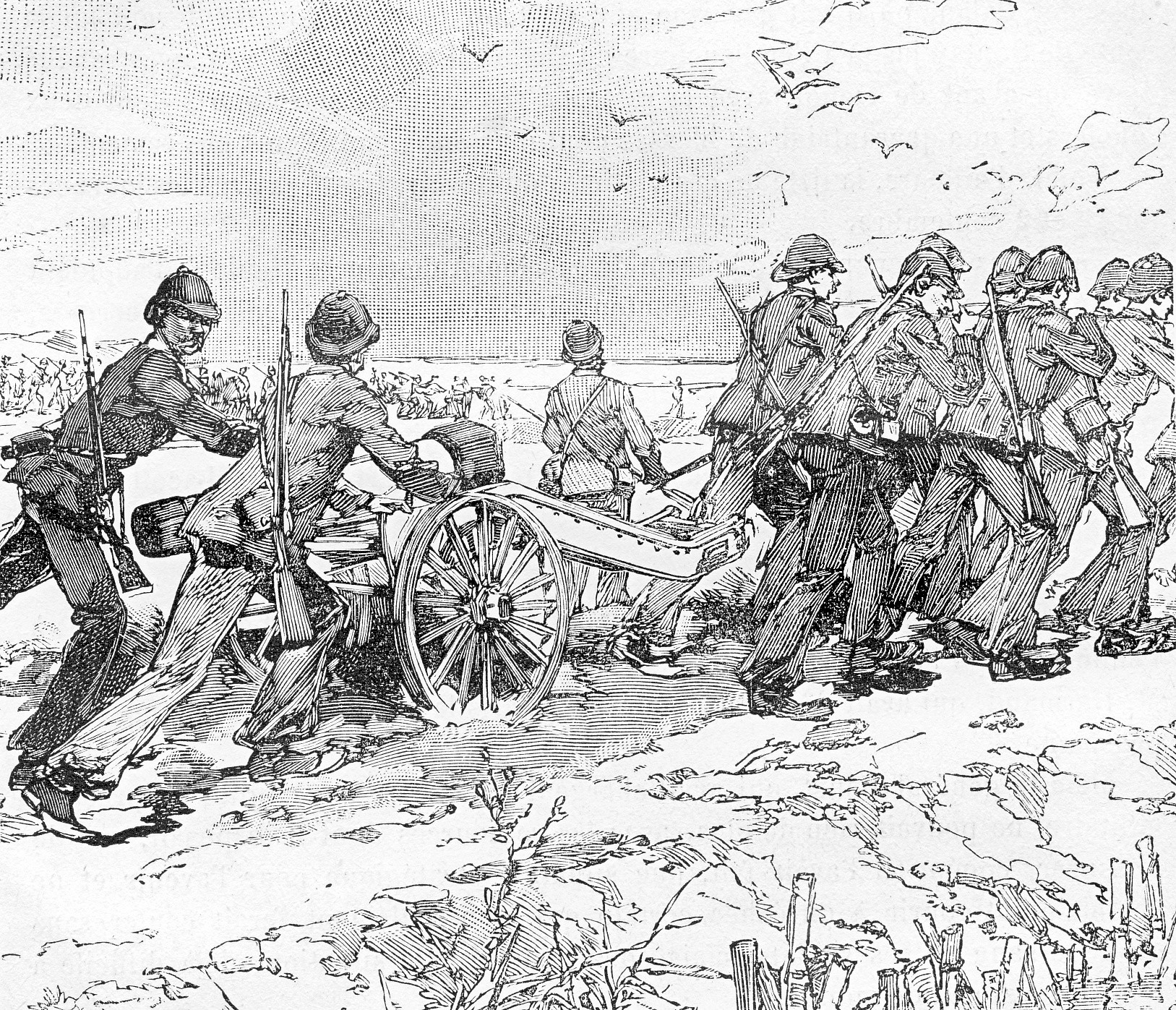
- French artillerymen at Palan bring up their guns
Date	1 September 1883
Location	near Hanoi, Northern Vietnam
Result	French tactical victory, strategically inconclusive

Belligerents
(French Third Republic) French Colonial Empire	Black Flag Army; Nguyễn dynasty

Commanders and leaders
(French Third Republic) Alexandre-Eugène Bouët	Liu Yongfu

Strength
900 French marine infantry and Cochinchinese riflemen 450 Yellow Flag auxiliaries 1 artillery battery 6 gunboats	1,200 Black Flag soldiers 3,000 Vietnamese soldiers

Casualties and losses
16 dead, 43 wounded	60 Chinese dead (by body count), but most probably several hundred dead and wounded

The Battle of Palan (1 September 1883) was one of several clashes between the Tonkin Expeditionary Corps and Liu Yongfu's Black Flag Army during the Tonkin campaign (1883–1886).

== Background ==
The Battle of Palan ("Ba Làng" in Vietnamese, what means "three villages") was fought two weeks after the Battle of Phủ Hoài, in which General Alexandre-Eugène Bouët (1833–87), the French commandant supérieur in Tonkin, had failed to defeat Liu Yongfu's Black Flag Army. Heavy flooding in mid-August had obliged the Black Flags to abandon their positions in front of the Day River and retreat behind the river. The key to their new positions were the villages of Phong (or Phung), commanding the main road to Sơn Tây at its crossing of the Day River, and Palan (also known as Ba Giang), at the junction of the Red and Day rivers.

Under pressure from Jules Harmand, the French civil commissioner general in Tonkin, Bouët attacked the new Black Flag positions at the end of August to clear the road to Sơn Tây, the ultimate French objective. Bouët committed 1,800 French soldiers to this offensive. The French force consisted of two marine infantry battalions (chefs de bataillon Berger and Roux), each strengthened by contingents of Cochinchinese riflemen, one marine artillery battery (Captain Roussel) and a battalion of Yellow Flag auxiliaries. (Note: Roux's battalion consisted of the 25th, 26th and 27th Companies, 4th Marine Infantry Regiment (Captains Drouin, Taccoën and Lancelot) and the 1st Annamese Rifle Company (Captain de Beauquesne). Berger's battalion consisted of the 26th and 27th Companies, 2nd Marine Infantry Regiment (Captains Doucet and Guérin de Fontjoyeux) and the 2nd and 3rd Annamese Rifle Companies (Captains Boutet and Berger).) The attackers were supported by the gunboats Pluvier, Léopard, Fanfare, Éclair, Hache and Mousqueton from the Tonkin Flotilla, under the command of capitaine de vaisseau Morel-Beaulieu.

== The battle ==
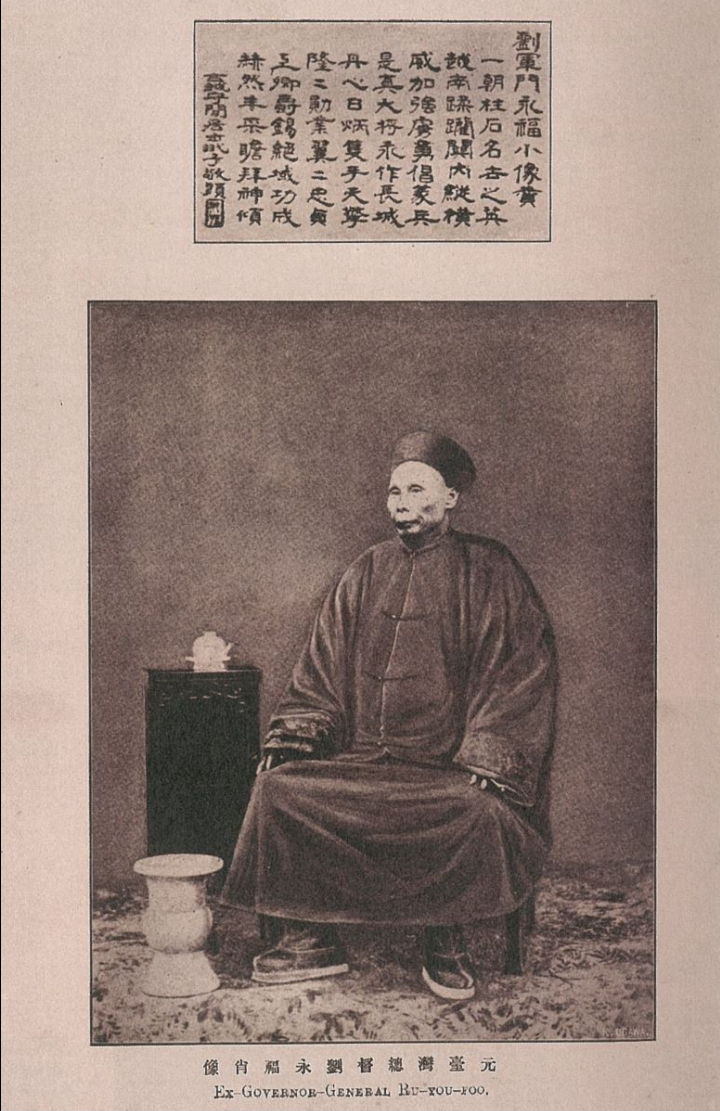
Liu Yongfu (1837–1917)

On 31 August the village of Palan, bombarded from the rear by the gunboats and attacked frontally by Berger's battalion, was captured without difficulty, and its defenders fled in disorder along the dyke.

At dawn on 1 September the column advanced along a two-metre wide dyke which ran along the bank of the Day River towards its main objective: Phong, a principal point on the road to Sơn Tây. Its front and left were screened by heavy skirmish lines of Tonkinese and Cochinchinese riflemen. Meanwhile, the gunboats ascended the Red River. Pluvier and Fanfare remained at the confluence of the Red and Day rivers to support an infantry company guarding Palan, while Mousqueton, Éclair and Hache moved up the Day to support the attack column.

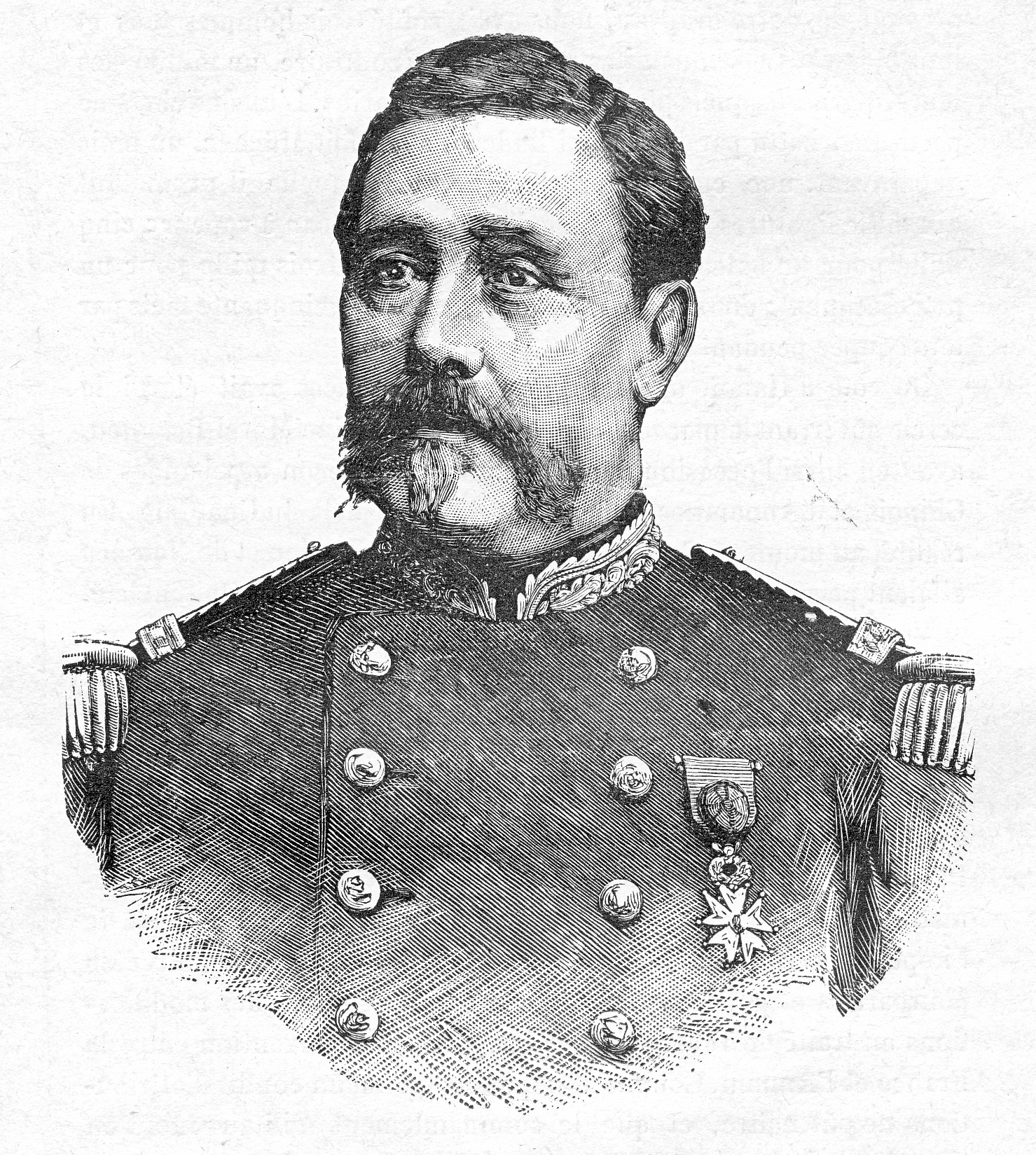
General Alexandre-Eugène Bouët (1833–87)

Three kilometres from Palan, the French began to exchange fire with the Black Flags, who numbered around 1,200 and were supported by 3,000 Vietnamese. The Black Flags, armed with modern Winchester rifles, displayed the greatest courage, and only gave ground foot by foot. The Vietnamese, by contrast, held back. Although they made a lot of noise, yelling and waving their flags and beating their gongs and drums in a warlike manner, they showed little enthusiasm for actually fighting.

Finally the French reached a pagoda at the base of the dyke. The Black Flags had evacuated the pagoda before the French arrived, and fallen back to the centre of their position, which lay behind the earth embankment of a dyke four hundred metres further on. The Black Flags had crowned this embankment with a bamboo fence, and seven large and conspicuous black flags, embroidered in silver, flew side by side at regular intervals along the fence. Behind the dyke Liu Yongfu had his headquarters in a small pagoda with a blue tiled roof. The Black Flags had placed their few artillery pieces along the left and centre of this line, so that their fire could sweep the dyke path that led to their defences.

In this position the Black Flags were almost invisible. The French could only see their large bamboo straw hats. They were firing from cover, with admirable discipline and stubbornness. Casualties began to mount in the French ranks.

Bouët attempted to beat down the enemy fire. Mousqueton, Éclair and Hache took up positions on the Day River behind the dyke, and fired into the unprotected rear of the Black Flag line. Roussel's battery deployed along the dyke, behind the pagoda, and also attempted to bombard the embankment, but with little effect. Most of the French shells had been soaked by the rain which had been falling strongly since the previous evening, and buried themselves without exploding in the soil of the embankment.

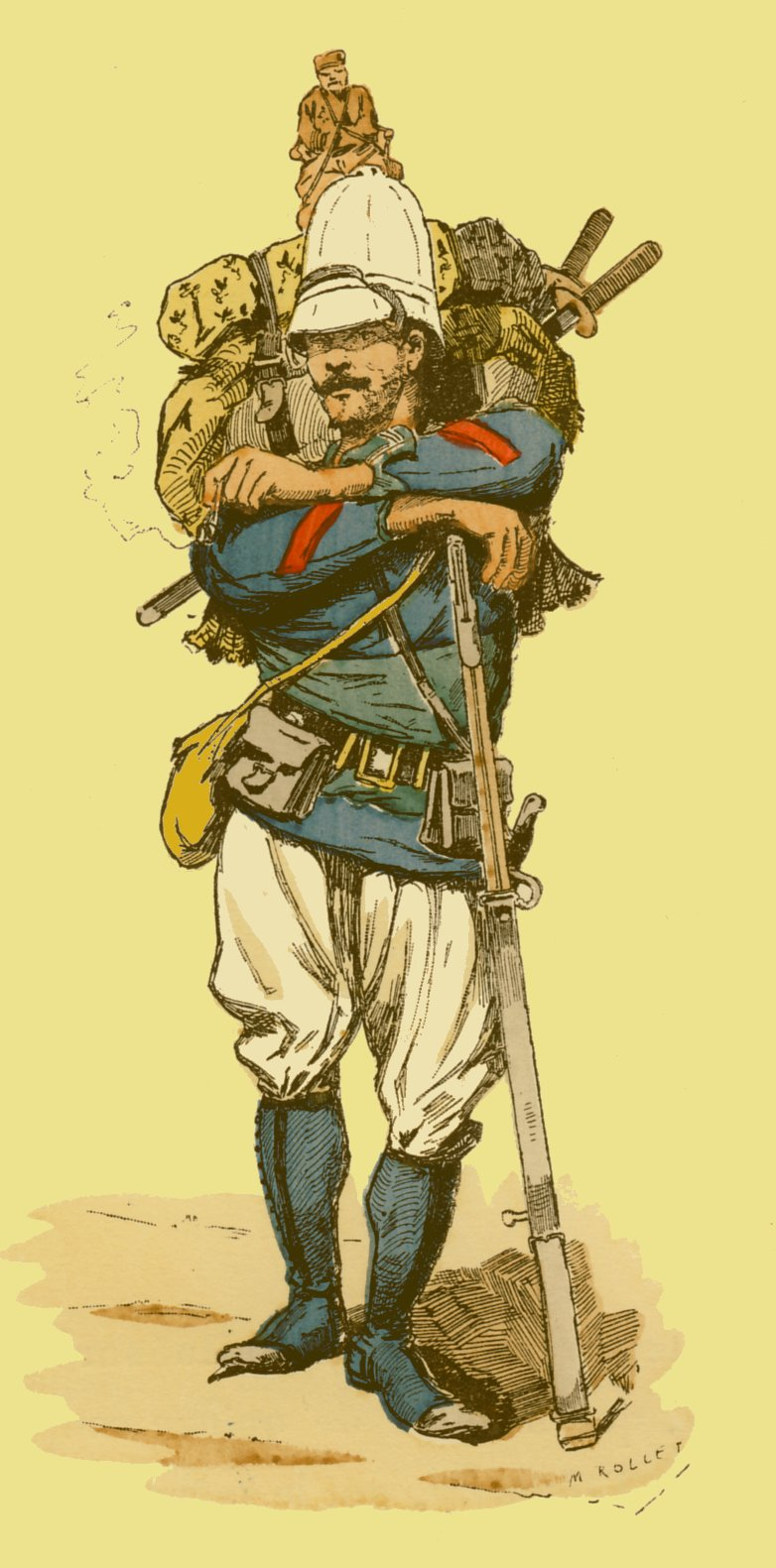
French marine infantryman in Tonkin, 1883

Eventually Bouët ordered Berger to assault the enemy centre, and sent over Taccoën's company from Roux's battalion to reinforce the attack. Berger directed Guérin de Fontjoyeux and Taccoën's marine infantry companies to lead the attack, supported by a company of Cochinchinese riflemen, while the other two companies of his battalion gave covering fire from the pagoda. The assault was made across a stretch of flooded rice paddy. The three attacking companies advanced across the 600-metre gap between the pagoda and the dyke in skirmish order through breast-high water, holding their rifles above their heads to keep them dry. The Black Flags soon distinguished the dark blue blouses of the marine infantry from the black jackets of the Cochinchinese riflemen, and concentrated their fire on the French troops.

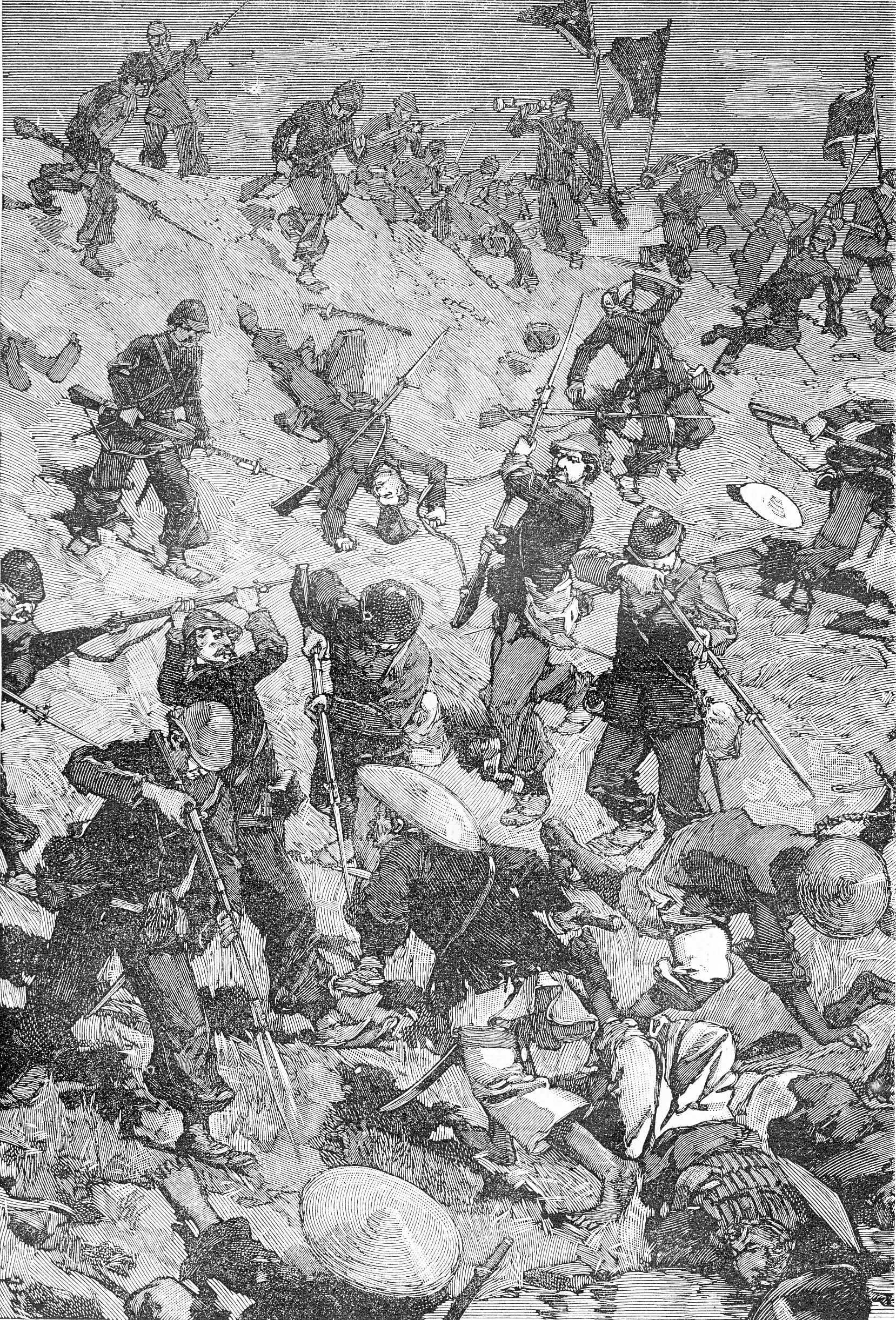
Taccoën's marine infantry company storms the dyke at Palan

When the attacking wave was twenty metres from the dyke the bugles sounded the charge, and the two marine infantry companies stormed the embankment. Taccoën's company, leading the way, lost 5 men killed and 10 wounded in its approach. Guérin de Fontjoyeux's men suffered almost as heavily, and two lieutenants were also killed during the assault. But the attack was so rapid that around fifty Black Flags, who had been lying on their backs asleep, did not have time to get to their feet, and were pinned to the ground with bayonet thrusts. The surviving Chinese fled across the rice paddies. The French killed many of them with rifle fire as they fled.

While Berger was storming the centre of the Black Flag line around Phong, Roux attacked and routed the Vietnamese on the left, burning down the straw huts nestling in the middle of the bamboos. The attack was led by his own Cochinchinese riflemen and the Yellow Flags, with Drouin's marine infantry company deployed behind them to stiffen their resolve. The defenders gave way rather than face the ferocious Yellow Flags, and the attackers were able to take advantage of the collapse of Liu Yongfu's right wing to sweep in towards the centre, where they captured the seven Black Flag standards. As usual, the Black Flags carried off most of their dead, but sixty bodies were abandoned, along with several hundred rifles. Before the scandalised French could stop them, the jubilant Yellow Flags beheaded the corpses, stuck the heads on long bamboo poles, and planted them on the embankment of the dyke.

French casualties in the Battle of Palan were 16 dead and 43 wounded, mostly in the two marine infantry battalions that had stormed the embankment. The Black Flags abandoned 60 bodies on the battlefield, and their total casualties were probably several hundred dead and wounded.

== Aftermath ==
The Yellow Flag auxiliaries plundered a peaceful Vietnamese village shortly after the battle, and Bouët was forced to disband them. Many of the discharged Yellow Flags promptly joined Liu Yongfu's Black Flag Army at Sơn Tây. Three months later they would be fighting against their former paymasters.

== Significance ==
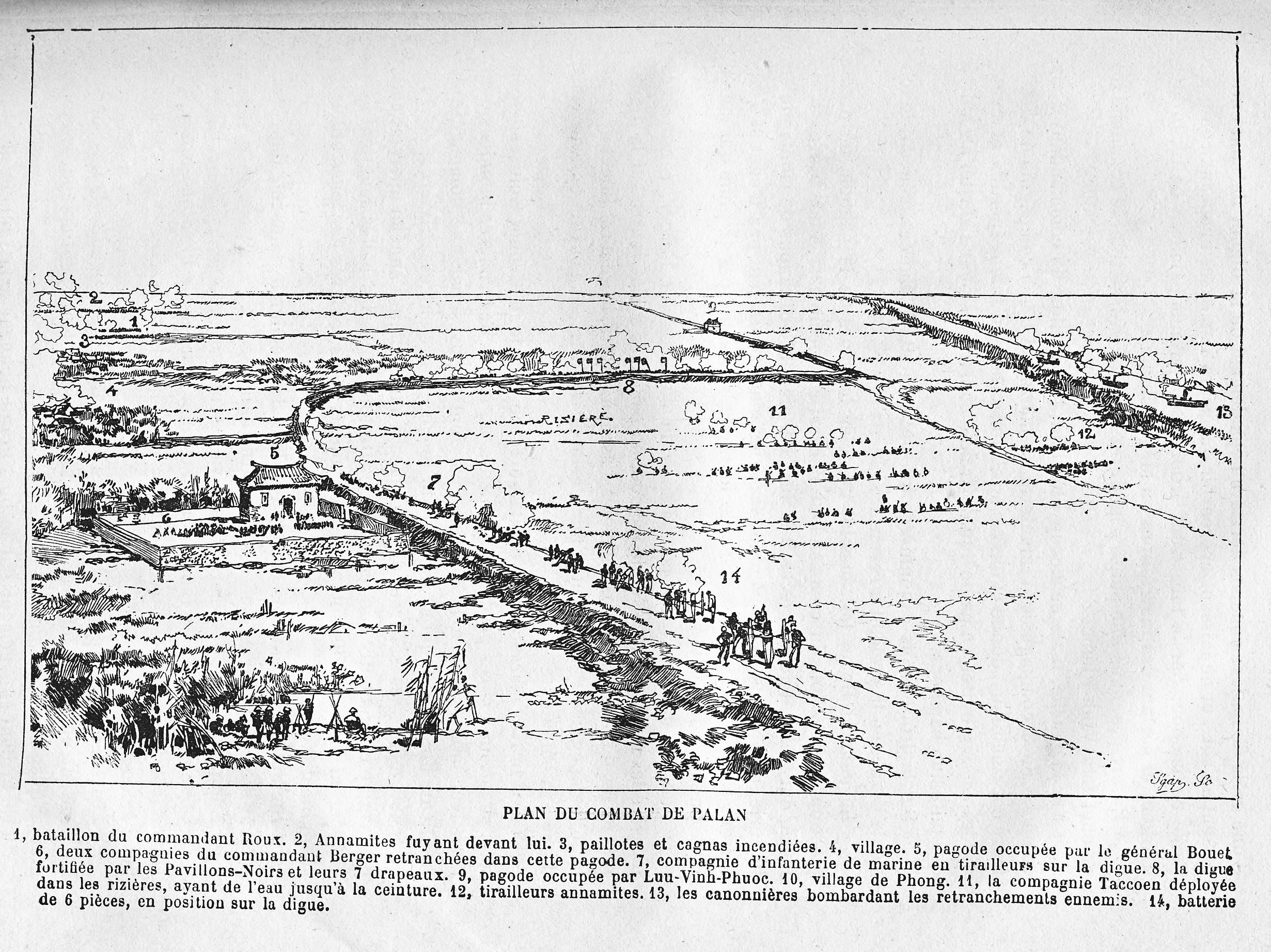
A panoramic view of the battle of Palan

Although the battle was a clear tactical victory for the French, it brought little strategic gain. Liu Yongfu's Black Flags escaped to fight another day, and Liu Yongfu showed his disdain for the French by fortifying yet another defensive position a few kilometres back from the Day River. The French were no nearer to Sơn Tây than they had been before the battle. Bouët was criticised for failing to win a victory of annihilation, and resigned shortly after the battle. Many of his officers regretted his departure, recognising that he had inflicted two defeats upon the Black Flags in difficult circumstances and had avenged the French defeat at the Battle of Paper Bridge in May 1883. But public opinion in France was anxious for a resolution of the Tonkin Campaign, and although the French now installed a post at Palan, enabling their gunboats to patrol the Red River as far as Sơn Tây, this limited advance hardly satisfied Bouët's critics.

More importantly, the battle hardened attitudes both in France and China, and hastened the slide into war. The French premier Jules Ferry substantially reinforced the Tonkin expeditionary corps, while the Chinese stepped up their covert support for the Black Flags in Tonkin.
