= Republic of Formosa =

1895 unrecognized state in Taiwan

Republic of Formosa 臺灣民主國 (Chinese) Táiwān Mínzhǔguó (Mandarin) Tâi-oân Bîn-chú-kok (Taiwanese Hokkien) Thòi-vân Mìn-chú-koet (Hakka)
- 1895
- Flag
- Motto: Forever Qing
- National seal: 民主國之寶印

- The island of Taiwan, on which the Republic of Formosa was established in 1895
- Status: Unrecognized state
- Capital: Taipei (May – June 1895); Tainan (June – October 1895)
- Common languages: Hokkien, Hakka, Formosan languages
- Demonym: Formosan
- Government: Provisional Resistance Republic
- President
  - 1895: Tang Jingsong
  - 1895: Liu Yongfu (de facto)
- Historical era: New Imperialism
  - Independence declared from Qing dynasty: 23 May 1895
  - Occupied by Imperial Japan: 21 October 1895

Area
  - Total: 35,808 km^{2} (13,826 sq mi)
- Currency: Qing Tael
| Preceded by | Succeeded by |
| Taiwan under Qing rule | Taiwan under Japanese rule |
- Today part of: Republic of China (Taiwan)

Republic of Formosa

Chinese name
- Traditional Chinese: 臺灣民主國
- Simplified Chinese: 台湾民主国
- Literal meaning: Democratic State of Taiwan
Transcriptions
Standard Mandarin
- Hanyu Pinyin: Táiwān Mínzhǔguó
- Bopomofo: ㄊㄞˊ ㄨㄢ ㄇㄧㄣˊ ㄓㄨˇ ㄍㄨㄛˊ
- Wade–Giles: T'ai²-wan¹ Min²-chu³-kuo²
- Tongyong Pinyin: Táiwan Mínjhǔguó
Hakka
- Romanization: Thòi-vân Mìn-chú-koet
Southern Min
- Hokkien POJ: Tâi-oân Bîn-chú-kok
- Tâi-lô: Tâi-uân Bîn-tsú-kok

Japanese name
- Hiragana: たいわんみんしゅこく
- Katakana: タイワンミンシュコク
- Kyūjitai: 臺灣民主國
- Shinjitai: 台湾民主国
Transcriptions
- Romanization: Taiwan Minshukoku
- Kunrei-shiki: Taiwan Minsyukoku

The Republic of Formosa was a short-lived unrecognized state that existed on the island of Taiwan in 1895 during the interregnum between the formal cession of Taiwan by the Qing dynasty of China to the Empire of Japan after the Treaty of Shimonoseki. The Republic lasted for 151 days; it was proclaimed on 23 May 1895 and extinguished on 21 October, when its capital of Tainan was taken over by the Japanese and they established control on the island.

== Etymology ==
The name Formosa dates from 1542 when Portuguese sailors sighted an uncharted island and noted it on their maps as Ilha Formosa ("beautiful island"). The name Formosa eventually "replaced all others in European literature" and remained in common use among English speakers into the 20th century.

The term mínzhǔguó (民主國) was an early Chinese translation of the English word republic, pioneered by William Alexander Parsons Martin with his Chinese translation of Henry Wheaton's Elements of International Law. The Japanese equivalent during this time was kyōwakoku (共和國), which became the standard translation for republic in East Asia, while mínzhǔguó came to mean "democratic country" instead. There was also a similar alternative, mínguó (民國), pioneered by Sun Yat-sen (see Republic of China (1912–1949)#Etymology).

== Background ==
In 1894, China and Japan went to war. In a few months, the Japanese defeated China's Beiyang fleet, routed the Chinese armies in Manchuria, and captured Port Arthur and Weihaiwei. Although nearly all the fighting took place in northern China, Japan had important territorial ambitions in southern China. As the war approached its end, the Japanese took steps to ensure that Taiwan would be ceded to Japan under the eventual peace treaty and that they were well placed militarily to occupy the island. In March 1895 peace negotiations between Japan and China opened in the Japanese city of Shimonoseki. Although hostilities in northern China were suspended during these negotiations, Taiwan and the Pescadores were specifically excluded from the scope of the armistice. This exclusion allowed the Japanese to mount a military operation against the Pescadores Islands in March 1895. The Pescadores, lying midway between mainland China and Taiwan, were the key to a successful occupation of Taiwan. In a swift campaign in the last week of March the Japanese captured the islands, preventing further Chinese reinforcements from being sent across the Taiwan Strait to Taiwan. This brisk fait accompli influenced the peace negotiations, and the ensuing Treaty of Shimonoseki, concluded on 17 April 1895, duly provided for the cession by China of Taiwan to Japan. On 10 May, Admiral Kabayama Sukenori was appointed the first Japanese governor-general of Taiwan.

Prior to the independence declaration, gentry in Taiwan approached Britain and then France in a failed attempt to gain protectorate status for Taiwan.

== Proclamation of the Republic ==
When the news of the treaty's contents reached Taiwan, a number of notables from central Taiwan led by Qiu Fengjia decided to resist the transfer of Taiwan to Japanese rule. On 23 May, in Taipei, these men declared independence, proclaiming the establishment of a free and democratic Republic of Formosa. Tang Jingsong, the Qing governor-general of Taiwan, was prevailed upon to become the republic's first President, and his old friend Liu Yongfu, the retired Black Flag Army commander who had become a national hero in China for his victories against the French in northern Vietnam a decade earlier, was invited to serve as Grand General of the Army. Qiu was appointed Grand Commander of Militia, with the power to raise local militia units throughout the island to resist the Japanese. In mainland China, Zhang Zhidong, the powerful governor-general of Liangkiang, tacitly supported the Formosan resistance movement, and the Republicans also appointed Chen Jitong, a disgraced Chinese diplomat who understood European ways of thinking, as the Republic's foreign minister. His job would be to sell the Republic abroad.

== Declaration of independence ==
The declaration has not been preserved in its original Chinese version, although an English version of it was recorded by the American war correspondent James Wheeler Davidson, who was in Taipei when it was issued. Davidson's version reads as follows:

Official Declaration of Independence of the Republic of Formosa.

The Japanese have affronted China by annexing our territory of Formosa, and the supplications of us, the People of Formosa, at the portals of the Throne have been made in vain. We now learn that the Japanese slaves are about to arrive.

If we suffer this, the land of our hearths and homes will become the land of savages and barbarians, but if we do not suffer it, our condition of comparative weakness will certainly not endure long. Frequent conferences have been held with the Foreign Powers, who all aver that the People of Formosa must establish their independence before the Powers will assist them.

Now, therefore, we, the People of Formosa, are irrevocably resolved to die before we will serve the enemy. And we have in Council determined to convert the whole island of Formosa into a Republican state, and that the administration of all our State affairs shall be organized and carried on by the deliberations and decisions of Officers publicly elected by us the People. But as in this new enterprise there is needed, as well for the resistance of Japanese aggression as for the organization of the new administration, a man to have chief control, in whom authority shall centre, and by whom the peace of our homesteads shall be assured—therefore, in view of the respect and admiration in which we have long held the Governor and Commander-in-Chief, Tang Ching Sung, we have in Council determined to raise him to the position of President of the Republic.

An official seal has been cut, and on the second day of fifth moon, at the ssu hour [9 a.m. 25 May], it will be publicly presented with all respect by the notables and people of the whole of Formosa. At early dawn on that day, all of us, notables and people, farmers and merchants, artizans and tradesmen, must assemble at the Tuan Fang Meeting House, that we may in grave and solemn manner inaugurate this undertaking

Let there be neither delay nor mistake. A Declaration of the whole of Formosa. [Seal in red as follows] An announcement by the whole of Formosa.

== International recognition ==
Since the island had already been ceded to Japan in the Treaty of Shimonoseki, Western powers were not in a position to recognize the Republic of Formosa as a legitimate government. There was therefore little sympathy in Europe for the Republic, despite its impeccably 'Parisian' manifesto.

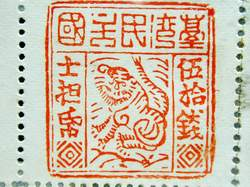
Postage stamp issued by the Republic of Formosa

Although there was considerable unofficial support for the Formosan resistance movement in Beijing, the Qing government's official stance was one of punctilious adherence to the terms of the Treaty of Shimonoseki, as considerable diplomatic efforts were then underway to persuade Japan to relinquish the Liaodong Peninsula, which had also been ceded to Japan under the treaty. Japan's rapacity had aroused concern in Europe, and in a diplomatic demarche known as the Triple Intervention, Russia, France and Germany put pressure on the Japanese government in late April 1895 to restore the peninsula to China. On 5 May the Japanese agreed to retrocede the Liaodong Peninsula to China in return for an increased indemnity, but it took until December 1895 to negotiate the necessary treaty amendments, and while the negotiations were in progress Japanese troops remained in place. During this period the empress dowager and her officials were anxious not to offend Japan, and the Qing court therefore formally disavowed the Republican resistance movement in Taiwan. Shortly before the proclamation of the Republic of Formosa, the Qing court ordered Li Jingfang, the nephew and adopted son of China's elder statesman Li Hongzhang, to proceed to Taiwan and transfer sovereignty over the island from China to Japan. It also cabled an imperial edict to Taipei on 20 May, directing Tang Jingsong to order all Qing civil officials and all officers and soldiers to leave Taiwan. Tang himself was ordered to return to Beijing.

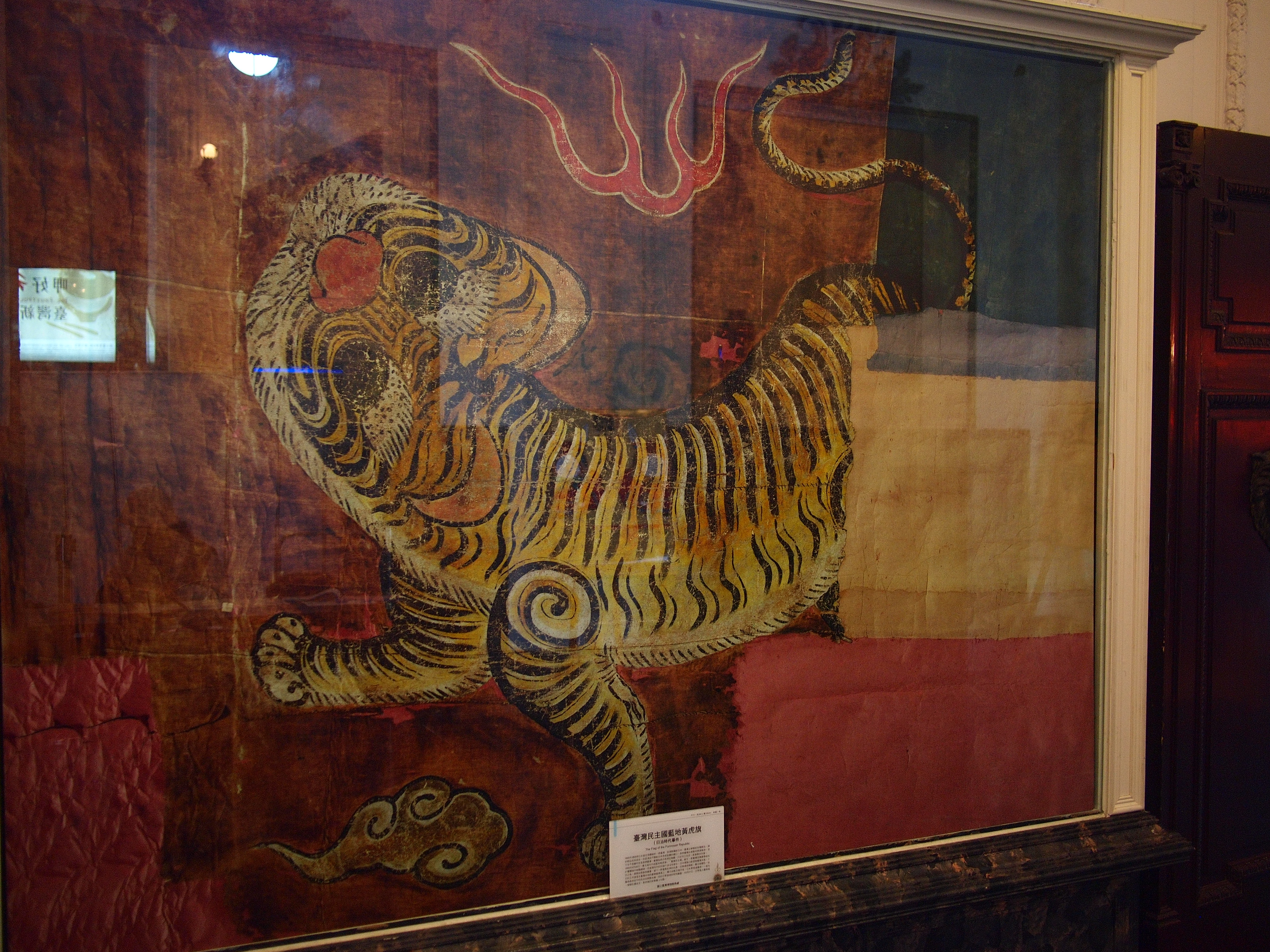
National flag of the 1895 Republic of Formosa exhibited in the National Taiwan Museum

Spurned by European public opinion and officially disavowed by China, the Republic of Formosa enjoyed only one week of uninterrupted existence. During this time it decked itself out with the conventional trappings of sovereignty. The Republicans adopted a national flag with a yellow tiger on a blue background, ordered a large silver state seal to be made, and began to issue paper money and postage stamps in the name of the Republic. The foreign minister Chen Jitong, who had lived in France for many years, was responsible for crafting much of this republican symbolism.

== Administrative organisation ==
Premises were found for the republican parliament and the republican ministries in the yamens of the former Qing administration in Taipei. Tang Jingsong, the president of the republic, remained in the palatial Government House he had previously occupied as the Qing governor-general of Formosa. Tang's cabinet included the heads of the four great ministries of state (war, the navy, home affairs and foreign affairs), who ran their ministries from the large yamens that had previously been the premises of the provincial treasury. The yamens previously used as the headquarters of the Defense Board became Parliament House. The navy department was housed in the old military secretariat.

== Defense ==
Knowing that a Japanese landing was imminent, the Republican leaders did what little they could in the short time given to them to prepare the island's defenses against invasion. Taiwan in May 1895 was not short of soldiers. Tang Jingsong, in order to raise morale, exaggerated their numbers considerably, claiming that he had under his command 150,000 soldiers, regulars and volunteers. Judicious observers believed that this figure should be halved. In all, they calculated, there were 75,000 soldiers scattered throughout the island, of whom 50,000 were in the northern half and 25,000 in the southern half. These troops included the regular soldiers of the Qing garrison, local volunteers, and Hakka militia units hastily raised on the orders of Qiu Fengjia.

The Qing garrison of Formosa amounted to around 50,000 soldiers, armed for the most part with modern repeating rifles. Liu Yongfu commanded around 20,000 men down in the south, around Tainan, while Qiu Fengjia commanded the central garrisons, perhaps another 10,000 men. The 30,000 men of the northern garrisons were under the command of a Chinese admiral named Yang. Local volunteer and Hakka militia units seem to have accounted for a further 25,000 men.

== Collapse ==
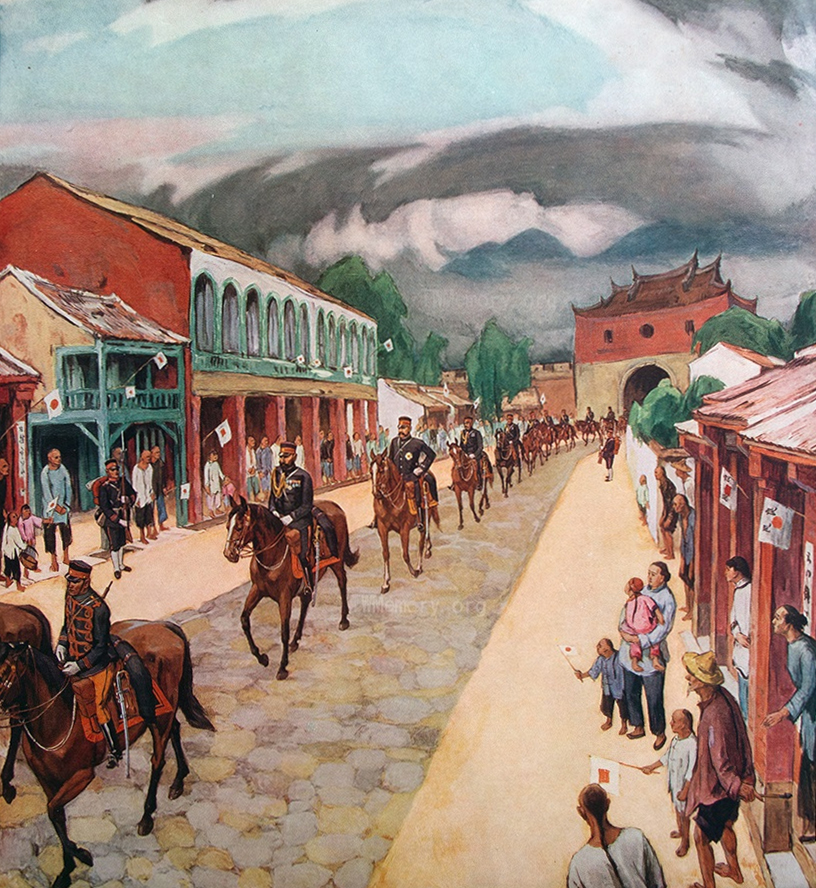
Japanese troops enter Taipei, 11 June 1895

The Republic of Formosa survived for only five months. The Japanese landed near Keelung on the northern coast of Taiwan on 29 May 1895, and in a five-month campaign swept southwards to Tainan. During the night of 4 June 1895, on the news that the Japanese had captured Keelung, President Tang and General Qiu fled to Tamsui, and from there sailed for the mainland on the evening of 6 June. The Japanese entered Taipei shortly afterwards.

Following Tang's flight, Liu Yongfu assumed the mantle of leadership of the Republic in Tainan. He refused to serve as president, however, and stressed instead his role as commander-in-chief of the resistance against the Japanese. The capture of Tainan now became both a political and a military imperative for the Japanese. During the next three months, although their advance was slowed by guerilla activity, the Japanese defeated the Formosan forces whenever they attempted to make a stand. The Japanese victory at Baguashan on 27 August 1895, the largest battle ever fought on Taiwanese soil, doomed the Formosan resistance to an early defeat. The fall of Tainan on 21 October 1895 ended organised resistance to Japanese occupation, and inaugurated five decades of Japanese rule in Taiwan.

One of the republic's resistance fighters was Lin Sen, future President of the Republic of China. During World War II, Lin urged the return of Taiwan be included in the Allies' war aims which was accomplished shortly after his death with the Cairo Declaration. There are roads named after him throughout the island.

== Historical significance ==
In spite of the similarities between their names, modern supporters of Taiwan independence who call for the establishment of a Republic of Taiwan are wary of claiming that their own movement owes anything to the example of the 1895 republic. The reason for this is that Tang Jingsong and his adherents continued to recognise Chinese suzerainty, while modern advocates of a Republic of Taiwan seek complete independence. Nitobe Inazō wrote, "Mr. Tang was elected president and the Republic of Formosa lasted three or four months, leaving behind nothing but some post-stamps valuable for collectors."

== Leaders ==
| No. | Portrait | Name (Birth–Death) | Place of birth | Term of Office | | Days |
|---|---|---|---|---|---|---|
| 1 | | Tang Jingsong 唐景崧; Táng Jǐngsōng (Mandarin); Tn̂g Kéng-siông (Taiwanese); Thòng Kín-chhiùng (Hakka) (1841–1903); President | Guilin, Guangxi, China | 25 May 1895; Yongqing 1–5–25; Guangxu 21–5–2; Meiji 28–5–25 | 5 June 1895; Yongqing 1–6–5; Meiji 28–6–5 | 13 |
| 2 | | Liu Yongfu 劉永福; Liú Yǒngfú (Mandarin); Lâu Éng-hok (Taiwanese); Liû Yún-fuk (Hakka) (1837–1917); Commander-in-chief | Qinzhou, Guangxi, China | 5 June 1895; Yongqing 1–6–5; Meiji 28–6–5 | 21 October 1895; Yongqing 1–10–21; Meiji 28–10–21 | 138 |

== In popular culture ==
- In 2007 the Taiwan Public Television Service Foundation broadcast the 20-episode historical drama The War of Betrayal 1895 (亂世豪門).
- The Taiwanese movie 1895 was released in 2008. It is based on the novel Love Back to the Earth (情歸大地) by Li Chiao (李喬).

== See also ==
- History of Taiwan
- Taiwan under Qing rule
- Taiwan under Japanese rule
