= Yunnan Army =

1880s Qing Army commanded by Liu Yongfu

The Yunnan Army was an army raised by the Qing dynasty to fight in the Sino-French War during the Tonkin Campaign. Liu Yongfu was a commander of the Yunnan army.
