= Black Flag Army =

1860s–1885 mercenary group in north Vietnam

- 黑旗軍 · Quân cờ đen · 軍旗黰
- Possible reconstruction of a Black Flag Army's command flag
- Active: 1860s–1885
- Country: China, Vietnam
- Allegiance: Qing dynasty, Nguyễn dynasty
- Size: 5,000–7,000
- Engagements: Garnier Expedition; Tonkin campaign Sino-French War; Pacification of Tonkin

Commanders
- Commander: Liu Yongfu

The Black Flag Army (Chinese: 黑旗軍; pinyin: Hēiqí Jūn; Vietnamese: Quân cờ đen, chữ Nôm: 軍旗黰) was a splinter remnant of a bandit and mercenary group recruited largely from soldiers of ethnic Zhuang background and former Taiping soldiers who crossed the border in 1865 from Guangxi, China into northern Vietnam, during the Nguyễn dynasty, and were hired and sponsored by Vietnamese authorities to fight against other bandits and rebels. Although brigands, they were known mainly for their fights against the invading French forces, who were then moving into Tonkin (northern Vietnam). The Black Flag Army is so named because of the preference of its commander, Liu Yongfu, for using black command flags.

The army was officially disbanded in 1885 as a result of the Treaty of Tientsin between France and China. However, remnants of the army continued to wage a guerrilla war against French colonial authorities for years. With the sanction of both Vietnamese and Chinese authorities, the Black Flags joined the Vietnamese irregular forces, stemming French encroachment beyond the Red River Delta.

== The rise and fall of the Black Flag Army ==
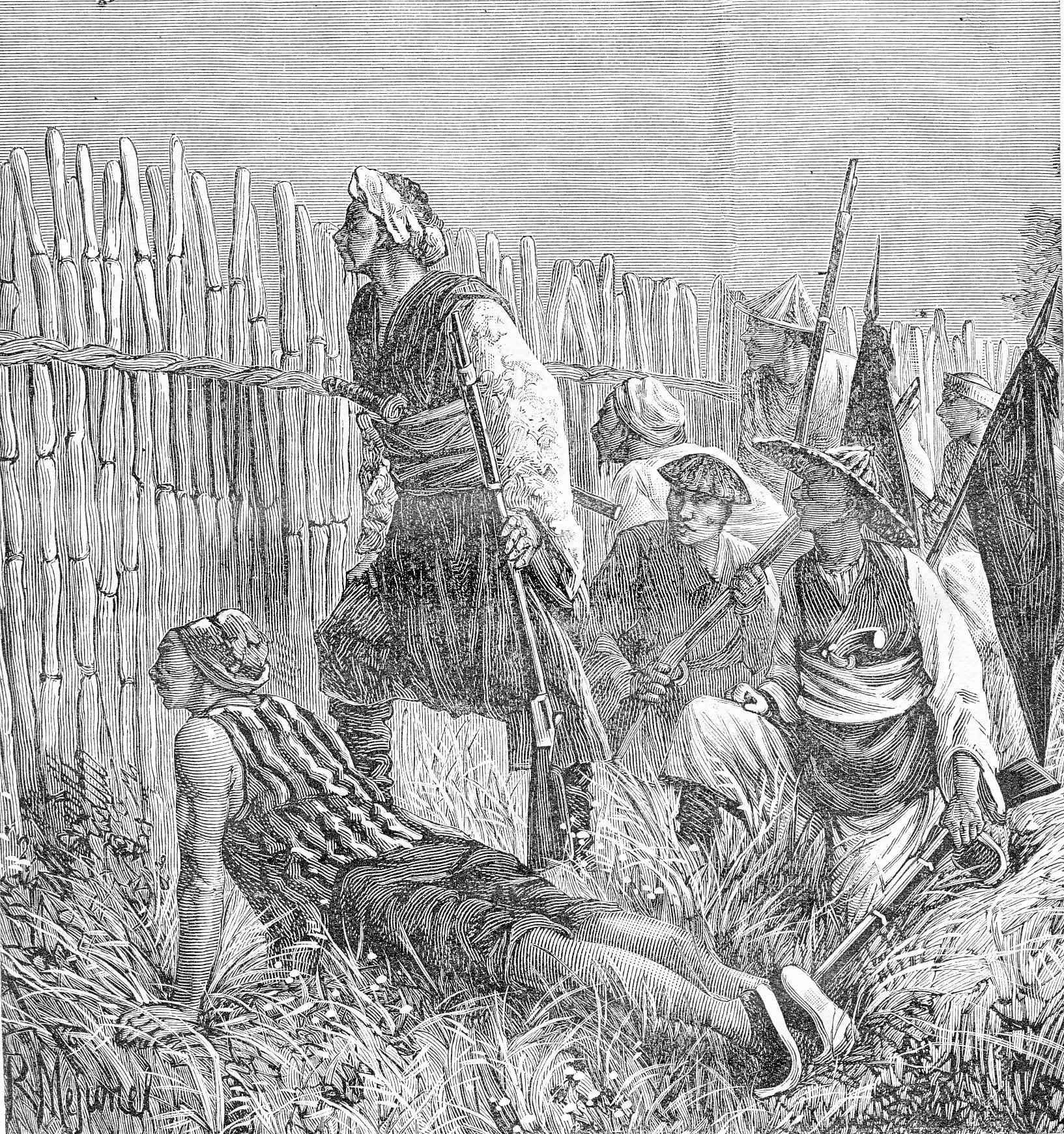
A Black Flag ambush, 1883

In 1857, Liu Yongfu, a Hakka soldier of fortune, commanded a group of about 200 men within a larger Highwayman group in Guangxi province headed by Huang Sihong (Chinese: 黃思宏). He allied with the Taiping forces in the region. He defected with his men to the band of Wu Yuanqing (Chinese: 吳元清) under his own black flag. Liu organized a ceremony reminiscent of the tiandihui (天地会) rituals and what became known as the Black Flag Army was born. The "army" operated as an independent unit under Wu Yuanqing and under his son and successor, Wu Yazhong (Chinese: 吳亞終) or Wu Hezhong. Although not part of the Taiping forces, both Wu Yuanqing and Wu Yazhong laid claim to be Taiping "princes".

After Qing forces crushed the Taiping Rebellion in 1864 in Nanking, the Qing army proceeded to destroy systematically the many armed bands of their south-eastern provinces. Hotly pursued, the desperate Wu Yazhong, with Liu and his Black Flag Army who had also taken over the former Taiping army in the region, crossed into Upper Tonkin in 1865, looting and pillaging villages on their way.

The Black Flags demonstrated their usefulness to the Vietnamese court by helping the suppression of the indigenous Hmong tribes populating the mountainous terrain between the Red and Black Rivers, and for this Liu was rewarded with an official military title.

Secured with the backing of the Vietnamese court, Liu Yongfu established a profitable extortion network along the course of the Red River, "taxing" river commerce between Sơn Tây and Lào Cai at a rate of 10%. He and the Black Flag Army also took over mines in the region and created a protection system, as well as robbing villages in the countryside. The profits accrued from this venture were so great that Liu's army swelled in numbers in the 1870s, attracting to its ranks adventurers from all over the world. Although most of the Black Flag soldiers were Chinese, the junior officers included American and European soldiers of fortune, some of whom had seen action in the Taiping Rebellion. Liu used their expertise to transform the Black Flag Army into a formidable fighting force. Under his command in Tonkin he had 7,000 soldiers from Guangdong and Guangxi.

The harassment of European vessels trading on the Red River triggered the dispatch of the French expeditionary force to Tonkin under Commandant Henri Rivière in 1882. The resulting clashes between the French and the Black Flag Army (the latter abetted by the regular Vietnamese and Chinese forces) escalated, resulting eventually in the Sino-French War (August 1884–April 1885). The Black Flags assisted the Chinese forces during this war, best known for the fierce Siege of Tuyên Quang when the joint Black Flag-Chinese armies besieged a battalion of the French Foreign Legion defending the citadel. The Black Flag Army formally disbanded at the end of the Sino-French War, though many of its members continued to harass the French for years afterwards as freelance bandits.

Remarkably, Liu Yongfu revived the Black Flag Army again in 1895 in response to the Japanese invasion of Taiwan (1895). Liu Yongfu crossed to Taiwan at the appeal of his old friend Tang Jingsong, the island's former governor-general and now president of the short-lived Republic of Formosa. Liu was to command the Formosan resistance forces against the Japanese. Liu took a number of aging Black Flag veterans back into service to join the fight against the Japanese, but the reconstituted Black Flag Army was swept aside with ease by the Japanese Imperial Guards Division. Liu himself was obliged to disguise himself as an old woman to escape capture.

An entry on the Black Flags in "Appletons' Annual Cyclopaedia and Register of Important Events, Volume 8; Volume 23":

"The Black Flags-More formidable than the Anamese army were the irregular soldiers known as the Black and the Yellow Flags. These troops were not Anamese but Chinese, and it is not known to what extent they were augmented by volunteers from the neighboring Chinese provinces. They are survivors of the valorous Taeping rebels who held the military power of the Chinese Empire at bay for many years. In 1865 the rebels, who had retired before the Chinese troops into the province of Kwangsi, were finally driven across the border into Tonquin, and found a secure retreat in the mountains on both sides of the Red river valley. This band of exiles, numbering about 5,000, were accompanied by their wives and families. Their chief was Watsong, one of Taeping Wang's principal lieutenants, and many of them continued the freebooting practices into which the rebellion degenerated in its latter period. They offered no further hostility to the Chinese Government, but rather became the supporters and instruments of Chinese policy and influence in Anam. The Anamese troops were sent against them several times, but were invariably defeated. In 1868 they held undisputed possession of the whole right bank of the Red river above the capital. With the assistance of the Chinese Viceroy of Canton, or Governor-General of the two Kwang, they were finally expelled from the low country and confined to the upper course of the river. Soon after Watsong died, and his followers divided into two bands. The main body of the original Taeping rebels were disposed to settle down to peaceful pursuits, and to make their submission to the Chinese and Anamese authorities. They adopted the yellow flag for their ensign, and chose for their chief llwang Tsoug In, who had been a soldier in the Chinese territorial army of Kwangsi. The smaller band, which retained the black flag, was composed of criminals and desperate characters who had joined the band of Watsong in the hope of plunder or to escape from justice, and their new leader was formerly the most famous brigand in the province of Kwangsi. The principal settlement of the Black Flags is at Aokai, on Red river; that of the Yellow Flags at Hagiung, farther in the interior and east of that place. The Anamese subsidized the Yellow Flags partly to act as a check upon the troublesome Black Flags, and were glad to avail themselves of both in their conflicts with the French. It was through a want of precaution against the skill aud courage of the Black Flags that Garnier lost his life in 1873, and through a repetition of the same blunder Riviera sufiered defeat and death in 1883. Both the Black and Yellow Flags have greatly increased in number since they were expelled from Chinese territory, the former numbering in 1883 probably not fewer than 5,000 warriors, and the latter perhaps twice as many."

== The Black Flag Army in action ==
=== Killing of Lieutenant Francis Garnier, December 1873 ===
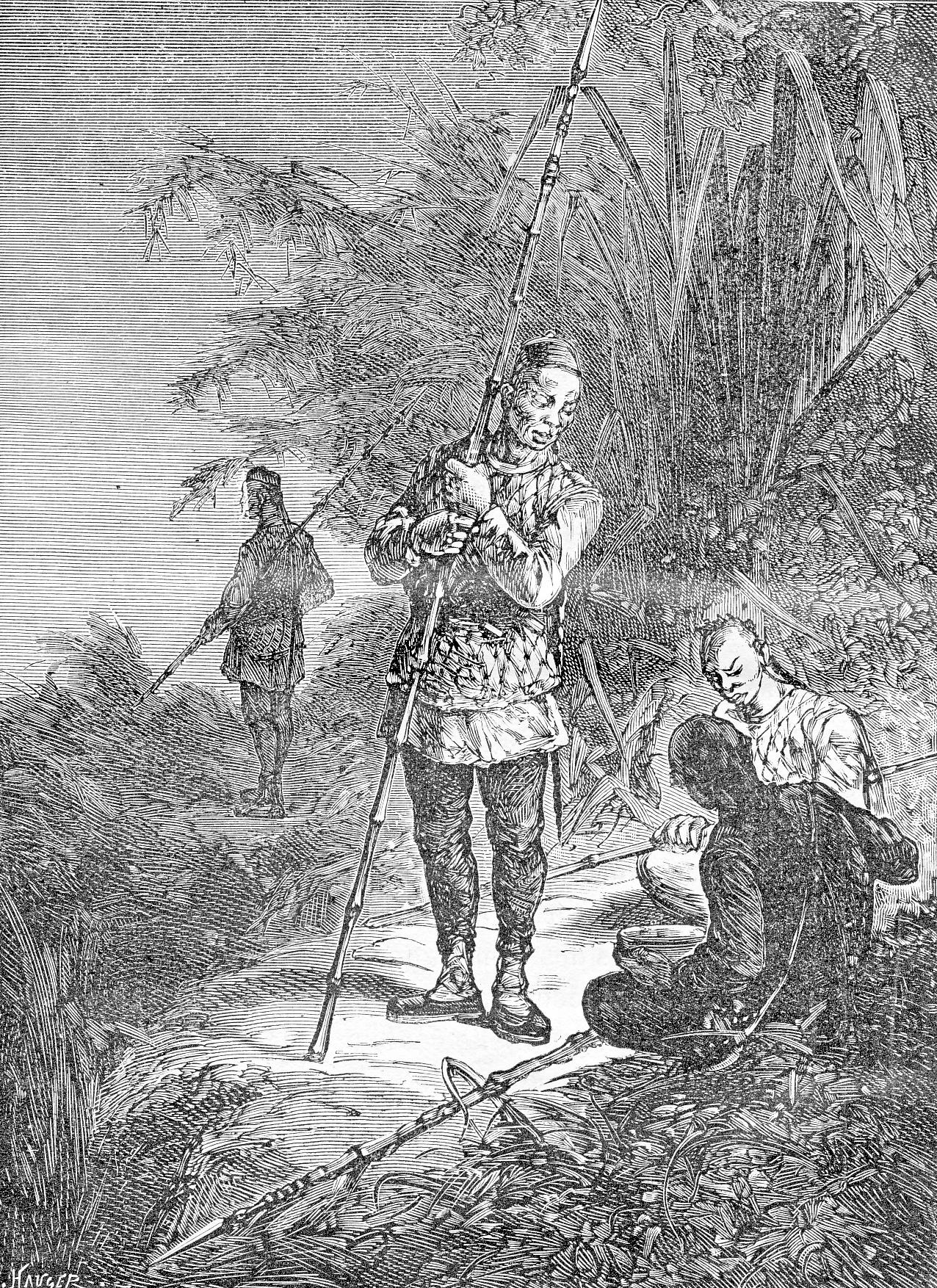
Black Flag soldiers, 1873

In 1873, the Vietnamese government enlisted the help of the Black Flag Army to face an attempt to conquer Tonkin by French naval lieutenant Francis Garnier, who was acting without orders after having been sent there on a diplomatic mission. On 21 December 1873, Liu Yongfu and around 600 Black Flags (French: pavillons noirs, drapeaux noirs), marching beneath an enormous black banner, approached the west gate of the Hanoi Citadel. A large Vietnamese army followed in their wake. Garnier ordered the shelling of the Black Flags with a field piece mounted above the gate and, when they were repulsed, led a party of 18 French marine infantrymen out of the gate in pursuit. Garnier and three of his men charged uphill in a bayonet attack on a party of Black Flags but was speared to death after stumbling in a watercourse. The youthful enseigne de vaisseau Adrien-Paul Balny d’Avricourt led a similar small column to reinforce Garnier but was also killed in front of his men. Three other French soldiers were also killed in these sorties, and the others fled back to the citadel after their officers fell.

Despite Garnier's death, the attempt to retake Hanoi had failed and the French remained in control of the greater part of the Red River Delta. However, the French government disapproved the unauthorized conquest and lieutenant Paul Philastre was sent to remove Garnier's men from the cities they occupied and repatriate them back to Saigon in February 1874.

During this period, the Black Flag Army also successfully fought other groups of bandits and mercenaries, such as the White Flag Army and Yellow Flag Army.

=== Defeat of Henri Rivière's invasion of Tonkin, May 1883 ===
Ten years later, with France again pushing into Tonkin, undeclared hostilities broke out in 1883 and the first half of 1884 as a prelude to the Sino-French War. The Black Flags fought several engagements against French forces in Tonkin. The first major clash was at the Battle of Paper Bridge (19 May 1883), in which the French naval captain Henri Rivière was ambushed and killed. It was a swift and striking victory for the Black Flag Army.

=== Indecisive clashes, summer 1883 ===
In the Battle of Phủ Hoài (15 August 1883), the Black Flag Army successfully defended its positions against a French attack launched by General Alexandre-Eugène Bouët, though it took considerably higher casualties than the French. In the Battle of Palan (1 September 1883) the Black Flags did less well, being driven from a key position on the River Đáy.

=== Disaster at Sơn Tây, December 1883 ===
In December 1883, the Black Flag Army suffered a major defeat at the hands of Admiral Amédée Courbet in the Sơn Tây Campaign. Despite fighting with fanatical courage in the engagements at Phù Sa on 14 December and Sơn Tây on 16 December, the Black Flags were unable to prevent the French from storming Sơn Tây. Even with large Chinese and Vietnamese regular contingents at Sơn Tây, the Black Flag Army bore the brunt of the fighting, and took very heavy casualties. In the opinion of the British observer William Mesny, a senior officer in the Chinese army, the fighting at Sơn Tây broke the power of the Black Flag Army, though the stubborn defence put up by the Black Flags in the Battle of Hòa Mộc fifteen months later does not bear out this assessment.

=== Loss of Hưng Hóa, April 1884 ===
The Black Flag Army took no part in the Bắc Ninh Campaign (March 1884). After the French capture of Bac Ninh, the Black Flags retreated to Hưng Hóa. In April 1884 the French advanced on Hưng Hóa with both brigades of the Tonkin Expeditionary Corps. The Black Flags had constructed a series of fortifications around the town, but General Charles-Théodore Millot, the French commander-in-chief, took it without a single French casualty. While General François de Négrier's 2nd Brigade pinned the Black Flags frontally from the east and subjected Hung Hoa to a ferocious artillery bombardment from the Trung Xa heights, General Louis Brière de l'Isle's 1st Brigade made a flank march to the south to cut Liu's line of retreat. On the evening of 11 April, seeing Brière de l'Isle's Turcos and marine infantry emerging behind their flank at Xuân Đông, the Black Flags evacuated Hưng Hóa before they were trapped inside it. They set alight the remaining buildings before they left, and on the following morning the French found the town completely abandoned.

=== Loss of Tuyen Quang, June 1884 ===
The Black Flag Army retreated up the Red River to Thanh Quan, only a few days march from the frontier town of Lào Cai. Several hundred Black Flag soldiers, demoralised by the ease with which Courbet and Millot had defeated the Black Flag Army, surrendered to the French in the summer of 1884. One of Millot's final achievements was to advance up the Lô River and throw the Black Flag Army out of Tuyên Quang in the first week of June, again without a single French casualty. If the French had seriously pursued Liu Yongfu after the capture of Tuyên Quang, the Black Flags would probably have been driven from Tonkin there and then. But French attention was diverted by the sudden crisis with China provoked by the Bắc Lệ ambush (23 June 1884), and during the eventful summer of 1884 the Black Flags were left to lick their wounds.

=== Alliance with the Chinese, September 1884 to April 1885 ===
The fortunes of the Black Flag Army were transformed by the outbreak of the Sino-French War in August 1884. The Empress Dowager Cixi responded to the news of the destruction of China's Fujian Fleet at the Battle of Fuzhou (23 August 1884) by ordering her generals to invade Tonkin to throw the French out of Hanoi. Tang Jingsong, the commander of the Yunnan Army, knew that Liu's services would be invaluable in the war with France, and Liu agreed to take part with the Black Flag Army in the forthcoming campaign. The Black Flags helped the Chinese forces put pressure on Hưng Hóa and the isolated French posts of Phủ Doãn and Tuyên Quang during the autumn of 1884.

=== The battle of Hòa Mộc, March 1885 ===
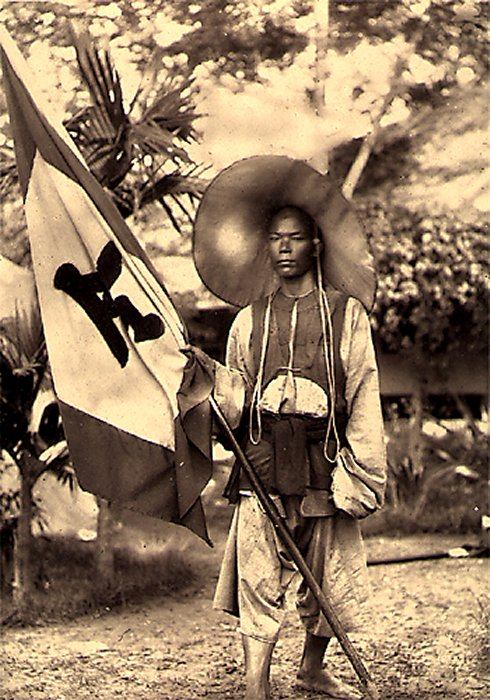
A soldier of the Black Flag Army, 1885

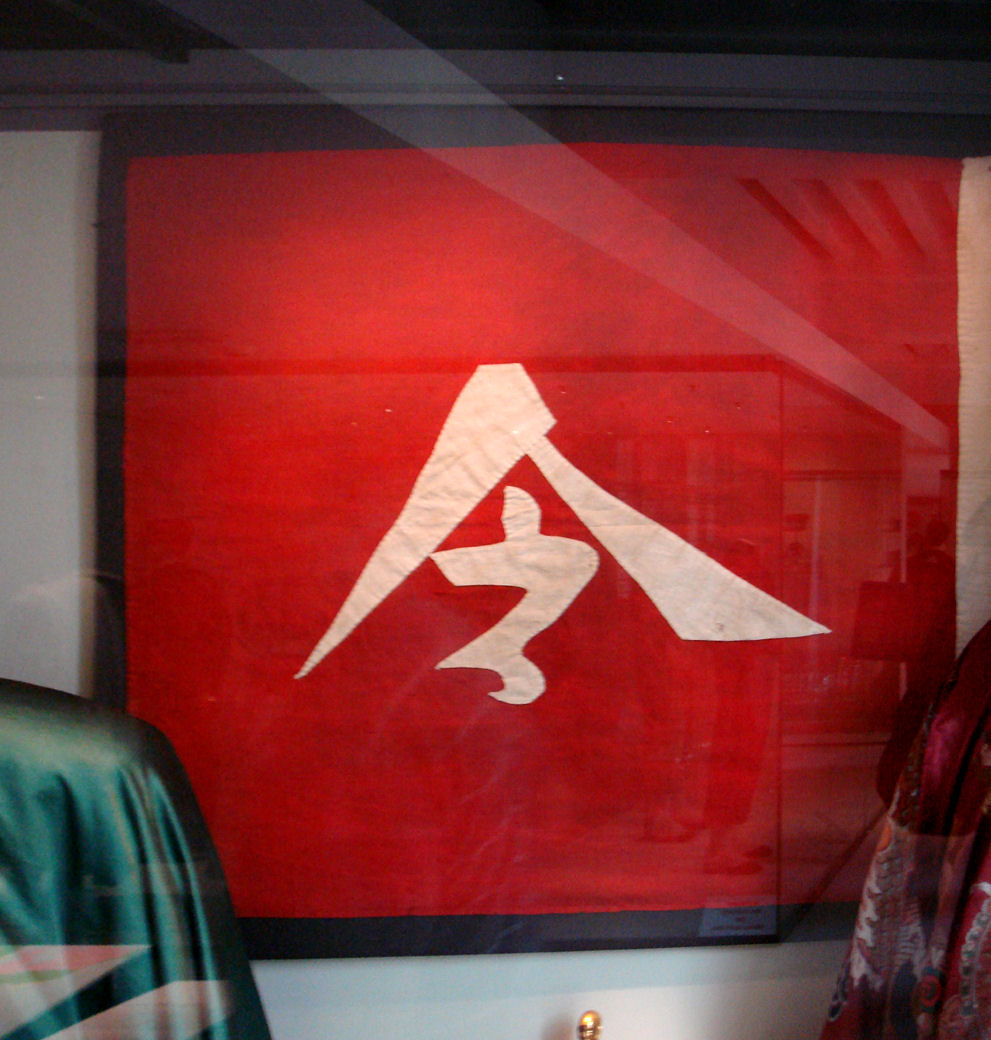
A Black Flag banner, captured by the French at Hòa Mộc (2 March 1885) and now displayed in the Musée de l'Armée, Paris

In the winter and spring of 1885 3,000 soldiers of the Black Flag Army served during the Siege of Tuyên Quang. At the Battle of Hòa Mộc (2 March 1885), the Black Flag Army inflicted heavy casualties on a French column marching to the relief of Tuyên Quang. French casualties at Hòa Mộc were 76 dead and 408 wounded, the highest casualty rate and the heaviest loss in a single day's fighting sustained by the French during the Sino-French War. Many French officers at Hòa Mộc said that the carnage was even worse than at Sơn Tây fifteen months earlier.

=== Disbandment of the Black Flag Army, June 1885 ===
One of the conditions of the peace treaty between France and China that ended the Sino-French War was that Liu Yongfu should leave Tonkin. By the end of the war Liu had only around 2,000 troops under his command and was in no position to resist pressure from Tang Jingsong and the other commanders of the Yunnan Army to remove the Black Flag Army. Liu crossed into China with some of his most loyal followers, but the bulk of the Black Flag Army was disbanded on Tonkinese soil in the summer of 1885. Unpaid for months and still in possession of their rifles, most of the unwanted Black Flag soldiers immediately took to banditry, under cover of the Cần Vương resistance movement against the French. It took months for the French to reduce them, and the route between Hưng Hóa and the border town of Lào Cai was only secured in February 1886. In 1887, Black Flag bandits remained sufficiently powerful to ransack and pillage Luang Prabang.

== Flags of the Black Flag Army ==
A possible reconstruction of Liu Yongfu's command flags at Sơn Tây

Liu Yongfu evidently had a personal preference for the colour black, having dreamt in his youth that he would one day become a 'general of the black tiger'. The Black Flag Army is named from the colour of Liu's command flags.

French sources invariably mention that Liu Yongfu's personal command flags were very large, black in colour, and rectangular. In December, 1873, when Liu Yongfu confronted Francis Garnier outside Hanoi, the Black Flag Army was described as marching under enormous black flags. At the Battle of Palan (September 1, 1883), Liu Yongfu's headquarters was marked with seven identical black flags that were bordered in silver. In the Sơn Tây Campaign (December, 1883), Liu Yongfu ordered three large black flags to be flown above the main gate of the citadel of Sơn Tây, bearing Chinese characters in white.

Individual Black Flag units flew a variety of flags, some rectangular and others triangular. In the afternoon of August 15, 1883, during the Battle of Phủ Hoài, several units of the Black Flag Army emerged from their defences and advanced across open ground to attack the French left wing; according to a French eyewitness, the advancing Black Flag units bore numerous black banners decorated with Chinese characters in either red or white.

Surviving Black Flag banners include a black triangular banner with a representation in white of the seven stars of the Great Bear. The reconstruction shown here displays the Chinese character 令, which, translated to English, currently means "order" or "command".

== See also ==
- Haw wars

== Notes ==
- This article incorporates text from China: A collection of correspondence and papers relating to Chinese affairs, by Great Britain. Foreign Office, a publication from 1885, now in the public domain in the United States.
