= Tang Jingsong =

Chinese general and statesman (1841–1903)

- 唐景崧
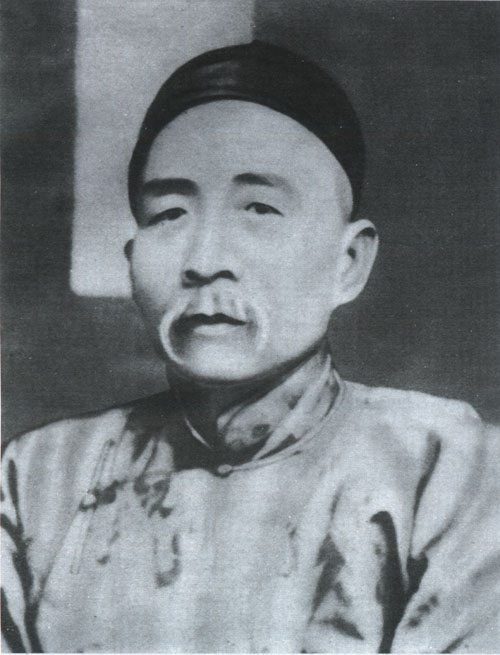

President of the Republic of Formosa
- In office 23 May 1895 – 5 June 1895
- Preceded by: Himself (as governor of Taiwan)
- Succeeded by: Liu Yongfu

Governor of Taiwan Province
- In office 1894 – 23 May 1895
- Preceded by: Shao Youlian
- Succeeded by: Himself (as President of Formosa)

Personal details
- Born: 1841
- Died: 1903 (aged 61–62) Guilin, Guangdong (now Guangxi), Qing dynasty

Military service
- Allegiance: Qing dynasty Republic of Formosa
- Commands: Yunnan Army
- Battles/wars: Sino-French War; Japanese Invasion of Taiwan

Chinese name
- Chinese: 唐景崧
Transcriptions
Standard Mandarin
- Hanyu Pinyin: Táng Jǐngsōng
- Wade–Giles: T'ang^{2} Ching^{3}-sung^{1}
Southern Min
- Hokkien POJ: Tn̂g Kéng-siông

Tang Jingsong (Chinese: 唐景崧; Wade–Giles: T'ang Ching-sung; Pe̍h-ōe-jī: Tn̂g Kéng-siông; 1841–1903) was a Chinese general and statesman. He commanded the Yunnan Army in the Sino-French War (August 1884–April 1885), and made an important contribution to Qing dynasty China's military effort in Tonkin (northern Vietnam) by persuading the Black Flag leader Liu Yongfu to serve under Chinese command. His intelligent, though ultimately unsuccessful, direction of the Siege of Tuyên Quang (November 1884–March 1885) was widely praised. He later became governor of the Chinese province of Taiwan. Following China's cession of Taiwan to Japan at the end of the First Sino-Japanese War (1894–1895) he became president of the short-lived Republic of Formosa.

== The Sino-French War ==
Tang Jingsong played an important role in the Sino-French War and during the period of undeclared hostilities that preceded it. In 1882 he was sent by the Qing government to Vietnam to assess the ability of the Vietnamese government to resist French expansion in Tonkin. During his stay he was able to persuade Liu Yongfu to take the field against the French with the Black Flag Army. Liu's intervention resulted in the French defeat in the Battle of Paper Bridge on 19 May 1883, in which the French commandant supérieur Henri Rivière was killed. In the wake of this disaster, Jules Ferry's government committed substantial military and naval forces to Tonkin.

Tang was the only senior Chinese commander to take part in the Sơn Tây Campaign (December 1883). Although Liu Yongfu and his Vietnamese and Chinese allies failed to hold Sơn Tây against the French, Tang's loyalty to Liu on that occasion was never forgotten by the Black Flag leader. In September 1884 Tang led the Yunnan Army down the Red River from Lào Cai to threaten the French post of Tuyên Quang, and Liu Yongfu took service with him as a subordinate general.

Although he ultimately failed to capture the French post, Tang's intelligent and methodical conduct of the Siege of Tuyên Quang was praised by many of his Chinese colleagues, including Zhang Zhidong, the Viceroy of Liangguang, and Cen Yuying (岑毓英), the Viceroy of Yun-Gui.

Captain Jean-François-Alphonse Lecomte, one of the more discerning officers of the Tonkin Expeditionary Corps, also paid tribute to the skill T'ang's army had shown in its siegecraft at Tuyên Quang:

The mandarins had directed the attack on Tuyen Quang in a very intelligent manner. Owing to the Moslem insurrection in Yunnan, an insurrection that had nearly engulfed the entire province and was only put down by Marshal Ma after several sieges, they were now experts in the art of siegecraft. Their troops were excellent, and although they were unable to capture the fortress, defended as it was by a handful of heroes and relieved in the very nick of time by Giovanninelli's brigade, this siege was nonetheless a glorious feat of arms for the Celestials and showed that when necessary they could rise to the occasion.

== The Republic of Formosa ==
Tang succeeded Shao Youlian (邵友濂) as governor of Taiwan in 1894. Upon the outbreak of the First Sino-Japanese War (1894–95) he invited his old friend Liu Yongfu to assume command of Qing forces in southern Taiwan.

Following China's defeat in the First Sino-Japanese War, Taiwan was ceded to Japan in April 1895 under the Treaty of Shimonoseki. A number of Chinese officials in Taiwan decided to resist the Japanese, and proclaimed Taiwan an independent Republic of Formosa. Tang was inaugurated as the republic's president on May 25, 1895. The republic lasted no longer than the time it took the Japanese to invade and occupy Taiwan. The Japanese invaded northern Taiwan on May 29, 1895 and defeated Chinese forces at Keelung on 3 June.

When the news of the defeat at Keelung reached Taipei on 4 June, the republican leaders promptly abandoned ship. During the night of 4 June Tang Jingsong fled to Tamsui, and from there sailed for the mainland on the evening of 6 June aboard the steamship Arthur. His departure was delayed for a day because of disorder in Tamsui.

After Tang's flight, the republican forces continued to resist the Japanese in Taiwan under the leadership of Liu Yongfu. The republican forces were no match for the Japanese, however, and the republic eventually collapsed with the Japanese occupation of Tainan on 21 October 1895. Like Tang, Liu Yongfu also abandoned his soldiers and fled to the mainland to escape capture.

== Death ==
Tang died in 1903 at his home in Guilin, at the age of 63.

== Notes ==
- This article incorporates text from Christian work: illustrated family newspaper, Volume 58, a publication from 1895, now in the public domain in the United States.

== See also ==
- Japanese Invasion of Taiwan (1895)
