= Liu Yongfu =

Late Qing Dynasty Chinese warlord; Black Flag Army commander (1837–1917)

- 劉永福
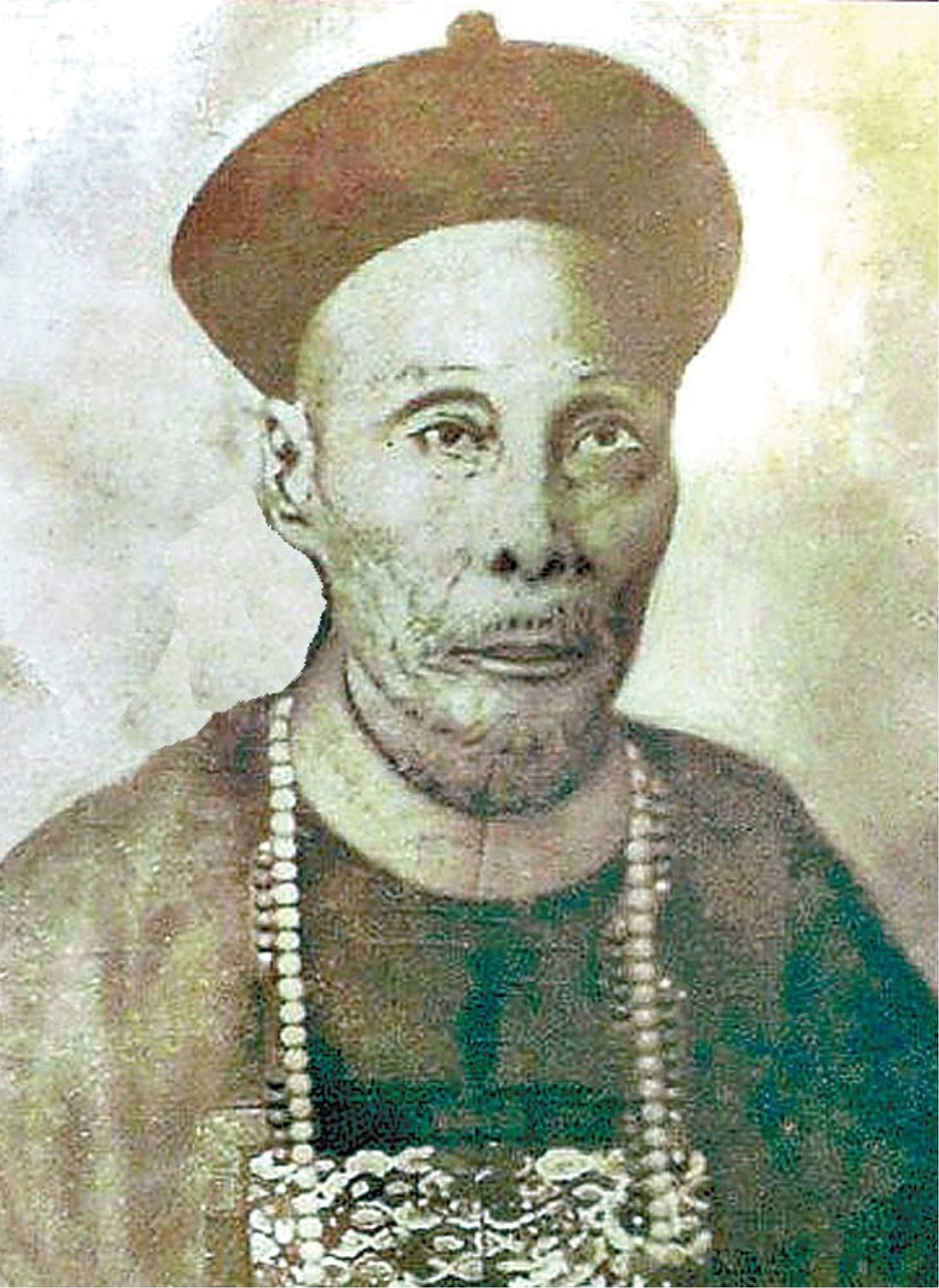
- Liu c. 1885

De Facto President of the Republic of Formosa Commander-in-chief
- In office 5 June 1895 – 21 October 1895
- Preceded by: Tang Jingsong
- Succeeded by: Kabayama Sukenori (as Governor-General of Taiwan)

Personal details
- Born: 10 October 1837 Qinzhou, Guangdong (now Guangxi), Qing dynasty
- Died: 9 January 1917 (aged 79) Qinzhou, Guangdong (now Guangxi), Republic of China

Military service
- Commands: Black Flag Army; Yunnan Army; Formosan Local militias
- Battles/wars: Garnier Expedition: Taiping Rebellion; Tonkin campaign; Battle of Paper Bridge; Battle of Phủ Hoài; Battle of Palan; Sơn Tây Campaign; Capture of Hưng Hóa; Sino-French War; Siege of Tuyên Quang; Battle of Yu Oc; Battle of Hòa Mộc; Japanese invasion of Taiwan (1895); Siege of Tainan

Liu Yongfu (traditional Chinese: 劉永福; ; pinyin: Liú Yǒngfú; Wade–Giles: Liu^{2} Yung^{3}-fu^{2}; Vietnamese: Lưu Vĩnh Phúc) (10 October 1837 – 9 January 1917) was a Chinese bandit, second president of the Republic of Formosa and commander of the celebrated Black Flag Army. Liu won fame as a Chinese patriot fighting against the French Empire in northern Vietnam (Tonkin) in the 1870s and early 1880s. During the Sino-French War (August 1884 – April 1885), he established a close friendship with the Chinese statesman and general Tang Jingsong, and in 1895, he helped Tang organise resistance to the Japanese invasion of Taiwan. He succeeded Tang as the second and last president of the short-lived Republic of Formosa (5 June–21 October 1895).

== Early years ==
Liu Yongfu was born on 10 October 1837, in the town of Qinzhou (Ch'in-chou, 欽州) in southern China, close to the Vietnamese border. Qinzhou, now in Guangxi province, was at that time in the extreme southwest of Guangdong province. The ancestral home of Liu's family was the village of Popai in Guangxi province, and when he was eight his parents moved to Shangsizhou (Shang-ssu-chou, 上思州, modern Shangsi, Guangxi) in Guangxi. Liu's family was poor, living by manual work for others, and was only just able to scrape a living. In 1857, Liu joined a local militia force commanded by Wu Yuanqing (Wu Yuan-ch'ing, 吳元清), who claimed to hold a commission from the Taipings.

The fall of Nanking (capital of Taiping Heavenly kingdom) and the collapse of the Taiping Heavenly Kingdom in 1864 altered Liu's prospects dramatically for the worse. Imperial forces gradually began to reassert their control over southwest China, and it was only a matter of time before they secured Guangxi province. To escape their vengeance, Liu needed to make himself sufficiently powerful to give the Imperial generals pause. His first step was to buy some time by retreating into the mountains of northern Tonkin. In 1868 he abandoned Wu Yuanqing's rebels and crossed into Vietnam with a force of 200 soldiers whose loyalty he could trust. He had dreamed as a youth that he would one day become a famous 'General of the Black Tiger', and christened his tiny band of adventurers the Black Flag Army, Hēiqí Jūn (hei-ch'i chun, 黑旗軍). The Black Flags marched slowly through northern Tonkin, recruiting men to their standard as they went, and eventually set up camp just outside Sơn Tây, on the northern bank of the Red River.

The mountain regions of western Tonkin were inhabited by minority tribesmen who did not acknowledge the writ of the Vietnamese government, and these montagnards resented the arrival of the Black Flag Army on Vietnamese soil. Fearing that Liu might eventually pose a threat to their own ascendancy in the area, they declared their intention of attacking the intruders. Liu struck first, however, and defeated a far stronger army of montagnards in a surprise attack. The short conflict enabled Liu to come to an early arrangement with the Vietnamese authorities, who had observed the performance of the Black Flag Army with great interest. The Vietnamese government, reasoning that it would be difficult to dislodge Liu from its territory and that he might also be a useful ally against the refractory montagnards, co-opted Liu into its service in 1869 and gave him military rank in the Vietnamese army. Provided that he continued to act in accordance with his technical status as a Vietnamese military governor, the Vietnamese authorities promised not to trouble the Black Flag leader.

== Black Flags versus Yellow Flags ==
Having secured his base, Liu began to extend his ambitions. Ultimately, his intention was to carve out a small empire of his own controlling the upper course of the Red River. His first target was the border town of Lào Cai, which had recently been occupied by a force of Cantonese bandits under the command of He Junchang (Ho Chun-ch'ang, 何均昌). His band was allied with the Yellow Flag Army, a force established by Huang Chongying (Huang Ch'ung-ying, 黃崇英) on the model of the Black Flag Army and about three times its size. Liu's attempt on Lào Cai brought him into conflict with the Yellow Flags. Troops of both armies moved warily into the town while their leaders negotiated insincerely. Finally the Yellow Flags launched a surprise attack on the Black Flags, first setting off a mine in an unsuccessful attempt to kill the Black Flag leader. However, despite their superior numbers, they were defeated and driven from Lào Cai. The town remained in the hands of the Black Flags until 1885, and became Liu's main stronghold.

In 1869, having conciliated the Vietnamese, Liu also won favour with the Chinese authorities by committing the Black Flag Army to a Chinese punitive campaign against the Yellow Flags, which gave him the opportunity to cripple this rival bandit army. The Chinese expedition was commanded by the veteran general Feng Zicai, who would later win fame during the Sino-French War (August 1884 – April 1885) by defeating a French column at the Battle of Zhennan Pass (24 March 1885). In one particular military exploit, known as 'the storming of the thirteen passes', Liu's Black Flags fought their way through the mountains and attacked Huang Chongying's headquarters at Hayang, a town on the Clear River near the border with Yunnan, forcing the Yellow Flag leader to take refuge with his montagnard allies. Although the Chinese and Black Flags failed to annihilate the Yellow Flags, they taught them a severe lesson, and Feng rewarded Liu for his help by offering him an honorary commission in the Chinese army.

In the next few years, Liu Yongfu established a profitable protection racket on commerce on the Red River between Sơn Tây and Lào Cai. Traders were taxed at the rate of 10% of the value of their goods. The profits that accrued from this extortion were so great that Liu's army swelled in numbers during the 1870s, attracting to its ranks adventurers from all over the world. Although most of the soldiers were Chinese, many of the junior officers were Americans or European soldiers of fortune, some of whom had seen action in the Taiping Rebellion, and Liu used their expertise to transform the Black Flag Army into a formidable fighting force. Liu commanded 7,000 black flag soldiers from Guangdong and Guangxi around Tonkin.

== Liu Yongfu and Francis Garnier ==
In 1873, the Vietnamese government enlisted the help of Liu's Black Flag Army to defeat the first French attempt to conquer Tonkin, led by the naval lieutenant Francis Garnier. On 21 December 1873 Liu Yongfu and around 600 Black Flags, marching beneath an enormous black banner, approached the west gate of Hanoi. A large Vietnamese army followed in their wake. Garnier began shelling the Black Flags with a field piece mounted above the gate, and when they began to fall back led a party of 18 French marine infantrymen out of the city to chase them away. The attack failed, and Garnier, leading three men uphill in a bayonet attack on a party of Black Flags, was speared to death by several Black Flag soldiers after stumbling in a watercourse. The youthful enseigne de vaisseau Adrien-Paul Balny d'Avricourt led an equally small column out of the citadel to support Garnier, but he also died leading his men. Three French soldiers also were killed in these sorties, and the others fled back to the citadel after their officers fell. Garnier's death ended the first French adventure in Tonkin.

== Liu Yongfu and Henri Rivière ==
In April 1882, the French naval captain Henri Rivière captured the citadel of Hanoi, again disclosing French colonial ambitions in Tonkin and alarming the Vietnamese and Chinese governments. In April 1883, in the wake of Rivière's capture of Nam Định (27 March), the Chinese and Vietnamese were again able to enlist the support of Liu Yongfu and the Black Flag Army against the French in Tonkin.

On 10 May 1883 Liu Yongfu challenged the French to battle in a taunting message widely placarded on the walls of Hanoi:

The valiant warrior Liu, general and military governor of the three provinces, has decided to wage war. He makes this proclamation to the French bandits: Everyone knows you are thieves. Other nations despise you. Whenever you come to a country, you claim that you have come to preach the faith, but you really wish to stir up the inhabitants with false rumours. You claim that you have come to trade, but in fact you are plotting to take over the country. You act like wild animals. You are as fierce as tigers and wolves. Ever since you came to Vietnam, you have seized cities and killed governors. Your crimes are as numerous as the hairs on the head. You have taken over the customs and seized the revenues. This crime deserves death. The inhabitants have been reduced to misery, and the country is nearly ruined. God and man both loathe you. Heaven and earth both reject you. I have now been ordered to wage war. My three armies are massed like clouds. My rifles and cannon are as many as the trees of the forest. We are eager to attack you in your devil’s den and to suppress all disloyal subjects. But the country’s welfare weighs heavily with me. I cannot bear to turn Hanoi into a battlefield, in case I ruin its merchants and people. So I am first making this proclamation: You French bandits, if you think you are strong enough, send your rabble of soldiers to Phủ Hoài to fight in the open field with my tiger warriors, and then we will see who is the strongest. If you are afraid to come, cut off the heads of your chief men and present them to me. Then give back the cities you have taken. I am a merciful commander, and I will let you miserable ants live. But if you delay, my army will take your city and kill you all, and not even a blade of grass will mark where you stood. You must choose between happiness and disaster. Life is but a step away from death. Mark my words well.

«雄威大將軍兼署三宣提督劉，爲懸示決戰事，照你法匪，素稱巨寇，爲國所恥。每到他國，假稱傳道，實則蠱惑村愚，淫慾縱橫。借名通商，實則陰謀土地。行則譬 如禽獸，心則竟似虎狼。自抵越南，陷城戕官，罪難了發，佔關奪稅，惡不勝誅。以致民不聊生，國幾窮窘，神民共怒，天地難容。本將軍奉命討賊，三軍雲集，槍 炮如林，直討爾鬼祟，掃清醜類。第國家之大事，不忍以河內而作戰場，唯恐波及於商民，爲此先行懸示。爾法匪既稱本領，率烏合之衆，與我虎旅之師在懷德府屬 曠野之地以作戰場，兩軍相對，以決雌雄。倘爾畏懼不來，即宜自斬爾等統轄之首遞來獻納，退還各處城池，本將軍好生之德，留你蚊蟲。倘若遲疑不決，一旦兵臨 城下，寸草不留，禍福尤關，死生在即，爾等熟思之。切切特示！»

The French had no option but to respond to so stark a challenge. On 19 May, Rivière marched out of Hanoi to attack the Black Flags. His small force (around 450 men) advanced without proper precautions, and blundered into a well-prepared Black Flag ambush at Paper Bridge (Pont de Papier), a few miles to the west of Hanoi. In the Battle of Paper Bridge, the French were enveloped on both wings, and were only with difficulty able to regroup and fall back to Hanoi. Like Francis Garnier, ten years earlier, Rivière was killed in the battle. Liu had now taken the scalps of two French naval commanders in remarkably similar circumstances.

== Sơn Tây, Bắc Ninh and Hưng Hóa ==
Liu began an unconventional campaign against the French, with success. Liu fought two further actions against the French in the autumn of 1883, the Battle of Phủ Hoài (15 August 1883) and the Battle of Palan (1 September 1883). The Black Flag Army was mauled in both these battles, but was not seriously damaged as a fighting force. In December 1883, however, Liu Yongfu suffered a major defeat at the hands of Admiral Amédée Courbet in the Sơn Tây Campaign. Despite fighting with fanatical courage in the engagements at Phù Sa on 14 December and Sơn Tây on 16 December, the Black Flags were unable to prevent the French from storming Sơn Tây. Although there were also Chinese and Vietnamese contingents at Sơn Tây, the Black Flag Army bore the brunt of the fighting, and took very heavy casualties.

Angered that his Chinese and Vietnamese allies had done little to support the Black Flag Army at Sơn Tây, Liu stood on the sidelines during the Bắc Ninh Campaign (March 1884). After the French capture of Bắc Ninh, Liu retreated with the Black Flag Army to Hưng Hóa. In April 1884 the French advanced on Hưng Hóa with both brigades of the Tonkin Expeditionary Corps. The Black Flags had thrown up an impressive series of fortifications around the town, but General Charles-Théodore Millot, the French commander-in-chief, took it without a single French casualty. While General François de Négrier's 2nd Brigade pinned the Black Flags frontally and subjected Hưng Hóa to a ferocious artillery bombardment from the Trung Xa heights, General Louis Brière de l'Isle's 1st Brigade made a flank march to the west to cut Liu's line of retreat. On the evening of 11 April, seeing Brière de l'Isle's Turcos and marine infantry emerging behind their flank at Xuân Đông, the Black Flags evacuated Hưng Hóa before they were trapped inside it. They set alight the remaining buildings before they left, and on the following morning the French found the town completely abandoned.

Liu now fell back up the Red River to Thanh Quan, only a few days march from the frontier town of Lào Cai. He was now in a position to retreat into China if the French pursued him. Several hundred Black Flag soldiers, demoralised by the ease with which Courbet and Millot had defeated the Black Flag Army, surrendered to the French in the summer of 1884. One of Millot's final achievements was to advance up the Lô River and throw the Black Flag Army out of Tuyên Quang in the first week of June, again without a single French casualty. If the French had seriously pursued Liu Yongfu after the capture of Tuyên Quang, the Black Flags would probably have been driven from Tonkin there and then. But French attention was diverted by the sudden crisis with China provoked by the Bắc Lệ ambush (23 June 1884), and during the eventful summer of 1884 the Black Flags were left to lick their wounds.

== Tuyên Quang and Hòa Mộc ==
Liu's fortunes were transformed by the outbreak of the Sino-French War in August 1884. The Empress Dowager Cixi responded to the news of the destruction of China's Fujian Fleet at the Battle of Fuzhou (23 August 1884) by ordering her generals to invade Tonkin to throw the French out of Hanoi. Tang Jingsong, the commander of the Yunnan Army, knew that Liu's services would be invaluable in the war with France. Although Liu had bitter memories of his previous service as an ally of China, he respected Tang (the only Chinese commander to have contributed troops to the defence of Sơn Tây), and agreed to take part with the Black Flag Army in the forthcoming campaign. Appointed a divisional general in the Yunnan Army, Liu helped the Chinese forces put pressure on Hưng Hóa and the isolated French posts of Phủ Doãn and Tuyên Quang during the autumn of 1884. In the winter and spring of 1885 he commanded 3,000 soldiers of the Black Flag Army during the Siege of Tuyên Quang. At the Battle of Hòa Mộc (2 March 1885), the Black Flag Army inflicted heavy casualties on a French column marching to the relief of Tuyên Quang.

One of the conditions of the peace treaty between France and China that ended the Sino-French War was that Liu Yongfu and the Black Flag Army should leave Tonkin. By the end of the war, Liu had only around 2,000 troops under his command and was in no position to resist pressure from Tang Jingsong and the other commanders of the Yunnan Army to remove the Black Flag Army. Liu crossed into China with some of his most loyal followers, but the bulk of the Black Flag Army was disbanded on Tonkinese soil in the summer of 1885. Unpaid for months and still in possession of their rifles, most of the unwanted Black Flag soldiers immediately took to banditry. It took months for the French to reduce them, and the route between Hưng Hóa and the border town of Lào Cai was only secured in February 1886. Meanwhile, the Qing government rewarded Liu Yongfu for his services in the Sino-French War with a minor military appointment in Guangdong province.

Liu's Black Flag forces continued to harass and fight the French in Tonkin after the end of the Sino-French War.

== Defence of the Republic of Formosa ==
In 1895, under the Treaty of Shimonoseki which ended the First Sino-Japanese War, Taiwan was ceded by China to Japan. The Taiwanese attempted to resist the Japanese occupation, and a short-lived Republic of Formosa was declared by the Chinese governor Tang Jingsong on 25 May 1895. Tang became president of the new republic, and Liu Yongfu was made a brigadier general and given command of resistance forces in southern Taiwan. Ten days after declaring independence Tang Jingsong fled to Mainland China, and Liu replaced him as head of government (though he did not, as is often claimed, succeed to the presidency). At the end of May 1895 Japanese forces landed near Keelung, on the northern coast of Taiwan, and proceeded to conquer the island. Between June and August the Japanese defeated the Formosan forces in northern and central Taiwan, and in October 1895 three Japanese columns advanced on Tainan, sweeping aside Liu's forces. On 20 October 1895 Liu fled to the mainland aboard the British-flagged merchant ship SS Thales with the Japanese cruiser Yaeyama in close pursuit. Yaeyama caught Thales in international waters outside of Amoy, but her boarding party was unable to apprehend Liu, who was disguised as a coolie. The incident provoked a diplomatic protest from the United Kingdom and resulted in an official apology by the Japanese government. On 21 October Tainan capitulated to the Japanese. The collapse of Formosan resistance inaugurated five decades of Japanese rule in Taiwan.

== Final years ==
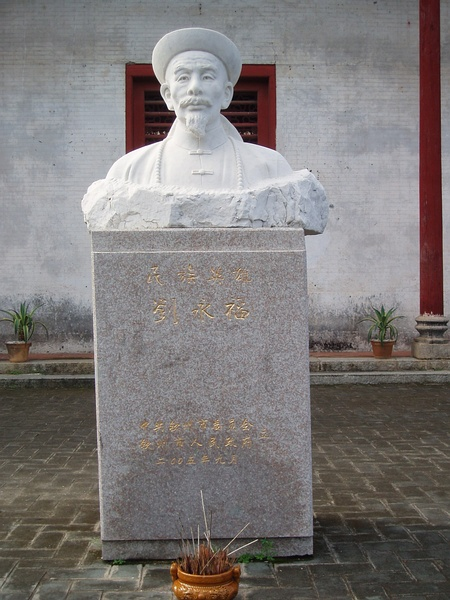
Statue of Liu Yongfu inside former residence.

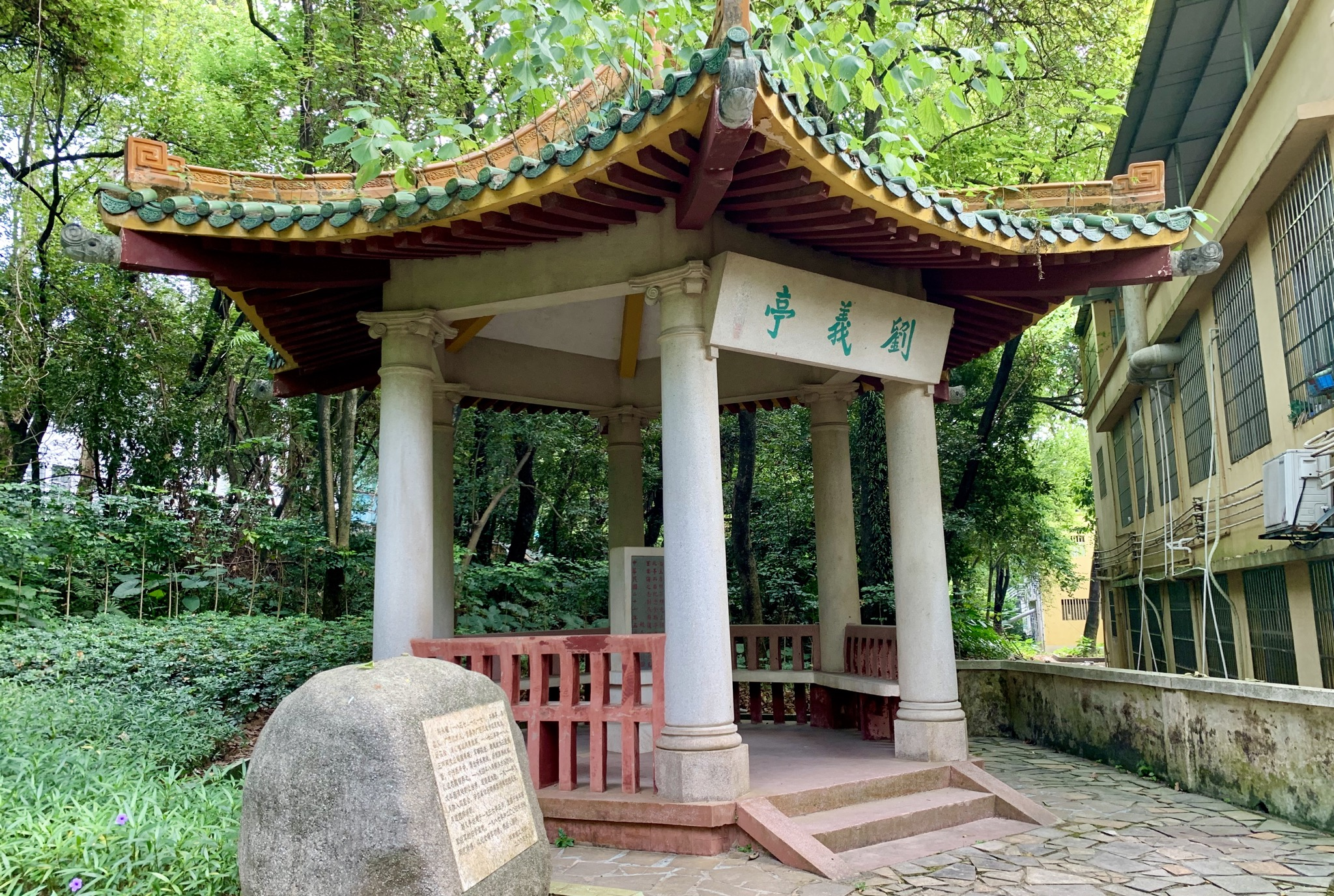
Liu Yiting Pavilion, built in Liu Yongfu's honor.

Liu Yongfu outlived the Qing dynasty, and survived into the second decade of the twentieth century after 1911 Revolution, his reputation growing with the passing years:

He continued until the closing years of the dynasty in the employment of the Kwangtung provincial administration, and is said to have been a notable suppressor of bandits and a pacifier of clan feuds, those twin curses of the south China countryside. The advent of the Republic in 1912 found him in retirement, listening with interest to the news of public affairs as others related it to him from the papers, for he himself never learned to read. Most of the time, though, his mind dwelt in the past. He would take out Garnier’s watch and show the picture of the young wife inside the cover. He would tell of his challenge to Rivière and describe the battle at Paper Bridge. But he soon wearied of the incomprehensible foreign devils, and turned instead to what for him had been beyond comparison the most serious business of his life. The talk would then be all of the Black and Yellow Flags, and of the long years of feuds and hatreds in the steaming malarial jungle and on the silent reaches of the great river. His published memoirs, for his reminiscences were reverently taken down in writing, have as their main theme the story of this interminable vendetta between expatriate Chinese. But when he died, in January 1917, it was as the scourge of a formidable foreign enemy, the hero whose achievements were nullified by the cowardice of his own government, that he was mourned by his countrymen, and that is the way they still remember him.

== Legacy ==
The Yongfu Road and Yongfu Elementary School in West Central District, Tainan City, Taiwan, are named after Liu Yongfu.

Parts of the Wushan Campus of South China University of Technology (SCUT) in Guangzhou were once the headquarters of the Black Flag Army. The campus features the ruins of Liu Yongfu’s military outpost and a watchtower, as well as the Liu Yiting Pavilion, built in his honor.

== Notes ==
- This article incorporates text from China: A collection of correspondence and papers relating to Chinese affairs, by Great Britain. Foreign Office, a publication from 1885, now in the public domain in the United States.
