= Marc-Edmond Dominé =

French Army officer

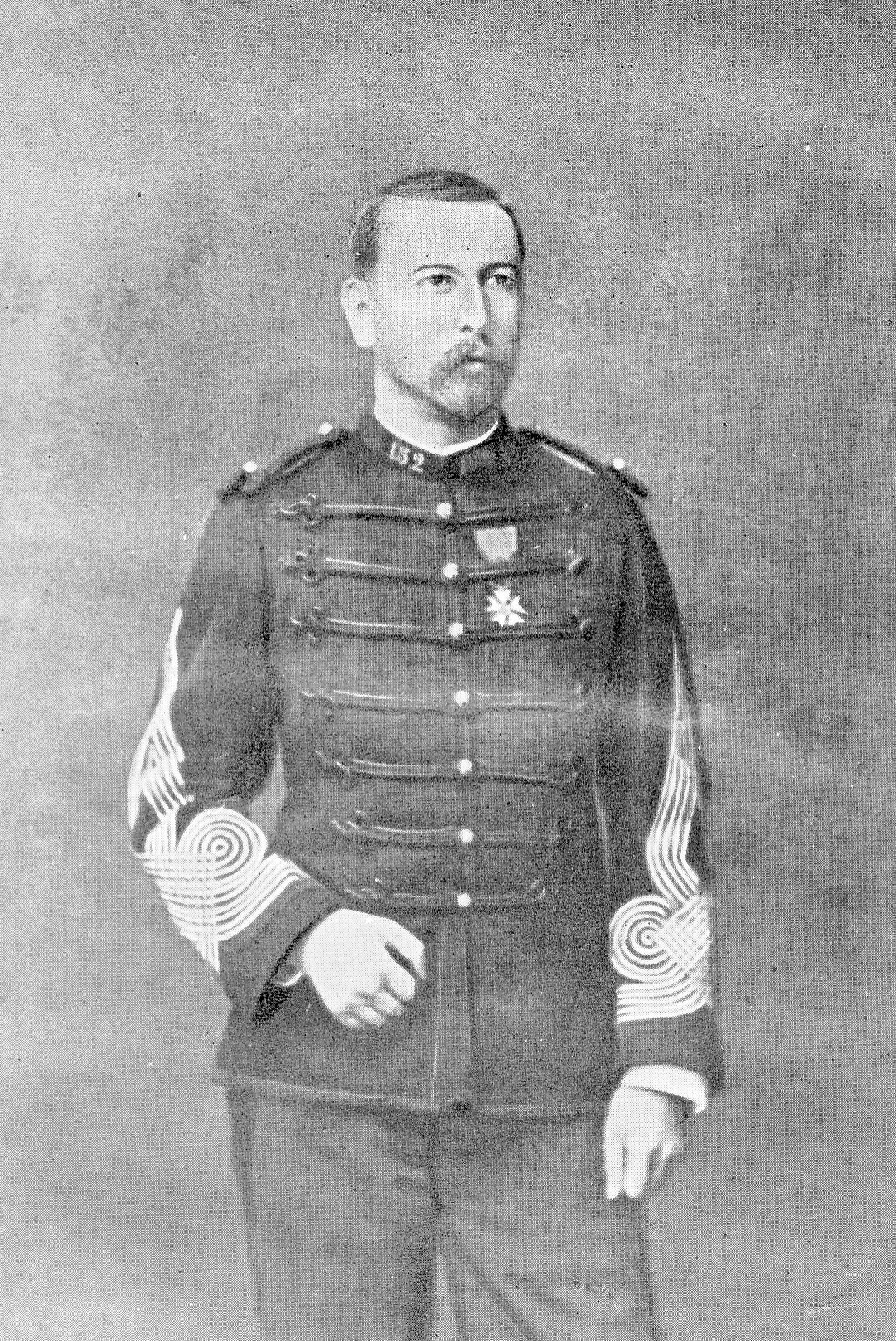
- Born: July 22, 1848; Vitry-le-François, France
- Died: June 28, 1921 (aged 72); Vertus, France
- Education: École spéciale militaire de Saint-Cyr; École Militaire
- Military career
- Allegiance: France
- Branch: (France) French Army
- Service years: 1868–1892
- Rank: Colonel
- Conflicts: Franco-Prussian War; Battle of Beaune-la-Rolande; Sino-French War; Siege of Tuyên Quang
- Awards: Officer of the Legion of Honor

Marc-Edmond Dominé (21 June 1848 – 28 June 1921) was a French Army officer who served in the Franco-Prussian War, the Sino-French War, and in the various territories of the French colonial empire.

== Early life ==
Marc-Edmond Domine was admitted to the École spéciale militaire de Saint-Cyr in 1866.

== Early Military Career ==
In October 1868, following his graduation from the École spéciale militaire de Saint-Cyr, Dominé selected the infantry as his preferred branch of the French Army. Dominé was deployed to Algeria where he was wounded in a skirmish; Dominé was appointed a Chevalier of the Legion of Honor for his conduct under fire. During the Franco-Prussian War, he was wounded a second time at the Battle of Beaune-la-Rolande.

During the Tonkin Campaign Dominé led the French forces during the Siege of Tuyên Quang. With a force of 619 men of the Tonkinese Rifles, French Foreign Legion and assorted others he held the post from the end of November 1884 until March 1885, against superior Black Flag Army and Chinese forces.
