= Siege of Tuyên Quang =

Important battle of the Sino-French War (Nov 1884 - March 1885)

Coordinates: 21.8170°N 105.2170°E

- Part of the Sino-French War, Tonkin Campaign
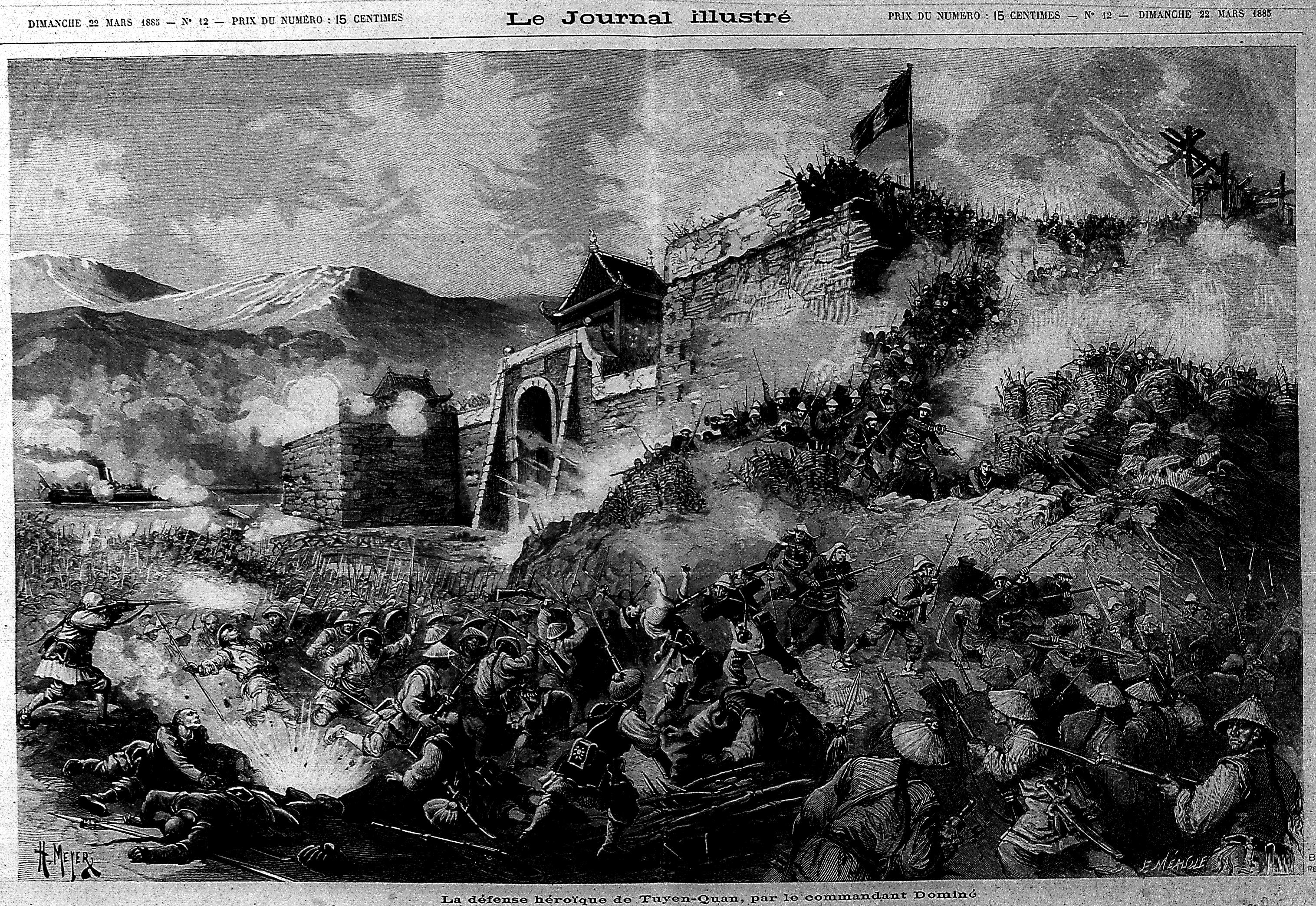
Date	24 November 1884 – 3 March 1885
Location	Tuyên Quang, Northern Vietnam
Result	French victory

Belligerents
France	Qing dynasty Black Flag Army

Commanders and leaders
(France) Marc-Edmond Dominé	(Qing dynasty) Tang Jingsong; Liu Yongfu

Strength
619 (Note: 390 men were Foreign Legion)	9,000

Casualties and losses
50 dead 224 wounded	Unknown

The siege of Tuyên Quang was an important confrontation between the French and the Chinese armies in Tonkin (northern Vietnam) during the Sino-French War (August 1884 – April 1885). A French garrison of 619 men, including two companies of the French Foreign Legion, successfully defended the French post of Tuyên Quang against vastly outnumbering Chinese forces in a four-month siege from 24 November 1884 to 3 March 1885. 'Tuyên Quang 1885' remains one of the Legion's proudest battle honours.

== Background ==
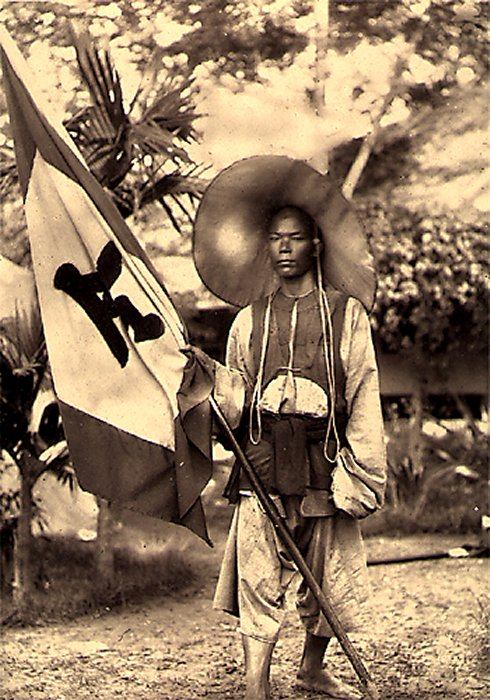
Black Flag soldier

The French installed a post at Tuyên Quang in June 1884, in the wake of their capture of Hung Hoa and Thai Nguyen. Tuyên Quang, an isolated settlement on the Clear River, was the most westerly French outpost in Tonkin, and was 80 kilometres (50 mi) from the nearest French post at Phu Doan. During the summer and autumn of 1884 it was garrisoned by two companies of the 1st Battalion, 1st Foreign Legion Regiment (Captains Chmitelin and Broussier), under the command of chef de bataillon Frauger. The outbreak of the Sino-French War on 23 August 1884 exposed the post to attack by Tang Jingsong's Yunnan Army and Liu Yongfu's Black Flags. Supply difficulties delayed the Chinese concentration around Tuyên Quang, but advance elements of the Yunnan Army began to harass the post in October 1884, and Frauger's garrison had to fight off a number of nuisance attacks by the Chinese. Malaria had also taken a heavy toll of Frauger's men, and by the end of October 170 men out of the garrison's total strength of 550 men were unfit for duty.

In November 1884 General Louis Brière de l'Isle, the commander of the Tonkin Expeditionary Corps, took steps to resupply and reinforce Hung Hoa, Thai Nguyen and Tuyên Quang. On 19 November a column making for Tuyên Quang under the command of Lieutenant-Colonel Jacques Duchesne was ambushed in the Yu Oc gorge by the Black Flags but was able to fight its way through to the beleaguered post. Frauger and his men were relieved, and replaced by a fresh garrison of 400 legionnaires and 160 Tonkinese riflemen under the command of chef de bataillon Marc-Edmond Dominé of the 2nd African Light Infantry Battalion. Duchesne left Tuyên Quang on 23 November, and on the following day Dominé formally declared Tuyên Quang to be in a state of siege. The siege of Tuyên Quang would last for just over four months.

== Forces involved ==
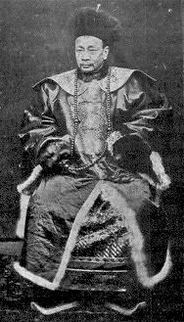
Tang Jingsong (1841–1903), the commander of the Yunnan Army in the siege of Tuyên Quang

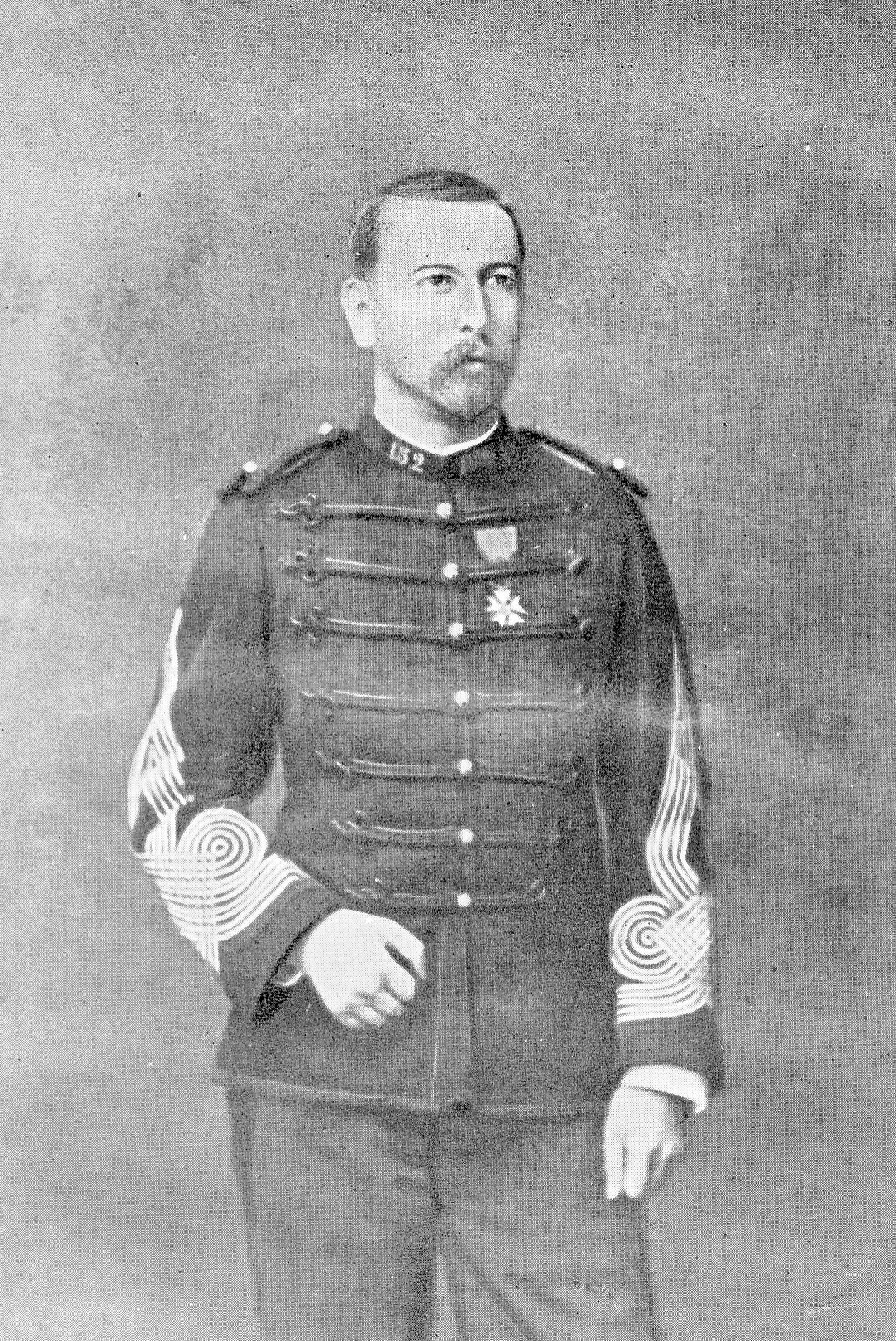
Chef de bataillon Marc-Edmond Dominé (1848–1920), the commander of the Tuyên Quang garrison

The new garrison of Tuyên Quang, just under 630 men strong, consisted of two companies of the 1st Battalion, 1st Foreign Legion Regiment (Captains de Borelli and Moulinay) under the overall command of Captain Cattelin, a company of Tonkinese riflemen under the command of the French marine infantry officer Captain Dia, a scratch battery of six light cannon (Lieutenant Derappe) and small engineering and field hospital detachments. The garrison was supported by the Farcy gunboat Mitrailleuse (enseigne de vaisseau Senes), at anchor in the Clear River close to the French post.

The Chinese army besieging Tuyên Quang was under the overall command of Tang Jingsong (唐景崧). The Chinese forces consisted of 9,000 men of the Yunnan Army and 3,000 men of Liu Yongfu's Black Flag Army. The Yunnan Army forces were divided into two divisions, commanded by Tang's lieutenants Ding Huai (Ting Huai, 丁槐) and He Xiulin (Ho Hsiu-lin, 何秀林).

== The fortress of Tuyên Quang ==
The French fortress at Tuyên Quang was typical of the small, remote outposts of France's colonial empire. Lying on the western bank of the Clear River next to the Tonkinese village of Tuyên Quang, it consisted of a square masonry citadel, each of whose walls was 300 yards long. Inside the citadel's perimeter were several barrack buildings, a lake and a large earthen mound in the shape of a sugar loaf. This hill, which looked just like a natural formation, took the place at Tuyên Quang of the tower traditionally found in Tonkinese citadels.

The citadel was overlooked by a number of wooded hills, which the Chinese were bound to occupy. There was little Dominé could do to stop Chinese snipers from using these hills to fire down into the citadel, but he could at least delay the main enemy assault by building outworks to keep the Chinese at a respectable distance from the main perimeter. Accordingly, he had a blockhouse built on a hill 300 metres (1,000 ft) to the south of the citadel, which was occupied by a strong force of legionnaires. He also built a separate defensive perimeter to the southeast of Tuyên Quang which was occupied by Captain Dia and his company of Tonkinese riflemen. This position, centred on a fortified pagoda on the river bank, was christened 'Little Gibraltar'. These positions could be evacuated if necessary, and as long as they held they would severely limit the pressure the Chinese could exert on the fortress itself.

== The investment ==
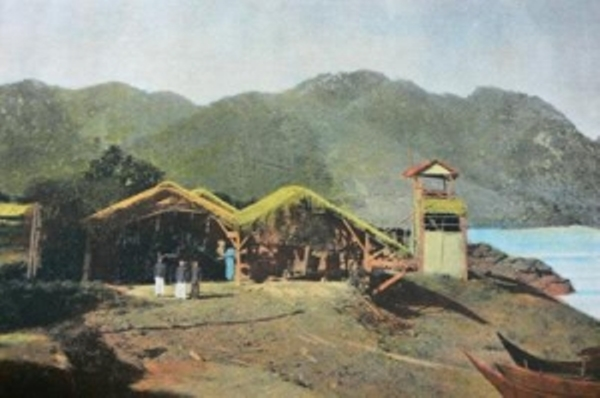
The French post at Tuyên Quang: 'a small outpost overlooked from all sides'

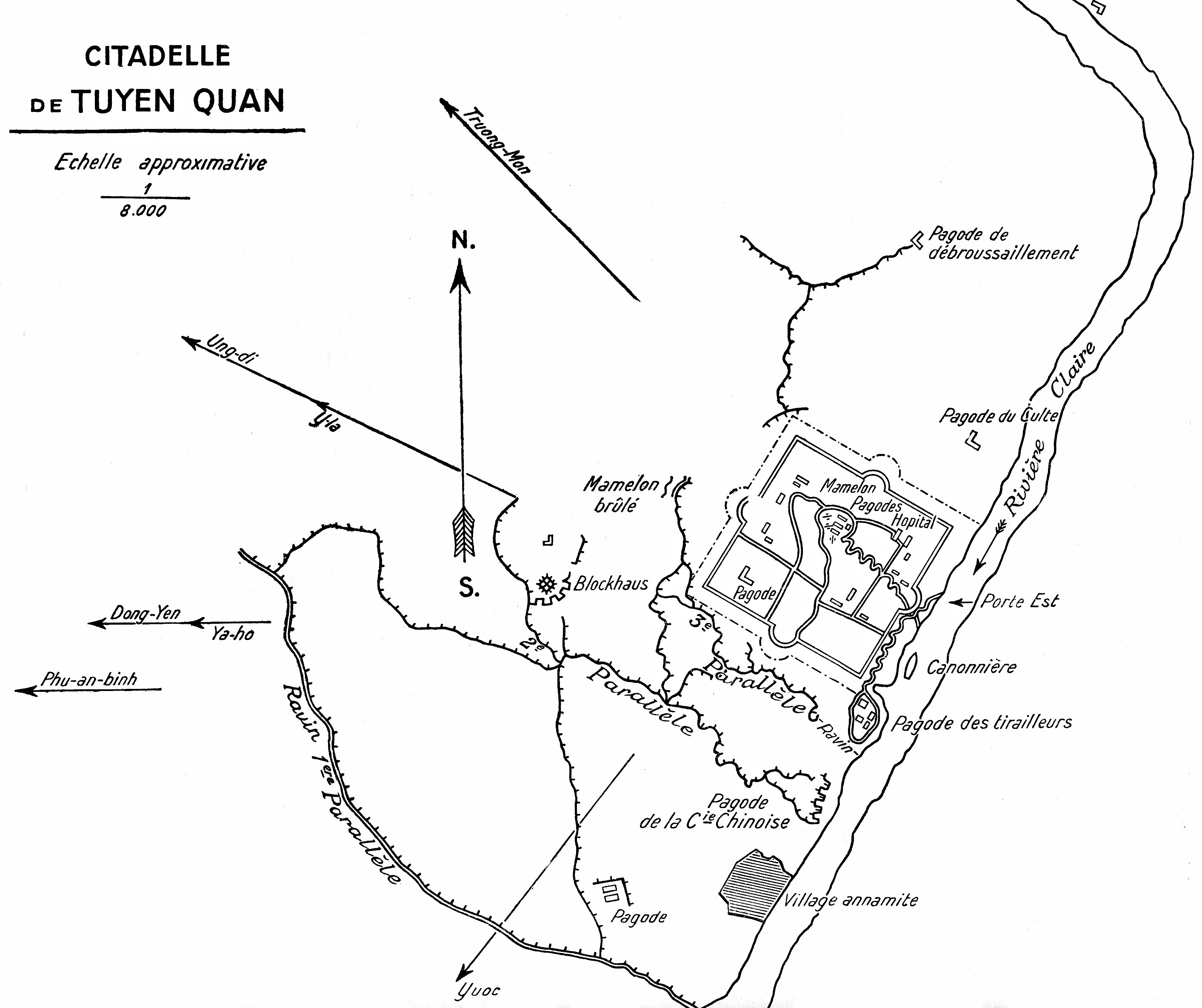
Map of the siege of Tuyên Quang

In November 1884 the Yunnan Army gradually advanced down the Red River from Lao Cai towards Tuyên Quang, building a chain of entrenched camps at Pho En, Man Lanh, Ao Loc, Van Kieng and Son Long. In December the Chinese built three enormous fortified camps as bases for the siege of Tuyên Quang, at Thanh Quan, Ca Lanh and Phu An Binh. For much of this period the only enemy troops around Tuyên Quang were Liu Yongfu's Black Flags (3,000 men) and an advance guard of the Yunnan Army under Tang Jingsong's personal command (2,000 men). The Chinese investment of the French post only began to bite in the second half of December. By the beginning of January 1885 the Chinese had 4,000 men facing the French at Tuyên Quang, 5,000 men protecting their long and vulnerable supply line back to Lao Cai, and 3,000 men deployed between Tuyên Quang and Phu Doan, who were busy fortifying a strong blocking position at Hoa Moc. The besiegers gradually drew their lines closely around the French post at Tuyên Quang, occupying the villages of Phu An Binh, Dong Yen and Ya Ho to the west of the fortress and Yla, Ung Di and Truong Mu to the northwest.

== The siege ==
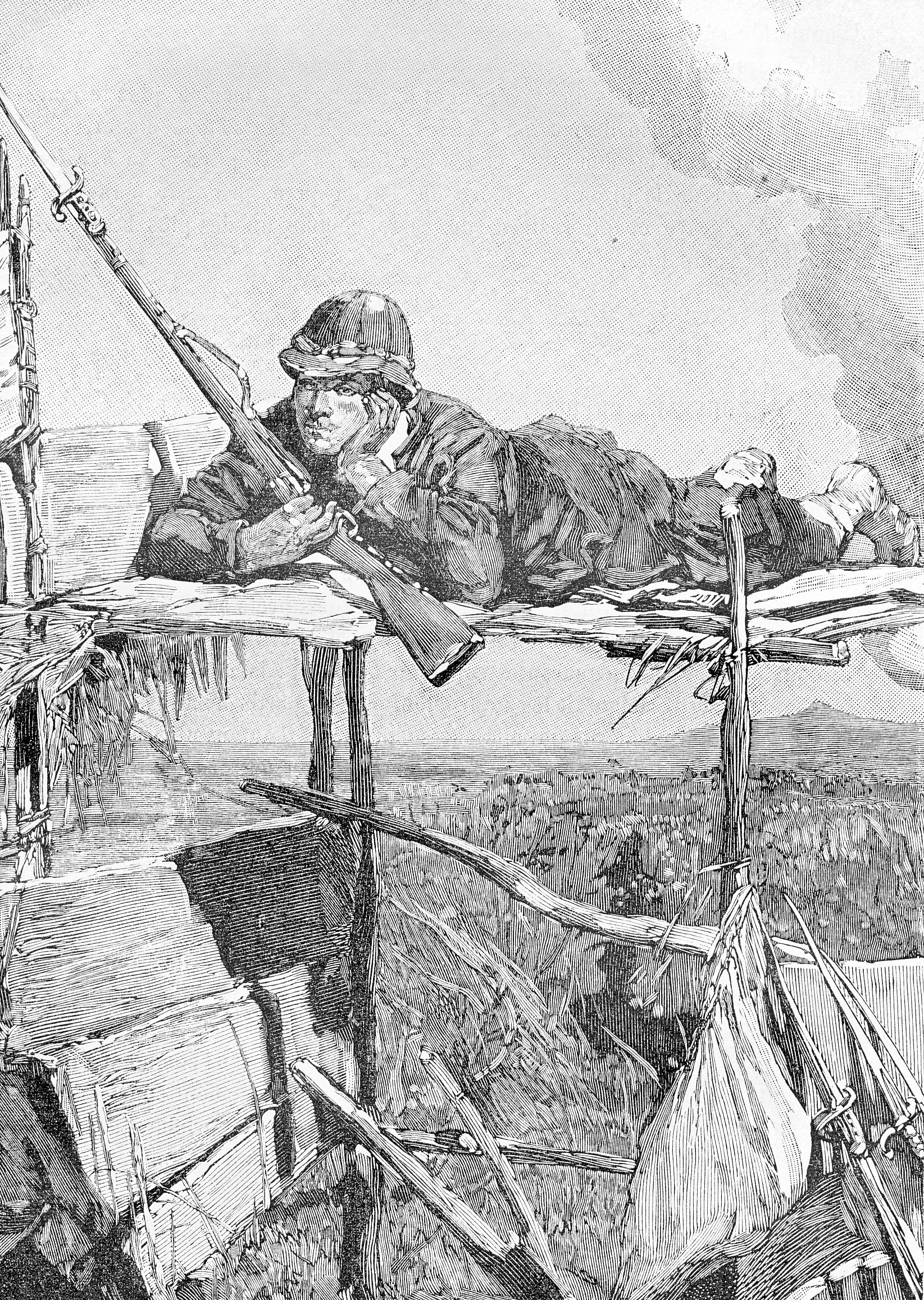
A Legion sniper at Tuyên Quang

On 31 December 1884 the Chinese launched an initial attack, which was repelled with losses. They attacked again on 10 January and 26 January 1885, but with no more success. But at the same time they had diverted more than 1,000 men to work on digging saps in order to approach the walls of the fortress from the southwest and the north simultaneously. On 27 January their trenches were less than 1,000 metres (3,300 ft) from the French walls, and they began to sap towards the blockhouse. As its communications with the citadel were threatened, the blockhouse had to be abandoned on 30 January. The guns which Dominé had at his disposal were of too low a calibre to do any serious damage to the enemy trenches.

The Chinese converted the abandoned French blockhouse into a fortified position for a battery of four cannon and drew their encirclement of the French post closer. From then on, attacks were made on the French positions almost daily and the defenders were subjected to an almost continual barrage of cannon, mortar and rifle fire from all sides. The French did what they could to respond. Dominé posted 25 crack Legion marksmen on the citadel's watchtowers with orders to fire at Chinese soldiers working as labourers on the approach saps in order to disrupt the progress of the Chinese siege works. The Legion snipers normally took nine or ten victims a day, and by the end of the siege estimated that they had accounted for over 700 enemy soldiers. Dominé occasionally brought his own artillery into play, and the gunboat Mitrailleuse harassed the Chinese positions on the Clear River with Hotchkiss fire. The Chinese responded by deploying their own snipers on hill positions around the French post. They rarely hit their targets, but the weight of plunging fire they were able to bring to bear severely restricted movement inside the fortress.

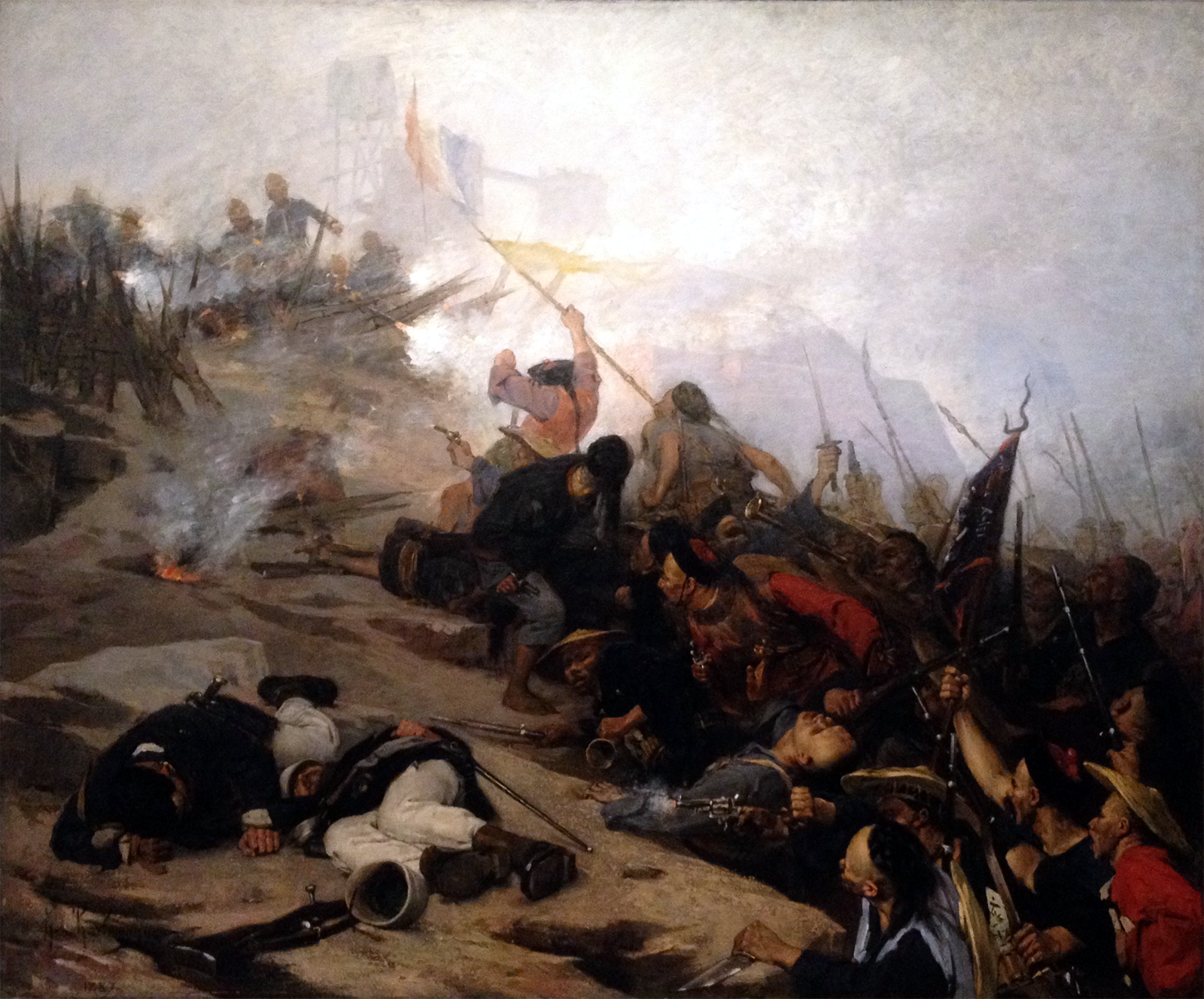
The fourth Chinese assault on the Tuyên Quang perimeter, 22 February 1885

Having successfully forced the French from the outlying blockhouse by siege tactics, the Chinese sapped relentlessly towards the French perimeter wall. If they could mine the walls and collapse sections of the defence perimeter, they could bring their superior numbers to bear by assaulting the French through open breaches. The Chinese intentions were obvious, and the French engineering sergeant Jules Bobillot did his best to frustrate them. Both the French and the Chinese feverishly dug galleries and counter-galleries. On 11 February a pick-axe blow severed the membrane which separated a French from a Chinese miner, and an underground revolver fight took place. The French tried vainly to flood the Chinese saps, which were lower than theirs. On the evening of 12 February the first Chinese mine was exploded beneath the perimeter wall, but its effect was weakened by the counter-galleries and a subsequent Chinese assault was repelled with heavy losses.

Another mine, which exploded on 13 February, made a 15-metre (50 ft) breach in the southwest wall of the citadel. Captain Moulinay rushed to the threatened point with his company, halted an enemy attack, and threw the assailants back to their forward trenches. The body of a French legionnaire was thrown onto the enemy parapets by the force of the explosion, and on the following night Corporal Beulin of the Legion took a party of three soldiers to go out into no-man's-land and recover it.

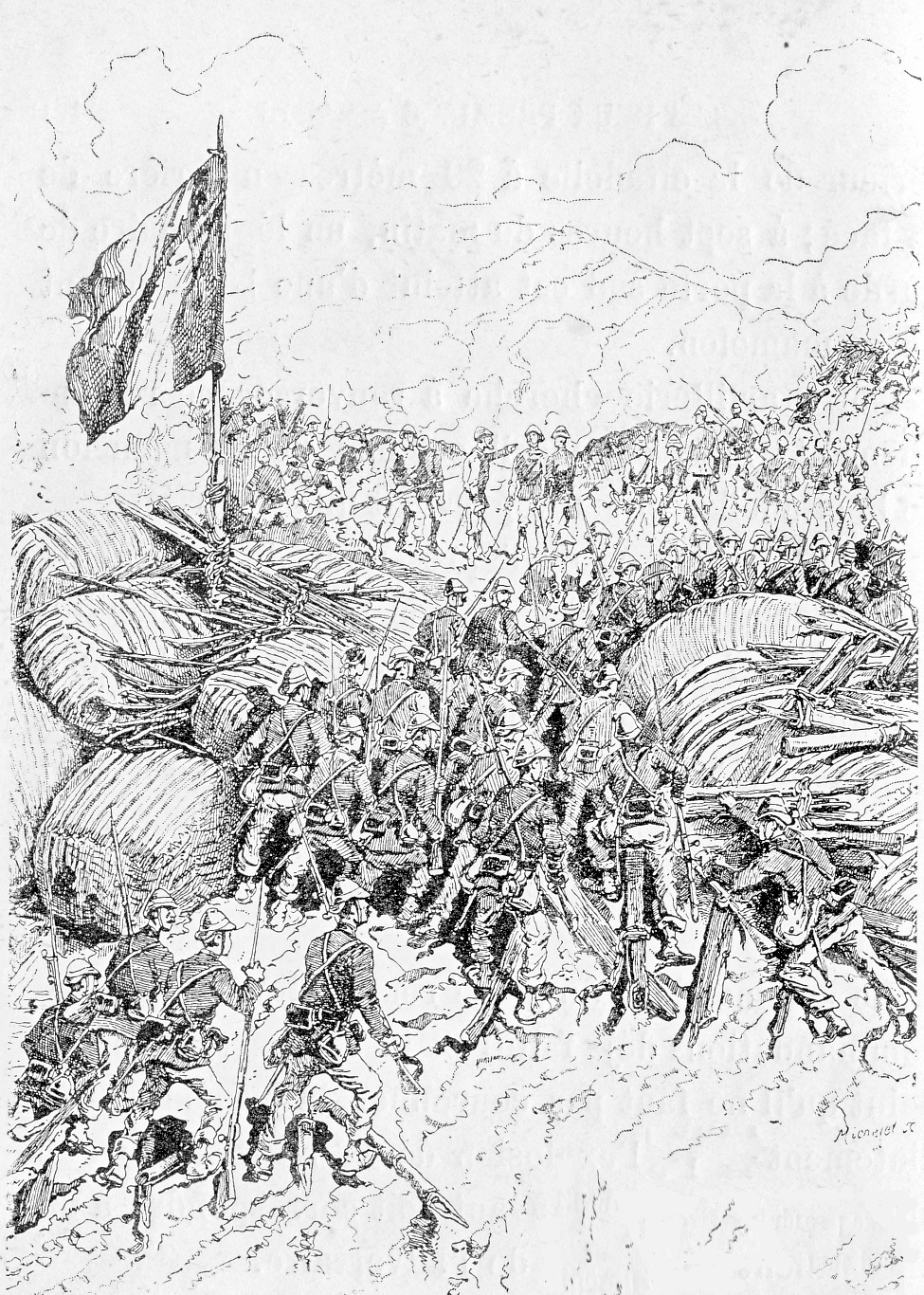
Legionnaires of the Tuyên Quang garrison advance to crown the breach in the perimeter wall, 22 February 1885

On 17 February the Chinese brought up fresh guns, and the bombardment (cannon and mortar fire by night, rifle fire by day) now continued without a pause. Most of the buildings became uninhabitable, and the French had to abandon them and live in foxholes. Supplies of cigarettes had by now run out, trying the defenders' nerves still further. Sleep became increasingly difficult, and in daytime most French soldiers not on duty at the perimeter wall were busy digging additional inner defences. Dominé had a redoubt built in the southeast corner of the fortress, where a final stand could be made if the Chinese carried the perimeter walls by assault.

At 7:00 am on 22 February the Chinese delivered their fourth assault. After exploding a mine and making a feint attack to draw the defenders onto the breach, they exploded a second mine under them which killed 12 legionnaires and wounded 20 more. Captain Moulinay, the ranking officer, and 2nd Lieutenant Vincent were both killed in the explosion. The Chinese then charged across the open breach. They were thrown back by a countercharge led by Commandant Dominé in person. Meanwhile, the Chinese exploded a third mine under another section of the perimeter which collapsed almost 60 yards of wall. This explosion was the signal for a Chinese general assault. Hundreds of Chinese soldiers poured out of their trenches and advanced towards the two gaping breaches in the French defences, but the French had now recovered from the shock of the second mine, and drove them back with relative ease.

A fifth Chinese assault was delivered on 24 February, and a sixth on 25 February. Like their predecessors, both assaults were decisively repulsed. But although the garrison had beaten off six attempts to storm its positions, it had lost over a third of its strength (50 dead and 224 wounded) sustaining a heroic defence against overwhelming odds. By the end of February it was clear that Tuyên Quang would fall unless it was relieved immediately.

== The relief ==
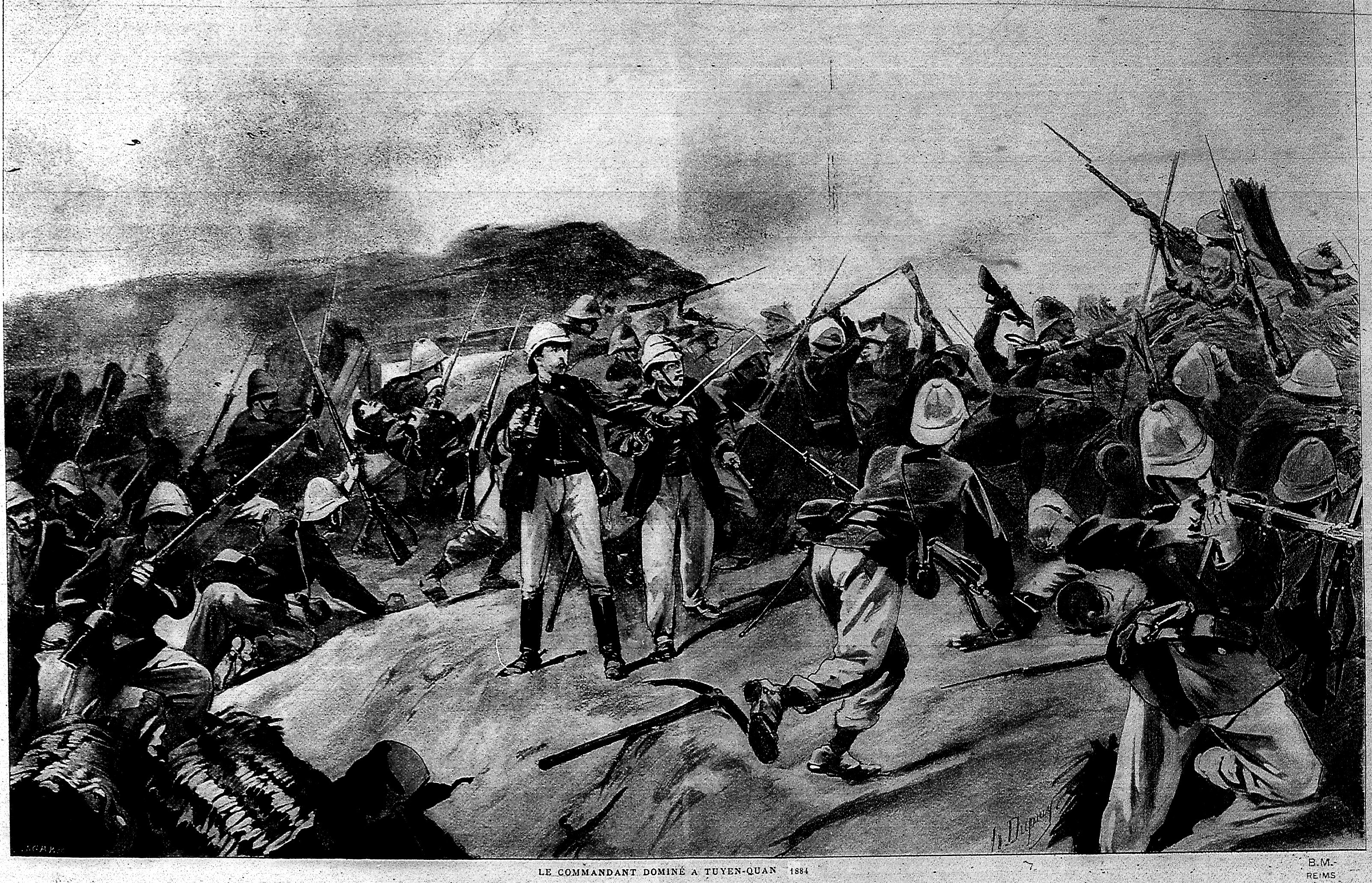
Fights at Tuyên Quang

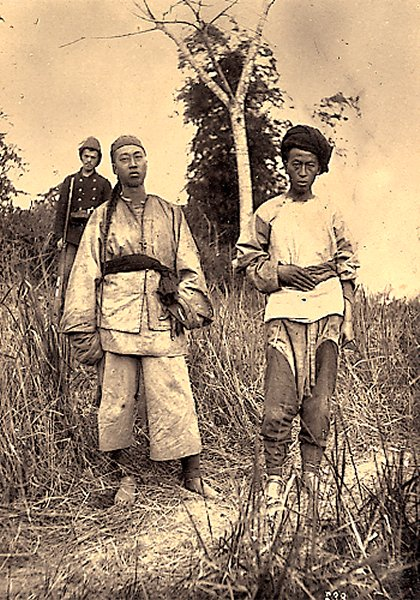
Enemy soldiers captured by the French at Tuyên Quang

During January and February 1885 the besiegers were able to place enormous pressure on the garrison because the bulk of the Tonkin Expeditionary Corps was committed to the Lang Son Campaign (February 1885). However, the capture of Lang Son on 13 February 1885 allowed the French to come to the relief of Tuyên Quang.

General Brière de l’Isle personally led Lieutenant-Colonel Laurent Giovanninelli's 1st Brigade back to Hanoi, and then upriver to the relief of Tuyên Quang. The brigade, reinforced at Phu Doan on 24 February by a small column from Hung Hoa under the command of Lieutenant-Colonel de Maussion, found the route to Tuyên Quang blocked by a strong Chinese defensive position at Hoa Moc.

On 2 March 1885 Giovanninelli attacked the left flank of the Chinese defensive line. The Battle of Hoa Moc was the most fiercely fought action of the Sino-French War. Two French assaults were decisively repulsed, and although the French eventually stormed the Chinese positions, they suffered heavy casualties. Nevertheless, their costly victory cleared the way to Tuyên Quang. The Yunnan Army and the Black Flags raised the siege and drew off to the west, and the relieving force entered the beleaguered post on the afternoon of 3 March.

Three days earlier, on 28 February, the Chinese had made a seventh and final assault on the Tuyên Quang perimeter. Knowing that the relief column was close and that it would be their last chance to capture the post, the Chinese attacked with fanatical courage but once again failed to force the breach. On 2 March the men of the Tuyên Quang garrison listened anxiously to the sounds of rifle and cannon fire from the Yu Oc gorge, where the 1st Brigade was fighting to break through to the beleaguered post. Hopes of relief faded as the sounds of battle continued well into the night. It seemed all too likely that Giovanninelli's men had been halted by the Black Flags.

On the morning of 3 March, to their amazement, the defenders awoke to find that the Chinese had abandoned the siege. Dominé sent out fighting patrols to scout the enemy trenches. The last French fatality of the siege was suffered during a skirmish with a small Chinese rearguard. Legionnaire Striebler saw a Chinese soldier sighting on Captain de Borelli and threw himself between the two men. Striebler was killed instantly by the bullet intended for his captain. The incident, unsurprisingly, haunted de Borelli for the rest of his life. Several years later he made what amends he could by publishing a moving poem to the fellowship of the French Foreign Legion, A mes hommes qui sont morts.

The arrival of the relief column on the afternoon of 3 March was greeted with jubilation by the defenders. Captain Jean-François-Alphonse Lecomte, who had marched with Giovanninelli's brigade, recorded the encounter between Captain de Borelli and General Brière de l'Isle:

We approached the fortress. At the head of a group of officers we saw a captain with a long white beard, who was flourishing his cane and dancing an impromptu jig. The first man he met in the relief column was a bugler. He threw his arms around him. Then he embraced the second bugler. The band tried to keep its dignity, but to no avail. He then abandoned the buglers and fell on the neck of the first drummer. For a moment the drum stood between him and the object of his affections, but eventually he managed to plant two loud kisses on the drummer’s cheeks. Then he made for the general-in-chief. There was a sudden hush, as when an orchestra falls silent at the end of a dance. He recovered himself, solemnly clicked his heels, and saluted General Brière de l’Isle. We recognised Captain de Borelli. "Good afternoon, Captain, how are you? We’re delighted to see you!" "Indeed! Me too! Especially as I only just escaped being killed this morning!"

== Casualties ==
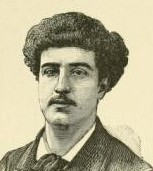
Sergeant Jules Bobillot

The casualties of the Tuyên Quang garrison during the siege were 50 dead and 224 wounded. The dead included the engineering sergeant Jules Bobillot, whose energetic countermeasures had delayed the progress of the Chinese siege works. Bobillot became a national hero in France after his death, and streets in many French towns and villages still bear his name. Casualties in Giovanninelli's 1st Brigade at the Battle of Hoa Moc were 76 dead and 408 wounded.

== Significance ==
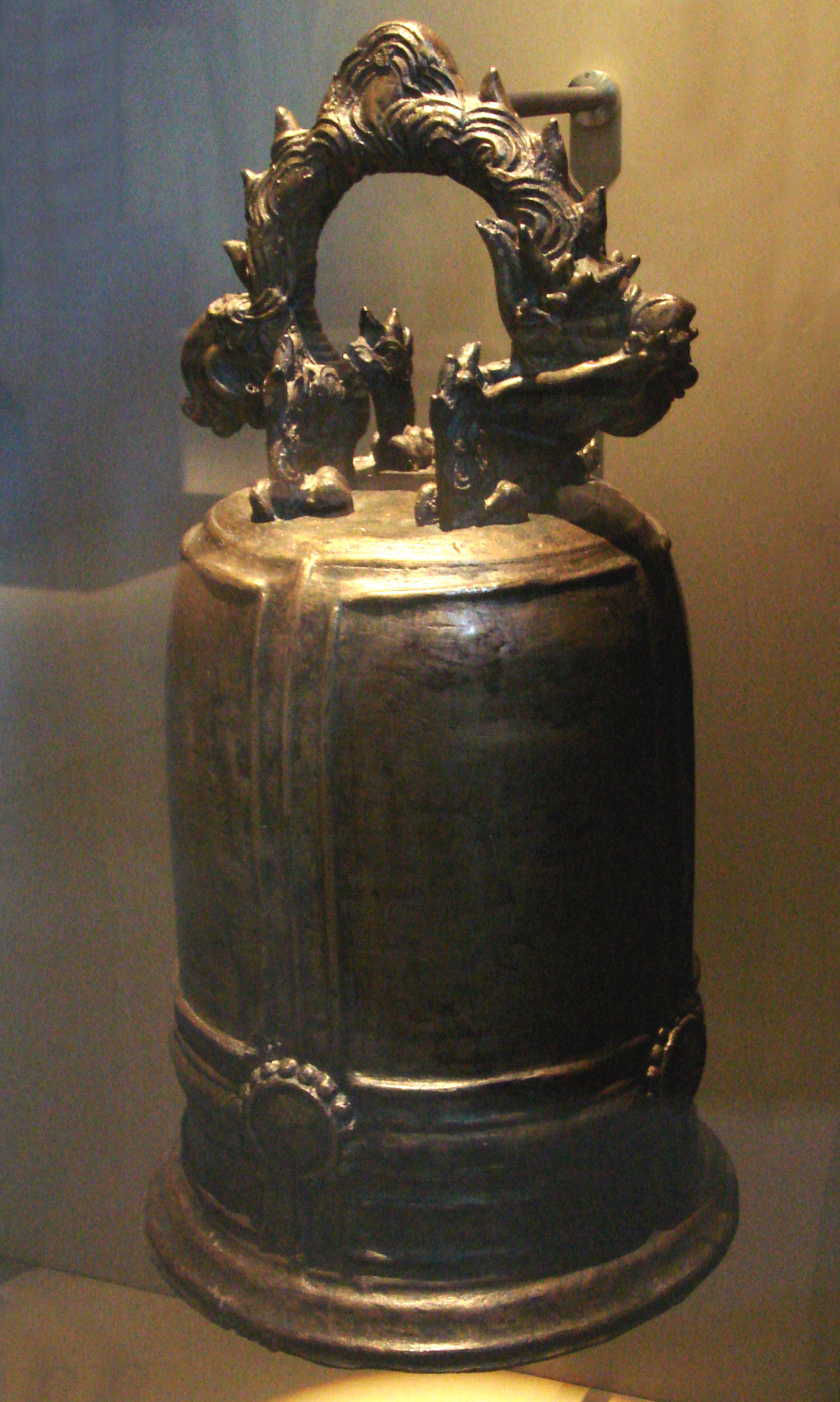
Pagoda bell from the siege of Tuyên Quang – Musée de l'Armée, Paris

In France, the defence of Tuyên Quang became the defining image of the Sino-French War. Dominé's day-by-day diary of the siege was published in full in the Journal officiel, and an order of the day issued by Brière de l'Isle to the men of the Tuyên Quang garrison on 4 March 1885 enjoyed instant celebrity:

Sous le commandement d'un chef héroïque, le chef de bataillon Dominé, vous avez tenu tête pendant trente-six jours, au nombre de six cents, à une armée, dans une bicoque dominée de toutes parts. Vous avez repoussé victorieusement sept assauts. Un tiers de votre effectif et presque tous vos officiers ont été brûlés par les mines ou frappés par les balles et les obus chinois, mais les cadavres de l'ennemi jonchent encore les trois brêches qu'il a vainement faites au corps de place. Aujourd'hui, vous faites l'admiration des braves troupes qui vous ont dégagés au prix de tant de fatigues et de sang versé. Demain, vous serez acclamés par la France entière. Vous tous aussi, vous pourrez dire avec orgueil : "J'étais de la garnison de Tuyen-Quan; j'étais sur la canonnière la Mitrailleuse."

(Under the orders of your gallant commander chef de bataillon Dominé, you 600 men held off an entire army for 36 days, in a small outpost overlooked from all sides. You victoriously repelled seven assaults. One man in every three of you and nearly all your officers were scorched by mines or struck by Chinese bullets and shells; but the bodies of the enemy still choke the three breaches vainly made in the fortress's defences. Today, you enjoy the admiration of the brave soldiers who have relieved you at the cost of so much hardship and bloodshed. Tomorrow, all France will applaud you. Furthermore, you will all be able to say with pride: "I served in the Tuyen Quang garrison; I was on the gunboat Mitrailleuse.")

The defence of Tuyên Quang holds a place second only to the Battle of Camerone in the roll of battle honours of the Foreign Legion, and is commemorated in the first verse of Le Boudin, the Legion's celebrated marching song: Au Tonkin, la Légion immortelle à Tuyen-Quan illustra notre drapeau (In Tonkin, the immortal Legion covered our flag with glory at Tuyên Quang).

The siege also reflected credit on Tang Jingsong's generalship and the professional skills of the Yunnan Army. The Yunnan Army contained a large number of officers and men who had learned the art of siege warfare under Marshal Ma Rulong (Ma Ju-lung, 馬如龍), who crushed a Moslem insurrection in Yunnan in the early 1870s. Captain Jean-François-Alphonse Lecomte, one of the more discerning officers of the Tonkin Expeditionary Corps, paid tribute to the skill the Yunnan Army had shown in its siegecraft at Tuyên Quang:

The mandarins had directed the attack on Tuyên Quang in a very intelligent manner. Owing to the Moslem insurrection in Yunnan, an insurrection that had nearly engulfed the entire province and was only put down by Marshal Ma after several sieges, they were now experts in the art of siegecraft. Their troops were excellent, and although they were unable to capture the fortress, defended as it was by a handful of heroes and relieved in the very nick of time by Giovanninelli’s brigade, this siege was nonetheless a glorious feat of arms for the Celestials and showed that when necessary they could rise to the occasion.
