= Tonkin campaign =

1883–86 French conquest of central and northern Vietnam

Tonkin campaign Campagne du Tonkin (French) Chiến dịch Bắc Kỳ (Vietnamese)
- Part of French conquest of Vietnam
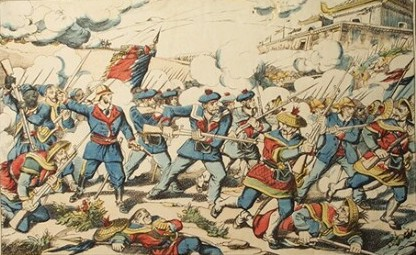
- The Capture of Bắc Ninh, 12 March 1884
Date	1883–1886
Location	Northern Vietnam
Result	French victory
Territorial changes	French protectorate over Tonkin and Annam

Belligerents
(French Third Republic) France	Vietnam; Black Flag Army (until 1885); China (until 1885)

Strength
42,000 soldiers by September 1885	10,000 Vietnamese soldiers 3,000 Black Flag soldiers 50,000 Chinese soldiers

Casualties and losses
4,222 killed or wounded	At least 10,000 killed

The Tonkin campaign was an armed conflict fought between June 1883 and April 1886 by the French against, variously, the Vietnamese, Liu Yongfu's Black Flag Army and the Chinese Guangxi and Yunnan armies to occupy Tonkin (northern Vietnam) and entrench a French protectorate there. The campaign, complicated in August 1884 by the outbreak of the Sino-French War and in July 1885 by the Cần Vương nationalist uprising in Annam (central Vietnam), which required the diversion of large numbers of French troops, was conducted by the Tonkin Expeditionary Corps, supported by the gunboats of the Tonkin Flotilla. The campaign officially ended in April 1886, when the expeditionary corps was reduced in size to a division of occupation, but Tonkin was not effectively pacified until 1896.

== Hanoi and Nam Định (June–July 1883) ==
Nine years after Francis Garnier's unsanctioned attempt to conquer Tonkin was cut short by the French government in 1873, French and Vietnamese troops clashed in Tonkin on 25 April 1882, when Commandant Henri Rivière seized the citadel of Hanoi with a small force of marine infantry.

After a lull of several months, the arrival of reinforcements from France in February 1883 allowed Rivière to mount a campaign to capture the citadel of Nam Định (27 March 1883). The Capture of Nam Định was strategically necessary for the French, to secure their communications with the sea.

During Rivière's absence at Nam Định with the bulk of his forces, chef de bataillon Berthe de Villers defeated a Vietnamese attack on the French positions at Hanoi by Prince Hoàng Kế Viêm at the Battle of Gia Cuc (27 and 28 March 1883).

Although these early actions deserve to be considered part of the Tonkin campaign, the campaign is conventionally considered to have begun in June 1883, in the wake of the decision by the French government to despatch reinforcements to Tonkin to avenge Rivière's defeat and death at the hands of Liu Yongfu's Black Flag Army at the Battle of Paper Bridge on 19 May 1883. These reinforcements were organised into a Tonkin Expeditionary Corps, which was placed under the command of général de brigade Alexandre-Eugène Bouët (1833–87), the highest-ranking marine infantry officer available in the French colony of Cochinchina.

The French position in Tonkin on Bouët's arrival in early June 1883 was extremely precarious. The French had only small garrisons in Hanoi, Haiphong and Nam Định, isolated posts at Hon Gai and at Qui Nhơn in Annam, and little immediate prospect of taking the offensive against Liu Yongfu's Black Flags and Prince Hoàng Kế Viêm's Vietnamese. Bouët's first step was to withdraw the isolated French garrisons of Qui Nhơn and Hon Gai. He had also been authorised to abandon Nam Định at need, but he decided to try to defend all three major French posts. During June, the French dug in behind their defences and beat off half-hearted Vietnamese demonstrations against Hanoi and Nam Định.

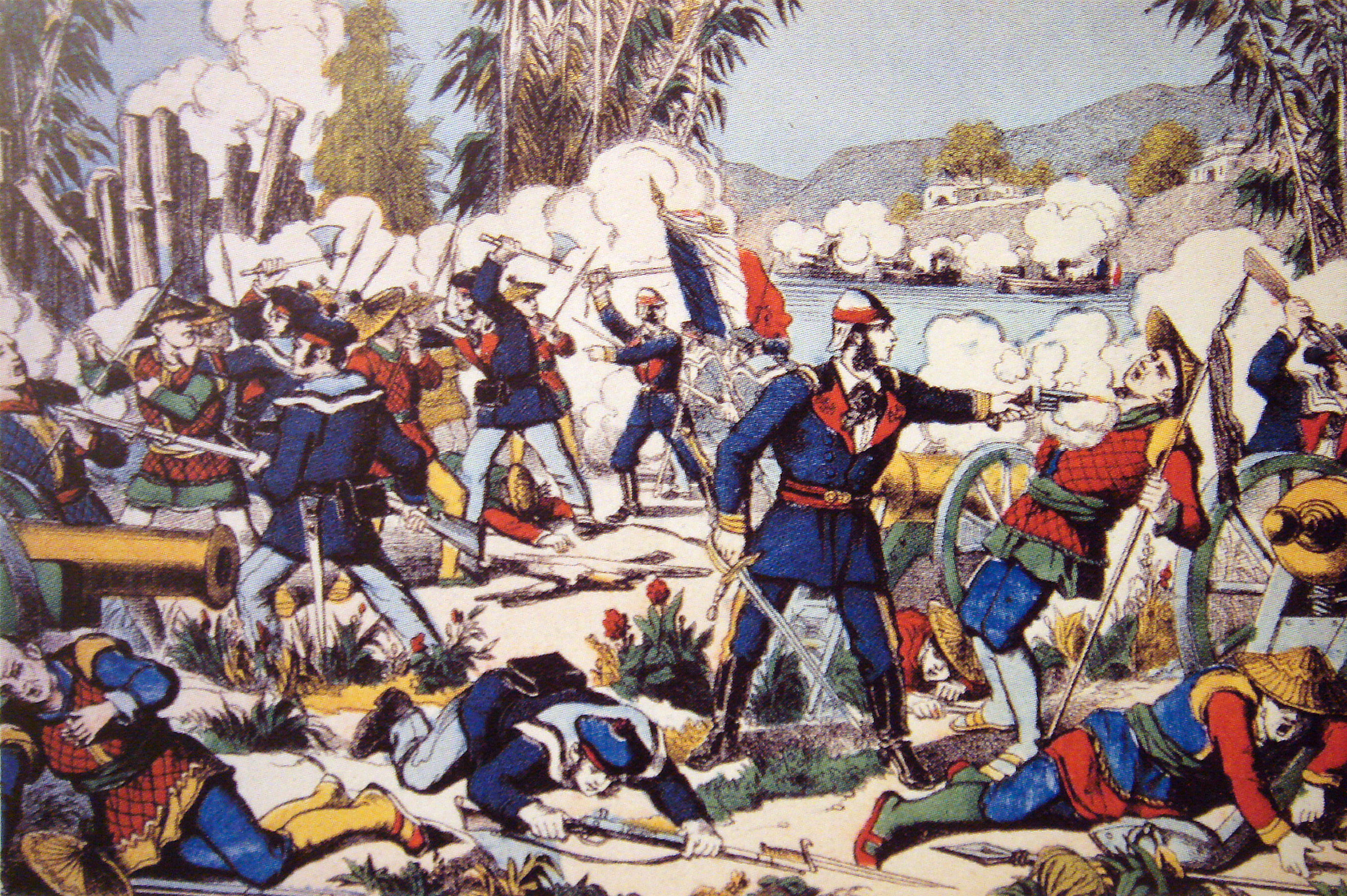
Combat of Nam Định, 19 July 1883.

The early arrival of reinforcements from France and New Caledonia and the recruitment of Cochinchinese and Tonkinese auxiliary formations allowed Bouët to hit back at his tormentors. On 19 July chef de bataillon Pierre de Badens, the French commandant supérieur at Nam Định, attacked and defeated Prince Hoàng Kế Viêm's besieging Vietnamese army, effectively relieving Vietnamese pressure on Nam Định.

== Establishment of the French protectorate (August 1883) ==
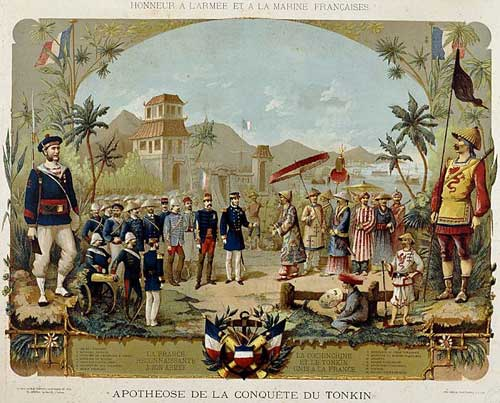
Courbet and Harmand at Huế, August 1883

The arrival of Admiral Amédée Courbet in Ha Long Bay in July 1883 with substantial naval reinforcements further strengthened the French position in Tonkin. Although the French were now in a position to consider taking the offensive against Liu Yongfu, they realised that military action against the Black Flag Army had to be accompanied by a political settlement with the Vietnamese court at Huế, if necessary by coercion, that recognised a French protectorate in Tonkin.

On 30 July 1883 Admiral Courbet, General Bouët and François-Jules Harmand, the recently appointed French civil commissioner-general for Tonkin, held a council of war at Haiphong. The three men agreed that Bouët should launch an offensive against the Black Flag Army in its positions around Phu Hoai on the Day River as soon as possible. They also noted that the Court of Huế was covertly aiding and abetting Liu Yongfu's Black Flag Army, and that Prince Hoàng was still in arms against the French at Nam Định. They therefore decided, largely on Harmand's urging, to recommend to the French government a strike against the Vietnamese defences of Huế, followed by an ultimatum requiring the Vietnamese to accept a French protectorate over Tonkin or face immediate attack.

The proposal was approved by the navy ministry on 11 August, and on 18 August several warships of Courbet's Tonkin Coasts naval division bombarded the Thuận An forts at the entrance to the Huế River. On 20 August, in the Battle of Thuận An, two companies of French marine infantry and the landing companies of three French warships went ashore and stormed the forts under heavy fire. During the afternoon the gunboats Lynx and Vipère forced a barrage at the entrance to the River of Perfumes, enabling the French to attack Huế directly if they chose.

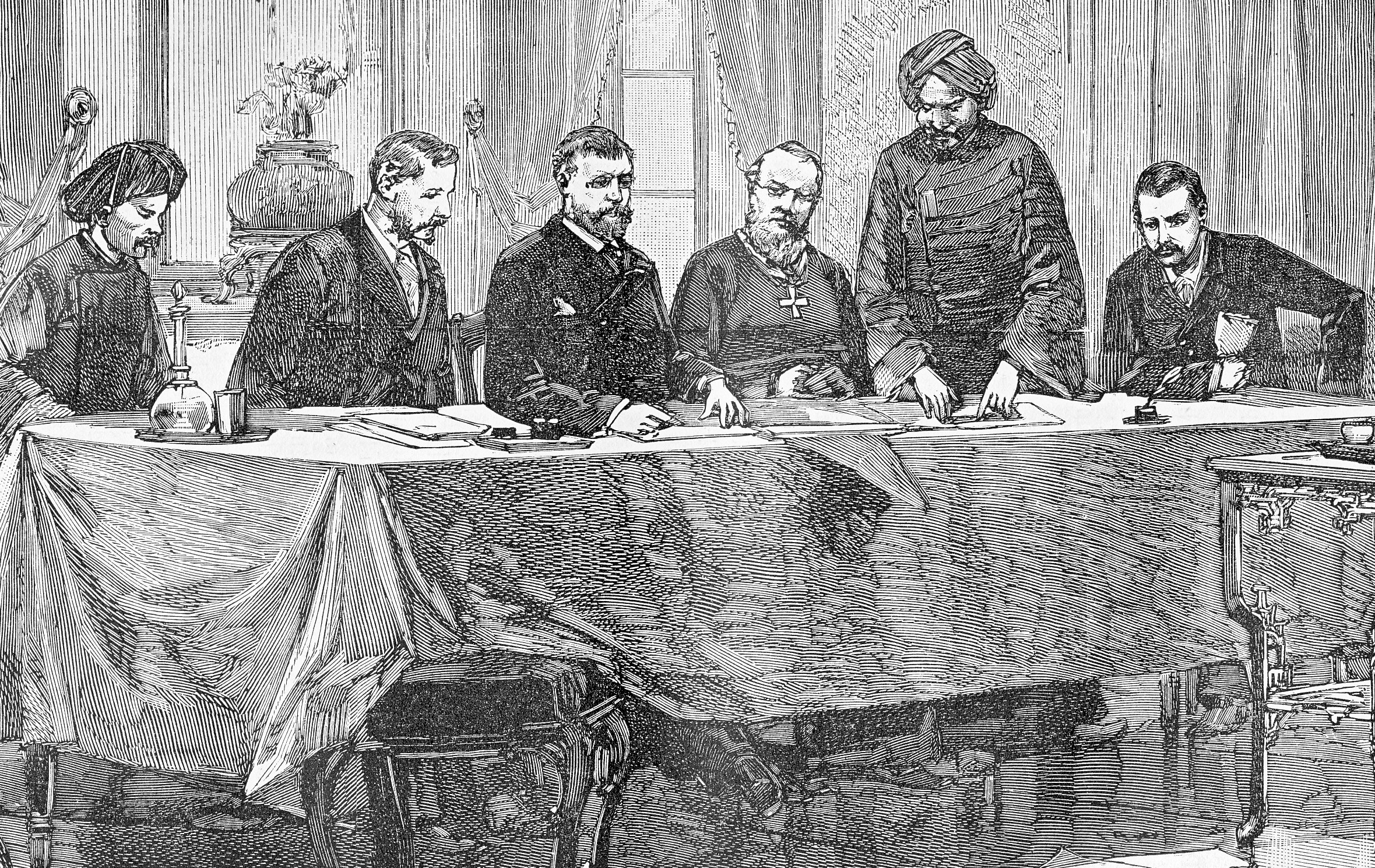
Signature of the Treaty of Huế, 25 August 1883

The Vietnamese asked for an armistice, and on 25 August Harmand dictated the Treaty of Huế to the cowed Vietnamese court. The Vietnamese recognised the legitimacy of the French occupation of Cochinchina, accepted a French protectorate both for Annam and Tonkin and promised to withdraw their troops from Tonkin. Vietnam, its royal house and its court survived, but under French direction. France was granted the privilege of stationing a resident-general at Huế, who would work to the civil commissioner-general in Tonkin and could require a personal audience with the Vietnamese emperor. To ensure there were no second thoughts, a permanent French garrison would occupy the Thuận An forts. Large swathes of territory were also transferred from Annam to Tonkin and the French colony of Cochinchina. The French cancelled the country's debts, but required in return the cession of the southern province of Bình Thuận, which was annexed to Cochinchina. At the same time the northern provinces of Nghệ An, Thanh Hóa and Hà Tĩnh were transferred to Tonkin, where they would come under direct French oversight. In return the French undertook to drive out the Black Flags from Tonkin and to guarantee freedom of commerce on the Red River.

== Phủ Hoài, Palan and Hải Dương (August – November 1883) ==
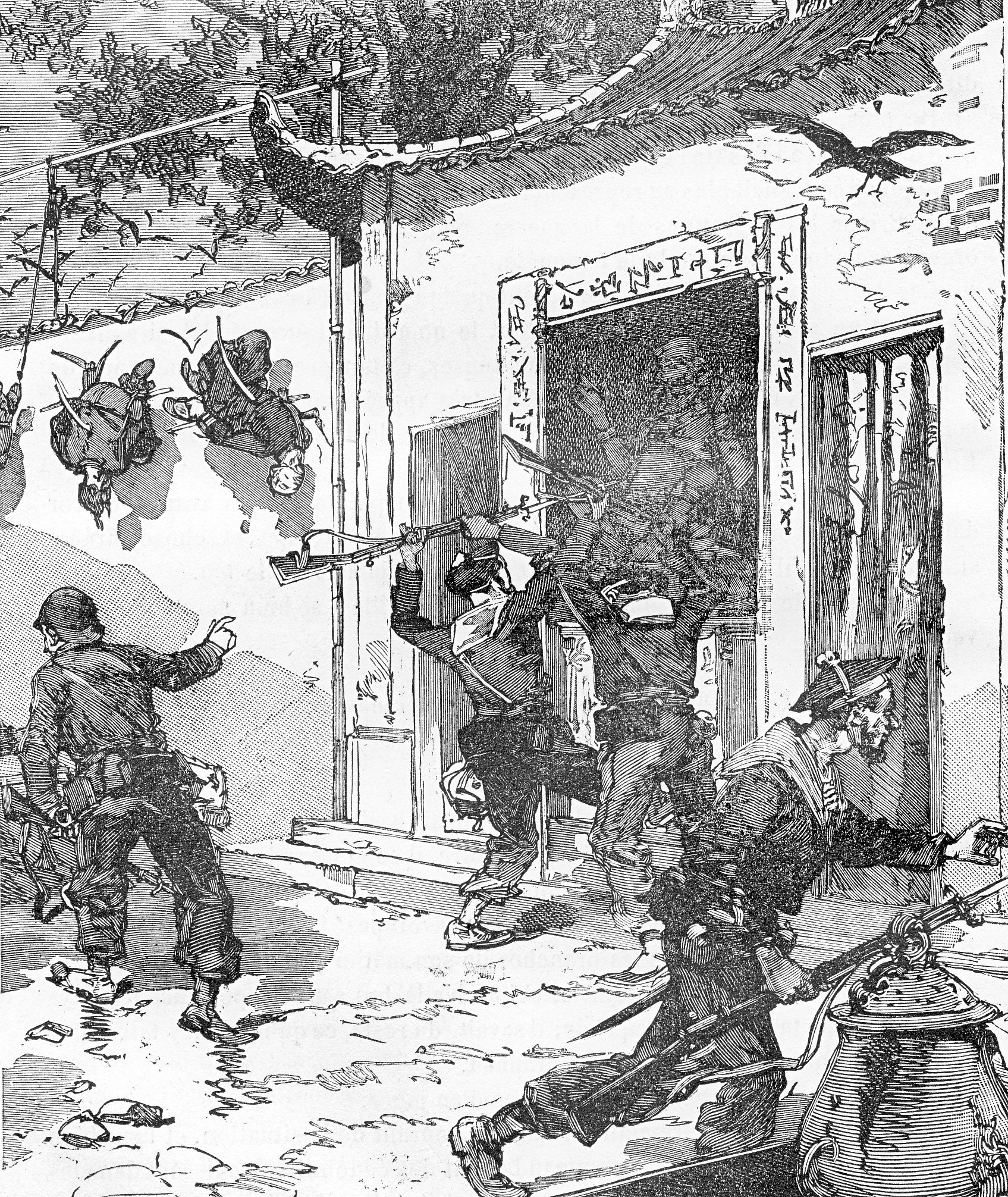
The capture of Haiduong, 13 August 1883

Meanwhile, as agreed at the Haiphong conference, General Bouët duly took the offensive against Liu Yongfu's Black Flag Army. Bouët twice attacked the Black Flags in their defences along the Day River, in the Battle of Phủ Hoài (15 August 1883) and the Battle of Palan (1 September 1883). These offensives met with only limited success, and in the eyes of the world were tantamount to French defeats.

More encouragingly for the French, a column of marine infantry and Cochinchinese riflemen under the command of Lieutenant-Colonel Brionval stormed the Vietnamese defences of Hải Dương on 13 August. The capture of Haiduong was notable for atrocities committed by both the French and the Vietnamese. The French discovered, hung up by hooks from the city walls, the mutilated bodies of several missing French and Vietnamese soldiers of the expeditionary corps. The dead soldiers had clearly been tortured to death, and the French took their revenge by bayoneting the Vietnamese wounded. The capture of Hải Dương secured the French line of communication by river between Hanoi and Haiphong. The French occupied the citadel of Hải Dương and also established a post a few kilometres to the north of the town, at Elephant Mountain.

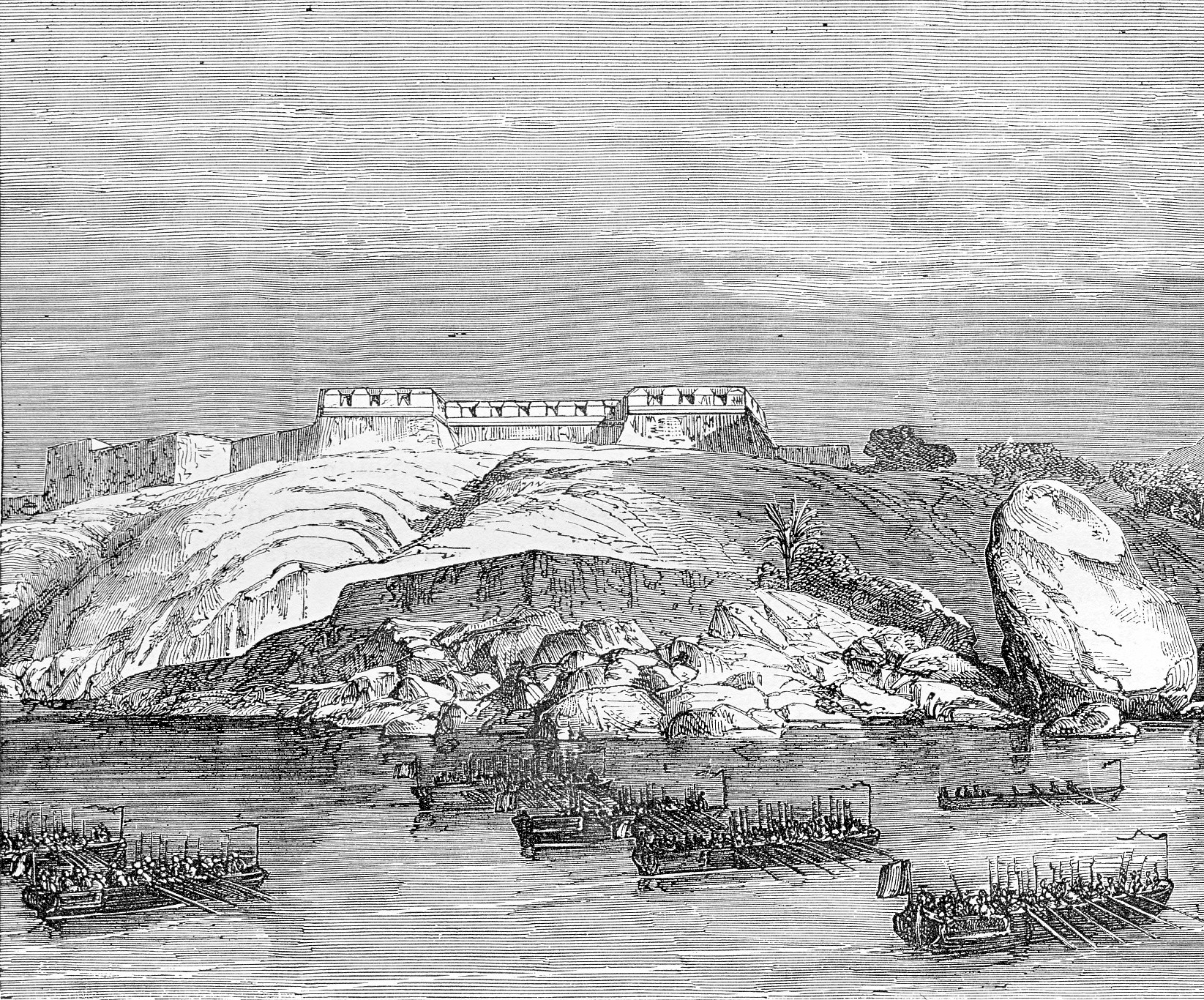
The occupation of Quảng Yên, November 1883

In November 1883 the French further strengthened their grip on the Delta by occupying the towns of Ninh Bình, Hưng Yên and Quảng Yên. The allegiance of Ninh Bình was of particular importance to the French, as artillery mounted in its lofty citadel controlled river traffic to the Gulf of Tonkin. Although the Vietnamese governor of Ninh Bình had made no attempt to hinder the passage of the expedition launched by Henri Rivière in March 1883 to capture Nam Định, he was known to be hostile towards the French. Accordingly, Lieutenant-Colonel Pierre de Badens (1847–97) was sent to occupy Ninh Bình with a company of marine infantry, supported by the gunboats Léopard and Pluvier. Cowed by the silent menace of the gunboats, the Vietnamese handed over the citadel of Ninh Bình without resistance, and the French installed a garrison there.

The Treaty of Huế remained a dead letter in Tonkin. Vietnamese mandarins sent to Tonkin to support French administration there were sullen and uncooperative, and Prince Hoang declined to withdraw Vietnamese forces from Tonkin. Meanwhile, the Black Flags, with Prince Hoang's active encouragement, stepped up their attacks on French posts during the autumn of 1883. The small French garrisons in Palan and Batang were harassed, and on 17 November the French post at Hải Dương was attacked and nearly overwhelmed by a force of 2,000 Vietnamese insurgents. Only the timely arrival of the gunboat Lynx enabled the defenders to hold their positions.

== Sơn Tây (December 1883) ==
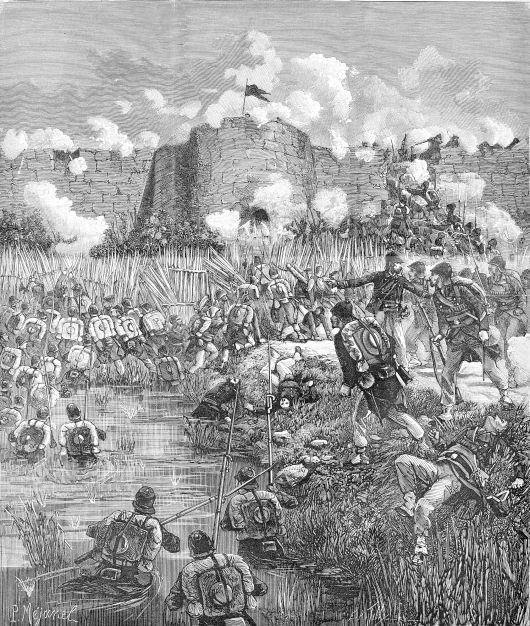
The capture of Sơn Tây, 16 December 1883

In December 1883 the French took their revenge. Admiral Amédée Courbet, who had replaced Bouët in command of the Tonkin Expeditionary Corps two months earlier, assembled a column of 9,000 men and marched on Sơn Tây for a showdown with Liu Yongfu's Black Flag Army. The decision was of considerable political significance, as an attack on Sơn Tây would bring the French into direct conflict with Chinese troops for the first time in the campaign. China, the traditional overlord of Vietnam, had for months been covertly supporting the Black Flags, and had stationed Chinese troops in Sơn Tây, Lạng Sơn, Bắc Ninh and other Tonkinese towns to limit French freedom of movement. The French government appreciated that an attack on Sơn Tây would probably result in an undeclared war with China, but calculated that a quick victory in Tonkin would force the Chinese to accept a fait accompli. On 10 December 1883, after the failure of diplomatic efforts to persuade the Chinese to withdraw their troops, the French government authorised Courbet to attack Sơn Tây.

The Sơn Tây campaign was the fiercest campaign the French had yet fought in Tonkin. Although the Chinese and Vietnamese contingents at Sơn Tây played little part in the defence, Liu Yongfu's Black Flags fought ferociously to hold the city. On 14 December the French assaulted the outer defences of Sơn Tây at Phu Sa, but were thrown back with heavy casualties. Hoping to exploit Courbet's defeat, Liu Yongfu attacked the French lines the same night, but the Black Flag attack also failed disastrously. After resting his troops on 15 December, Courbet again assaulted the defences of Sơn Tây on the afternoon of 16 December. This time the attack was thoroughly prepared by artillery, and delivered only after the defenders had been worn down. At 5 p.m. a Foreign Legion battalion and a battalion of marines captured the western gate of Sơn Tây and fought their way into the town. Liu Yongfu's garrison withdrew to the citadel, and evacuated Sơn Tây under cover of darkness several hours later. Courbet had achieved his objective, but at considerable cost. French casualties at Sontay were 83 dead and 320 wounded. The fighting at Sơn Tây also took a terrible toll of the Black Flags, and in the opinion of some observers broke them once and for all as a serious fighting force.

== Bắc Ninh and Hưng Hóa (January – July 1884) ==
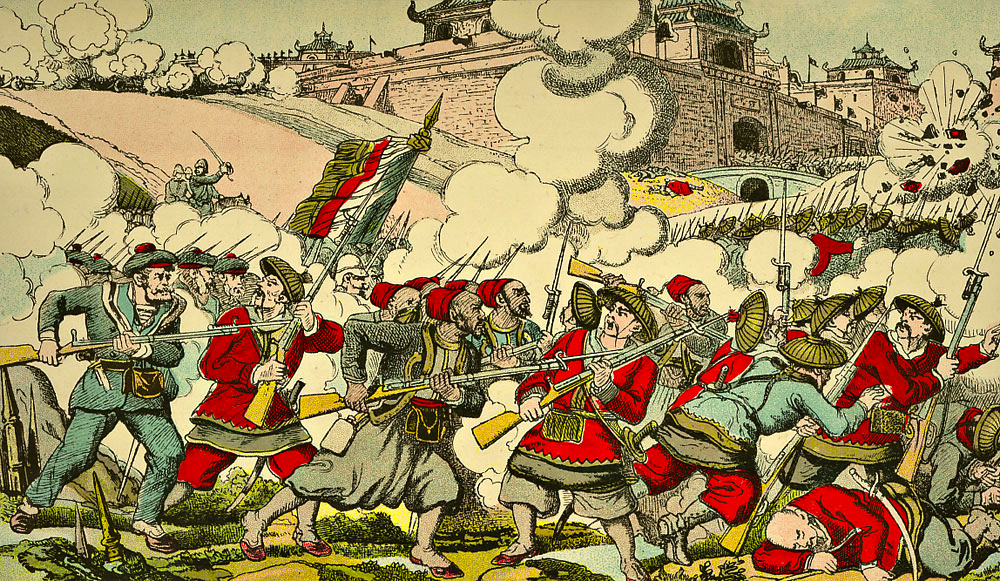
Turcos and Fusiliers de Marine at Bắc Ninh

On 16 December 1883, the very day on which he captured Sơn Tây, Admiral Courbet was replaced in command of the Tonkin Expeditionary Corps by général de division Charles-Théodore Millot, as a result of the despatch of strong reinforcements to Tonkin in November 1883 and the consequent expansion of the expeditionary corps into a two-brigade army division. Although the capture of Sơn Tây paved the way for the eventual French conquest of Tonkin, the French now had to deal with opposition from China as well as the Black Flag Army. Having exhausted diplomatic efforts to persuade the Chinese to withdraw their armies from Tonkin, the French government sanctioned an attack by Millot on the fortress of Bắc Ninh, occupied since the autumn of 1882 by China's Guangxi Army. In March 1884, in the Bắc Ninh campaign, Millot routed the Guangxi Army and captured Bắc Ninh. Millot put just over 11,000 French, Algerian and Vietnamese soldiers into the field at Bắc Ninh, the largest concentration of French troops ever assembled in the Tonkin campaign.

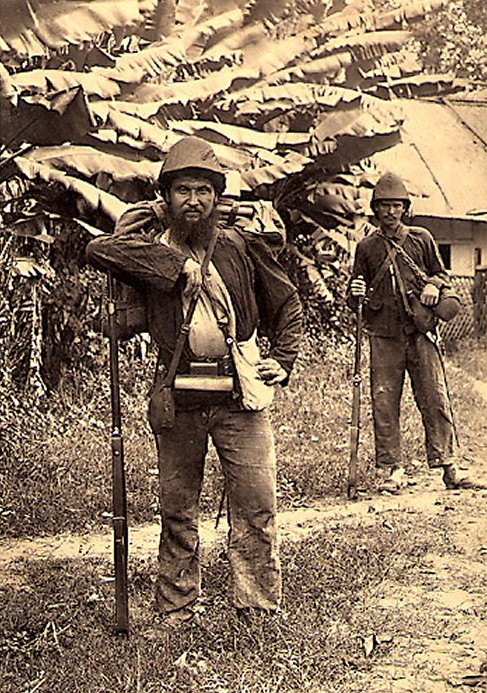
French marine infantrymen in Tonkin, 1884

Millot followed up his victory by mopping up scattered Chinese garrisons left behind by the Guangxi Army after the rout at Bắc Ninh and by mounting a major campaign against Liu Yongfu's Black Flag Army, which had retreated to Hưng Hóa. On 11 April 1884 Millot captured Hưng Hóa and Dong Yan, flanking the Black Flag Army and its Vietnamese allies out of a formidable defensive position without losing a man.

The Black Flag Army retreated westwards up the Red River to Thanh Quan, while Prince Hoang Ke Viem's Vietnamese forces fell back southwards from Dong Yan towards the Annam-Tonkin border, making for the sanctuary of the province of Thanh Hóa, where the French had not yet installed any garrisons. Millot despatched Lieutenant-Colonel Letellier with two Turco battalions and supporting cavalry to harry Liu Yongfu's retreat, and sent General Brière de l'Isle with the rest of the 1st Brigade in pursuit of Prince Hoang. In early May Brière de l'Isle cornered Prince Hoang in Phu Ngo, several kilometres to the northwest of Ninh Bình, but the French government forbade him to attack the Vietnamese defences, having just received news that China was ready to treat with France over the future of Tonkin.

Elsewhere, though, the French kept up the pressure. On 11 May chef de bataillon Reygasse attacked the Chinese garrison of Thái Nguyên and drove it out. In the same week the landing companies of Admiral Courbet's Tonkin Coasts naval division exterminated nests of Vietnamese pirates along the coast of the Gulf of Tonkin around Dam Ha and Ha Coi.

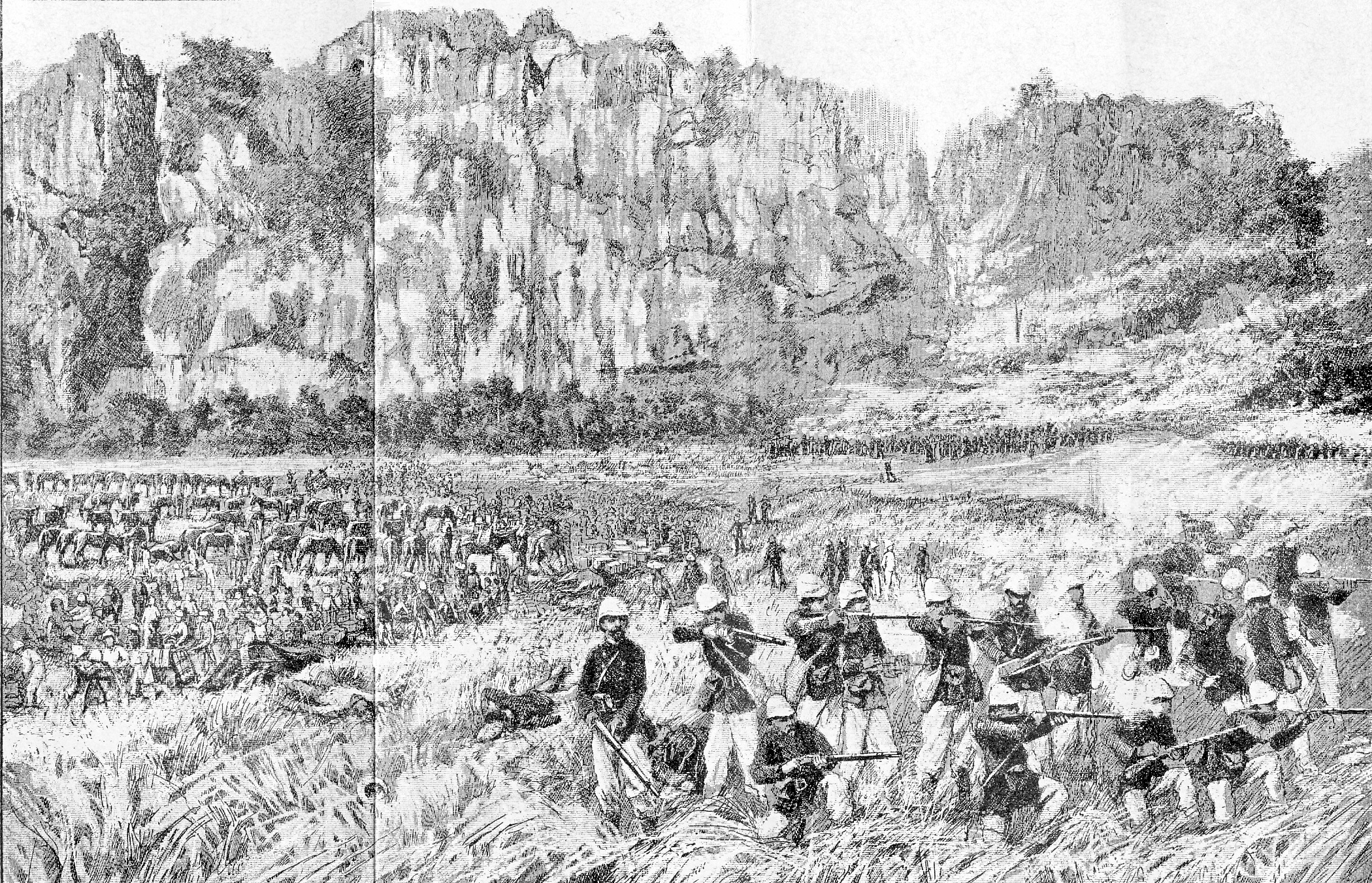
The Bắc Lệ ambush, 23 June 1884

On 11 May 1884, the same day as French and Chinese forces clashed at Thái Nguyên, France and China concluded the Tientsin Accord. This treaty provided for the immediate evacuation of Tonkin by the Chinese armies, and the implicit recognition by China of the French protectorate over Tonkin (the Chinese agreed to recognise all treaties concluded between France and Annam, including the 1883 Treaty of Huế which formalised the French protectorate in Tonkin).

The conclusion of the Tientsin Accord allowed the French to consolidate their hold on the Delta in May and June 1884. By the end of June the French had established forward bases at Hưng Hóa, Tuyên Quang, Phu Lang Thuong and Thái Nguyên. These posts, together with the bases established further to the east at Hải Dương and Quảng Yên the previous autumn, formed a cordon that enclosed most of the Delta. Behind this chain of frontline posts the French were strongly entrenched in Sơn Tây, Hanoi, Nam Định, Ninh Bình, Bắc Ninh and Sept Pagodes. It only remained for them to occupy Lạng Sơn and the other fortresses of northern Tonkin once they were evacuated by the Chinese under the terms of the Tientsin Accord.

In theory, the Tientsin Accord should have resolved the confrontation between France and China in Tonkin, but a clash between French and Chinese troops at Bac Le on 23 June 1884 plunged both countries into a fresh crisis. China's refusal to pay an indemnity for the Bắc Lệ ambush led two months later to the outbreak of the Sino-French War (August 1884–April 1885).

== The Sino-French War (August 1884 – April 1885) ==
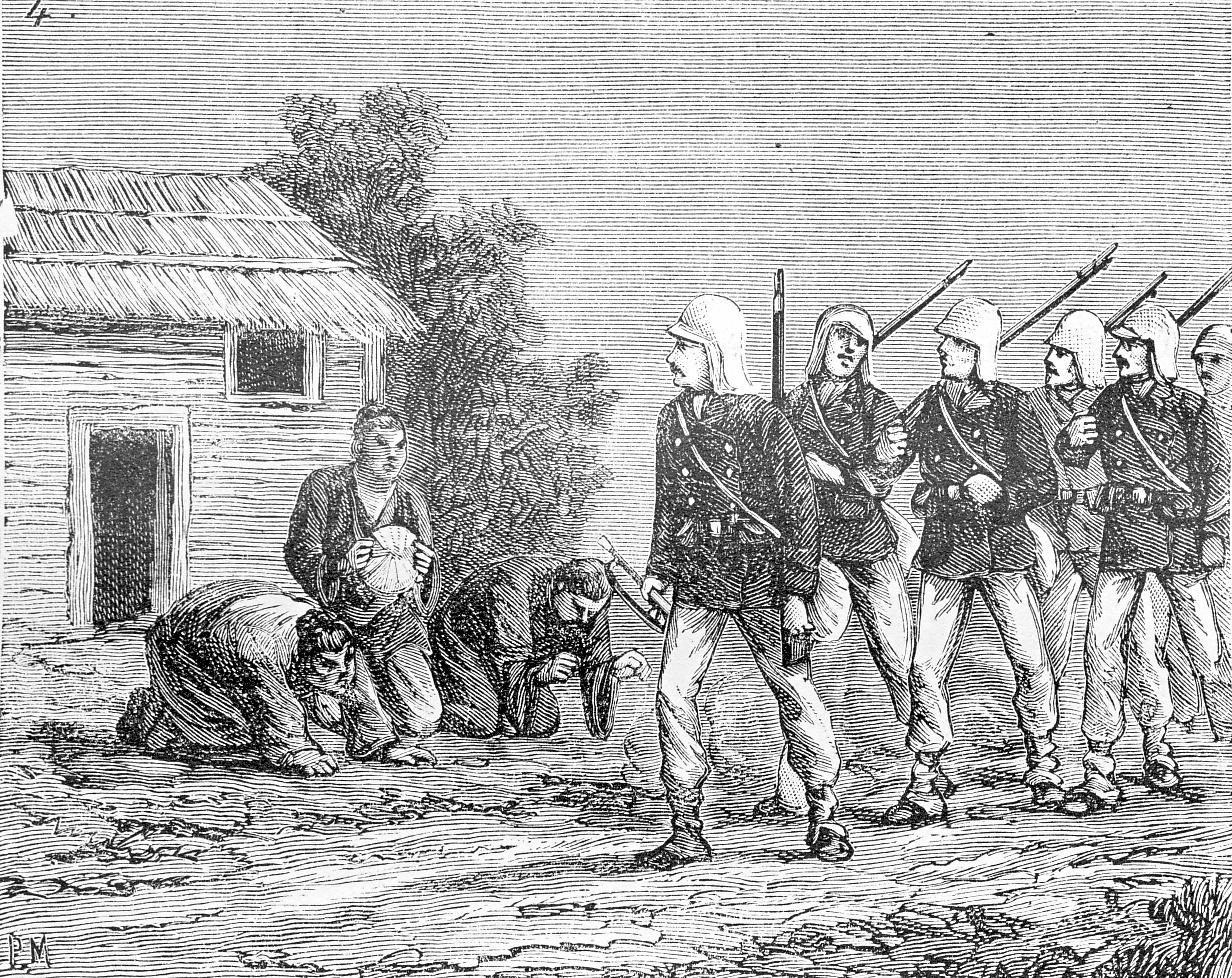
Tonkinese villagers were expected to show their respect by kowtowing to passing French columns

The outbreak of the Sino-French War in August 1884 complicated and considerably retarded the French timetable for the conquest of Tonkin, and initially placed the French on the defensive against an invasion of the Delta by the Chinese armies. In September 1884 General Millot resigned as general-in-chief of the Tonkin Expeditionary Corps and was replaced by his senior brigade commander, Louis Brière de l'Isle. Revealingly, Millot's final order of the day to the soldiers of the expeditionary corps contained a warning against growing French arrogance. By now there were more than 20,000 French soldiers serving in Tonkin, and many of them were beginning to treat the local population with contempt. Tonkinese villagers, for example, were expected to kowtow if a French column passed by. Millot saw that this attitude was stirring up trouble for the future, and issued a prescient warning:

Je n'ai plus qu'un conseil à vous donner : soyez pour mon successeur, le général Brière de l'Isle, ce que vous avez été pour moi, et n'oubliez pas surtout que votre présence dans le pays sera d'autant plus facilement acceptée que vous perdrez moins de vue les tendances et les aspirations des laborieuses populations qui l'habitent.

(I have only one word of advice to give you. Be to my successor, General Brière de l'Isle, what you have been to me. Above all, never forget that your presence in this country will be all the more easily accepted the more you bear in mind the customs and aspirations of the hard-working peoples that inhabit it.)

Brière de l'Isle was a natural leader of men, and under his command the expeditionary corps achieved a high standard of professional excellence. One of his first acts as general-in-chief, in September 1884, was to seal off Tonkin from Annam by ejecting Vietnamese bandit concentrations from the border towns of My Luong, Ke Son and Phu Ngo and establishing French posts there. This stroke secured the French rear and allowed the expeditionary corps to concentrate substantial forces against the expected Chinese invasion.

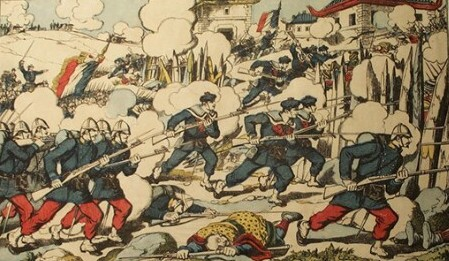
The battle of Kép, 8 October 1884

In October 1884 General François de Négrier defeated a major Chinese invasion of the Tonkin Delta in the Kép campaign. This campaign brought French troops into the hitherto-unexplored Luc Nam valley, and at the close of the campaign the French occupied the villages of Chu and Kép, which were converted into forward bases for an eventual campaign against Lạng Sơn. In the western Delta, where their advanced post of Tuyên Quang lay under growing threat from the advancing Yunnan Army, the French widened their area of occupation in the autumn of 1884 by establishing posts at Phu Doan and Vie Tri on the Clear River.

In February 1885 Brière de l'Isle defeated China's Guangxi Army in the Lạng Sơn campaign. The French occupation of Dong Song on 6 February threatened the line of retreat of the Guangxi Army's right wing, and forced the Chinese to withdraw from their positions in the Song Thuong valley to the west of Lạng Sơn. The occupation of Lạng Sơn on 13 February gave the French control of the Mandarin Road from Lạng Sơn all the way back to Hanoi, and Brière de l'Isle was able to use the road to bring prompt relief to the hard-pressed French garrison of Tuyên Quang. During the second fortnight of February Colonel Laurent Giovanninelli's 1st Brigade marched down the Mandarin Road to Hanoi and was then ferried up the Red and Clear Rivers to Phu Doan aboard a flotilla of gunboats. On 2 March 1885 Giovanninelli defeated Liu Yongfu's Black Flags in the Battle of Hòa Mộc, relieving the Siege of Tuyên Quang.

In March 1885 the French established posts at Cau Son and Thanh Moy, previously occupied by the Guangxi Army, and began to widen the Mandarin Road so that it could be used by wagon trains to supply de Négrier's 2nd Brigade at Lạng Sơn. Further to the east, French troops extended the zone of French control along the Gulf of Tonkin, establishing a post at Tien Yen.

In the west, Giovanninelli's victory at Hòa Mộc on 2 March allowed the French to consider an offensive from their main base at Hưng Hóa against the Yunnan and Black Flag Armies. Brière de l'Isle drew up plans for an advance up the Red River by Giovanninelli's brigade against the Yunnan Army's positions around Thanh Quan, but simultaneous reverses on both the eastern and western fronts on 24 March (the Battle of Bang Bo (Zhennan Pass) and the Battle of Phu Lam Tao) and the subsequent Retreat from Lạng Sơn on 28 March threw out his plans for an early penetration of the upper course of the Red River.

== The 'pacification' of Tonkin (April 1885 – April 1886) ==
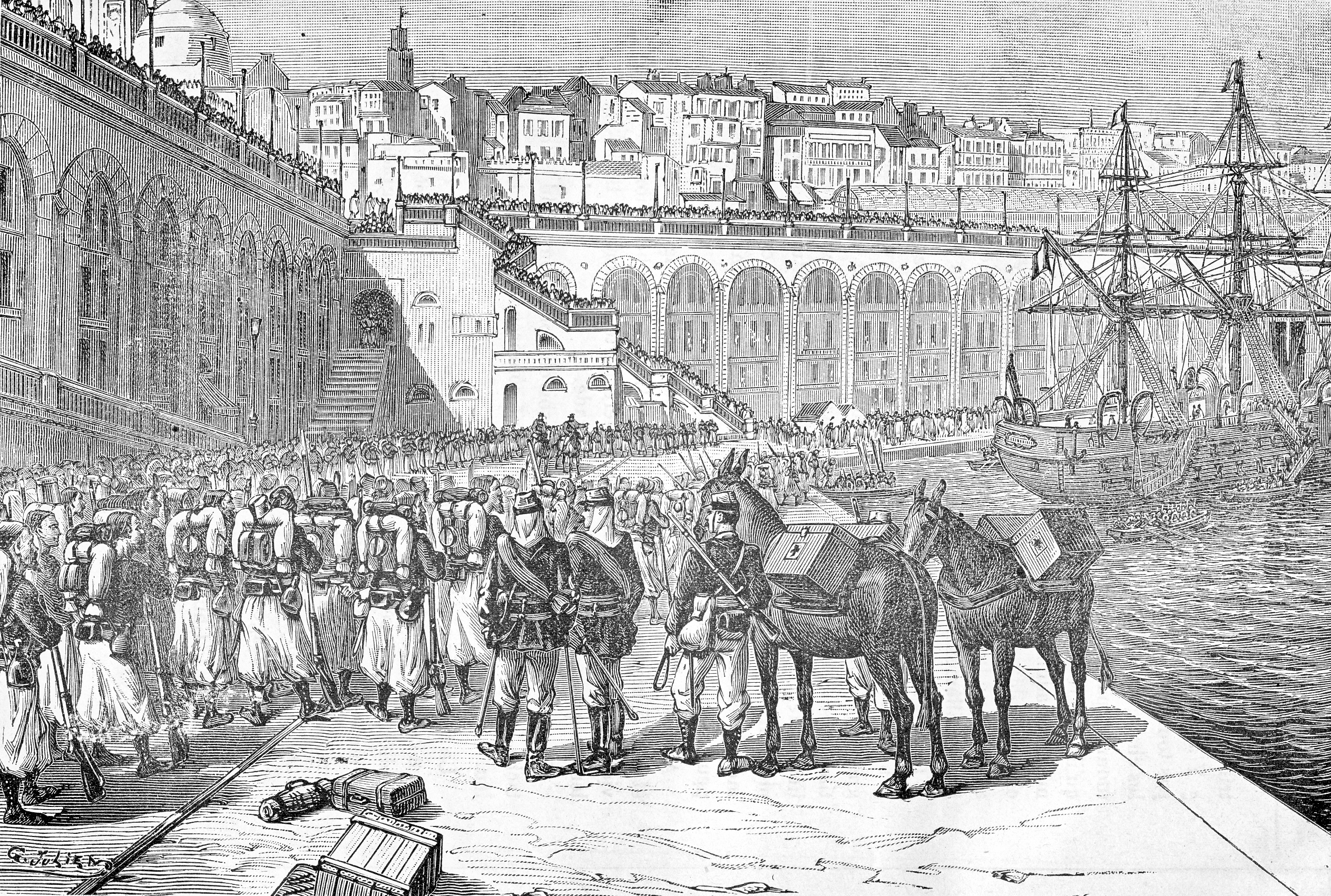
Zouaves embarking at Algiers for Tonkin, January 1885

The Sino-French War ended with the Chinese military pushed out of Tonkin, and the resulting peace treaty between France and China, signed at Tientsin on 9 June 1885, forced China to abandon its historic claim to suzerainty over Vietnam and confirmed the French protectorate over both Annam and Tonkin. In theory, the way was now clear for the French to consolidate their claim to Tonkin. In practice, this was not so easy as it might have seemed. As a British statesman remarked at the time: 'France has won her claim to Tonkin; now all she has to do is conquer it.'

Strong reinforcements were sent to Tonkin in the wake of the Retreat from Lạng Sơn (March 1885), bringing the total number of French soldiers in Tonkin to 35,000 in the summer of 1885. In May and June 1885 thousands of fresh French troops poured into Tonkin, swamping the veterans of the two brigades that had fought the Sino-French War, and the expeditionary corps was reorganised into two two-brigade divisions. Brière de l'Isle was replaced in command of the expeditionary corps on 1 June 1885 by General Philippe-Marie-Henri Roussel de Courcy (1827–1887), but remained in Tonkin for several months as commander of the 1st Division of the expanded expeditionary corps. General François de Négrier, who had recovered from the wound he sustained at the Battle of Ky Lua (28 March 1885), was given command of the 2nd Division.

De Courcy's command was marked by growing resistance to French rule in Tonkin and by outright insurrection in Annam. It was also memorable for a cholera epidemic which swept through the expeditionary corps in the summer and autumn of 1885, exacerbated by de Courcy's neglect of quarantine precautions, in which more French soldiers died than in the entire nine months of the Sino-French War. Elements of the Tonkin expeditionary corps were attacked at Huế on 2 July 1885 in the so-called 'Huế Ambush', which initiated the Vietnamese insurrection. Forbidden by the French government to launch a full-scale invasion of Annam, de Courcy landed troops along the vulnerable coastline of central Vietnam to seize a number of strategic points and to protect Vietnamese Catholic communities in the wake of massacres of Christians by the Vietnamese insurgents at Quảng Ngãi and Bình Định.

Meanwhile, Tonkin was in a state of near-anarchy. The Chinese armies that had fought the Sino-French War dutifully withdrew from Tonkin in May and June 1885, but their ranks were by then full of Vietnamese volunteers or conscripts, and these men, unpaid for months, were simply disbanded on Tonkinese soil and left to fend for themselves. They kept their weapons and supported themselves by brigandage, in many cases sheltering behind the patriotic rhetoric of the Cần Vương insurgency against the French. For most of the summer of 1885, when European troops normally kept to their barracks anyway, French control of Tonkin was limited to a small radius around the perimeter of their military posts.

No attempt was made by de Courcy to move forward to reoccupy Lạng Sơn, evacuated by the Chinese in May, nor to secure the forts built by the Yunnan Army along the Red River to protect its supply line during the Siege of Tuyên Quang. Bands of brigands took over these forts as soon as the Chinese evacuated them. The bandits struck far and wide beyond the limits of French control. Wherever they could, Tonkinese villagers left their homes and took shelter beneath the walls of the French forts.

Only one important French sweep was made during the summer of 1885 in Tonkin, and its effects were transitory. In July 1885 a mixed column of Algerian and Tonkinese riflemen under the command of Colonel Mourlan drove a band of insurgents from the Tam Dao massif and established a French post at Lien Son. The insurgents fled without accepting battle and regrouped in Thái Nguyên province.

The blundering response of de Courcy and his staff officers to the twin challenges in Annam and Tonkin has been memorably characterised in a recent French study of the period:

Comme dans un drame shakespearien, des grotesques s’agitent sur le devant de la scène pendant que la tragédie se poursuit dans le sang, sur toute l'étendue du Tonkin ravagé et de l'Annam qui bascule dans la guerre au cours de l'été.

(As in a Shakespearean drama, clowns gambolled at the front of the stage while the tragedy was played out in blood, not only across ravaged Tonkin but in Annam too, which during the summer slid into war.)

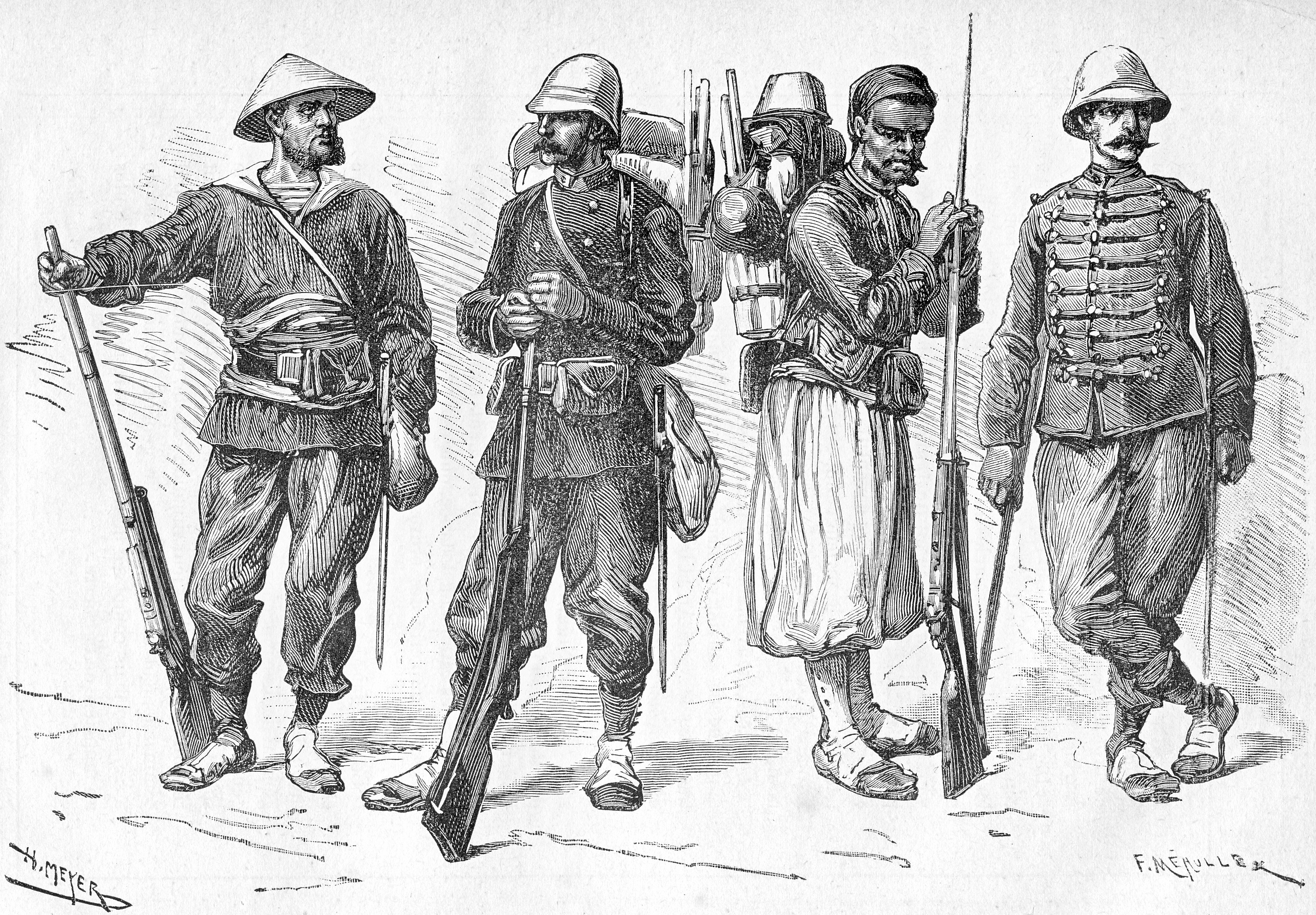
Uniforms of the Tonkin expeditionary corps, 1885 (fusilier-marin, marine infantryman, Turco and marine artilleryman)

De Courcy bestirred himself with the arrival of the autumn campaigning season. The main French effort was made in the west, along the Red River. The Tonkin expeditionary corps undertook a large-scale campaign in October 1885 to capture the Yunnan Army's old base at Thanh May, which had been occupied by Vietnamese insurgents some months earlier. De Courcy concentrated 7,000 troops for the attack on Thanh May, almost as many men as Brière de l'Isle had commanded during the Lạng Sơn campaign in February 1885. An elaborate encircling movement was mishandled, and though the French duly occupied Thanh May, avenging their defeat in the Battle of Phu Lam Tao seven months earlier, most of the brigands escaped the closing pincers and regrouped further up the Red River around Thanh Quan.

In the first week of February 1886 two columns commanded by General Jamais and Lieutenant-Colonel de Maussion, under the overall direction of General Jamont, advanced up both banks of the Red River as far as Thanh Quan. The bands that had been driven from Thanh May did not stay to fight, but melted into the forests before the French advance. On 17 February the French occupied Van Ban Chau. After a pause of several weeks while the French government notified the Chinese that French troops would shortly be closing up to the Chinese frontier, de Maussion was authorised to advance to the Tonkin–Yunnan border. The French occupied Lào Cai on 29 March, and went on to establish a chain of military posts along the Red River between Lào Cai and Thanh Quan. De Maussion was appointed commandant supérieur of the Haute Fleuve Rouge region.

The French also raised their flags along the Tonkin-Guangxi border. The terms of the June 1885 peace treaty between France and China required both parties to demarcate the border between China and Tonkin. As it would have been embarrassing for the French to admit that this could not be done because the Lạng Sơn region had been overrun by brigands since the departure of the Guangxi Army in May 1885, de Courcy was forced to send an expedition to regain control of the border region. In November 1885 chef de bataillon Servière led a column north from Chu to reoccupy Lạng Sơn and Đồng Đăng. He went on install French posts at That Ke and Cao Bằng. This acte de présence established the conditions necessary for an orderly demarcation of the Sino-Vietnamese border in 1887, in which a few minor revisions were made in China's favour.

Although the tricolour now flew above French customs posts along the Chinese border, there remained widespread unrest inside Tonkin itself. Significantly, General François de Négrier was forced to make a major sweep of the Bai Sai region near Hanoi in December 1885, an operation in which hundreds of French troops died of cholera and other diseases.

In April 1886 General Warnet, who had replaced de Courcy as commander of the Tonkin Expeditionary Corps a few months earlier, declared that he considered Tonkin to be pacified, and proposed to the French government that the expeditionary corps should be reduced in size to a division of occupation. Conventionally, April 1886 marks the end of the Tonkin campaign. The belief that Tonkin was pacified, however, was ludicrously premature. The Pacification of Tonkin, sometimes involving fighting on a large scale, would require a further ten years.

== Commemoration ==
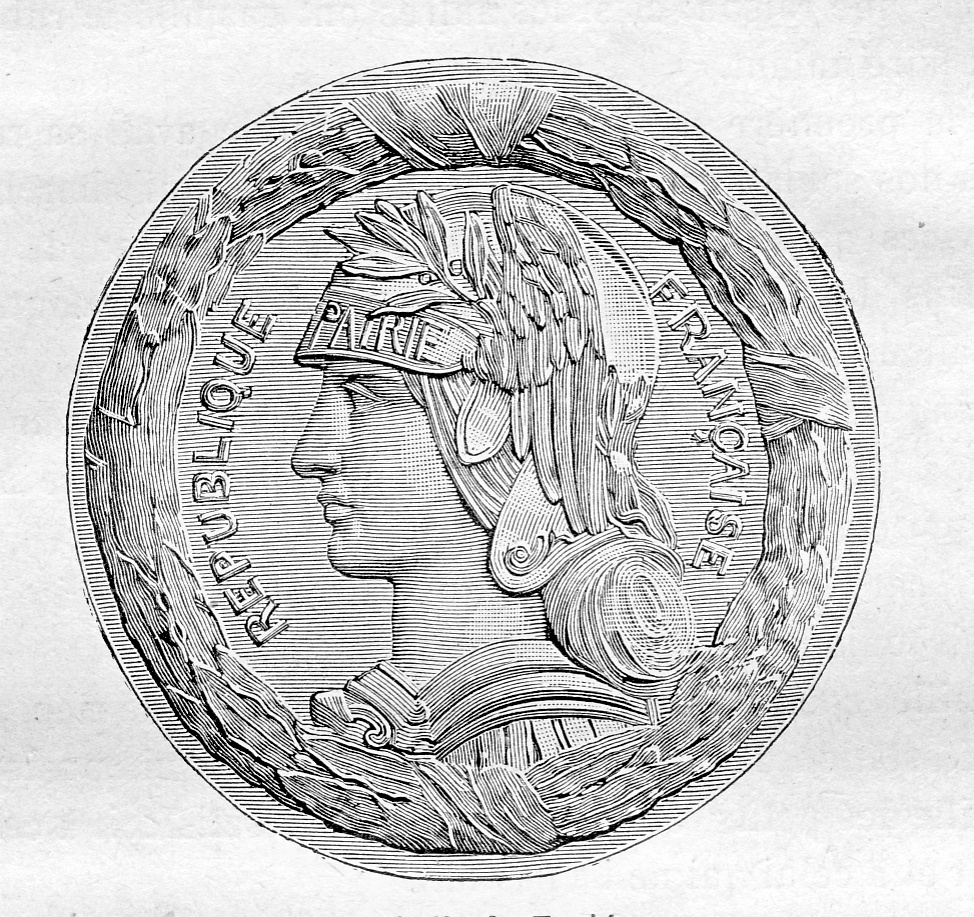
The Tonkin commemorative medal

The Tonkin campaign was commemorated in France with the issue of a Tonkin Expedition commemorative medal. French soldiers who had taken part in the campaign had hoped that the medal would be inscribed with the names of all their Tonkin victories, but there were some puzzling absences, notably the Lạng Sơn campaign, from the feats of arms commemorated. This decision angered many veterans, who felt that it did not adequately recognise their deeds.

The veterans were further offended by the arrangements made for the Bastille Day parade of 14 July 1886, an imposing annual march through the streets of Paris by the men of France's armed and disciplined services. A special effort was made on this occasion to honour the men who had fought the war with China. Contingents from the battalions and batteries that had served in Tonkin and Formosa marched in the parade, wearing battlefield uniforms instead of full dress. Other arrangements, however, were not so welcome. Although Lieutenant-Colonel Marc-Edmond Dominé, the hero of the Siege of Tuyên Quang, rode in the procession, General Louis Brière de l'Isle and General François de Négrier did not. Both men were heroes to the soldiers of the expeditionary corps, and the veterans greatly resented their absence from the parade. Instead, the man who rode at the head of the march past was the controversial and ambitious new army minister General Georges Boulanger, who only three years later would be suspected of plotting a coup against the Third Republic. Boulanger had not served in Tonkin, but he was determined to take any credit going for its conquest.

== Key French players in the Tonkin campaign ==
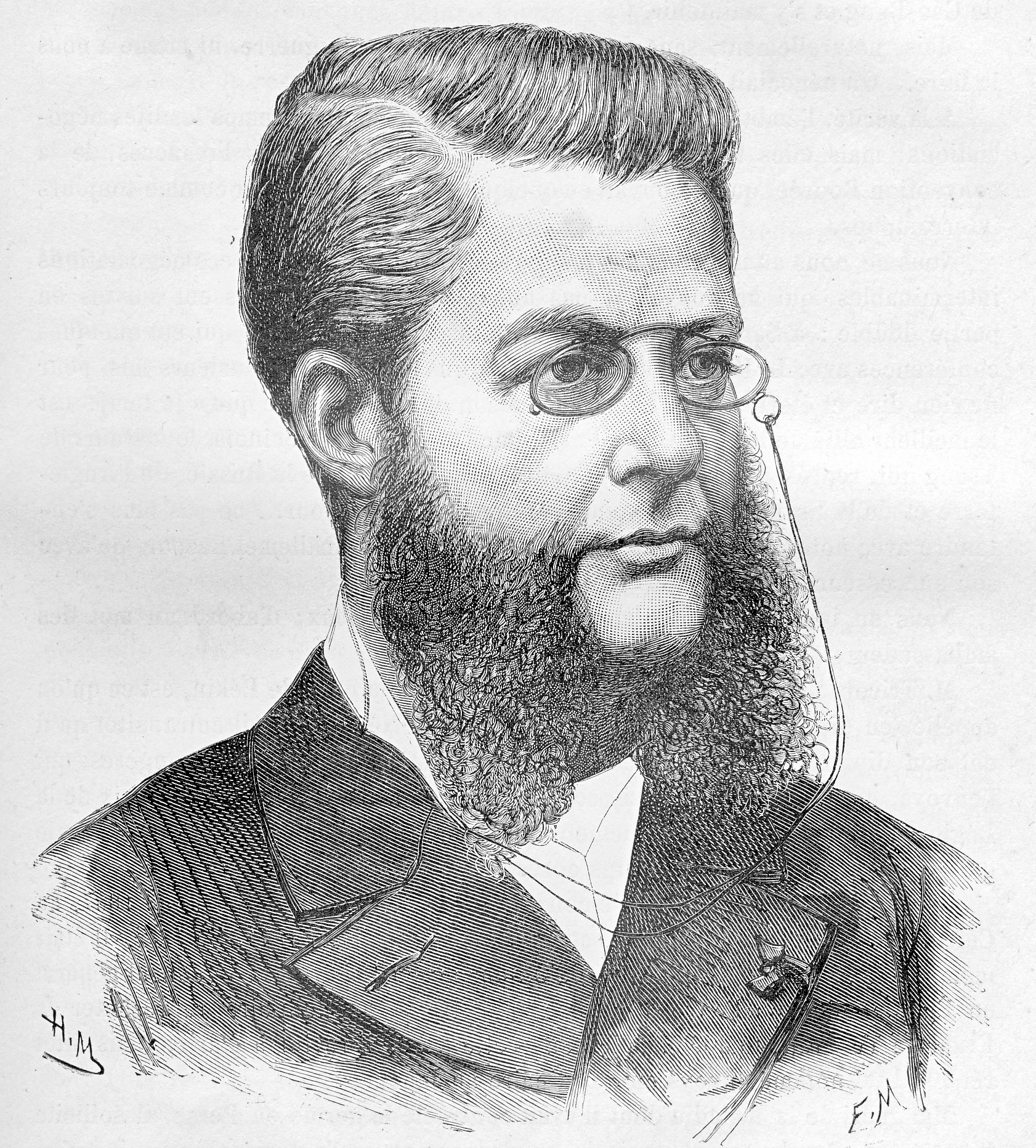
François-Jules Harmand (1845–1921)

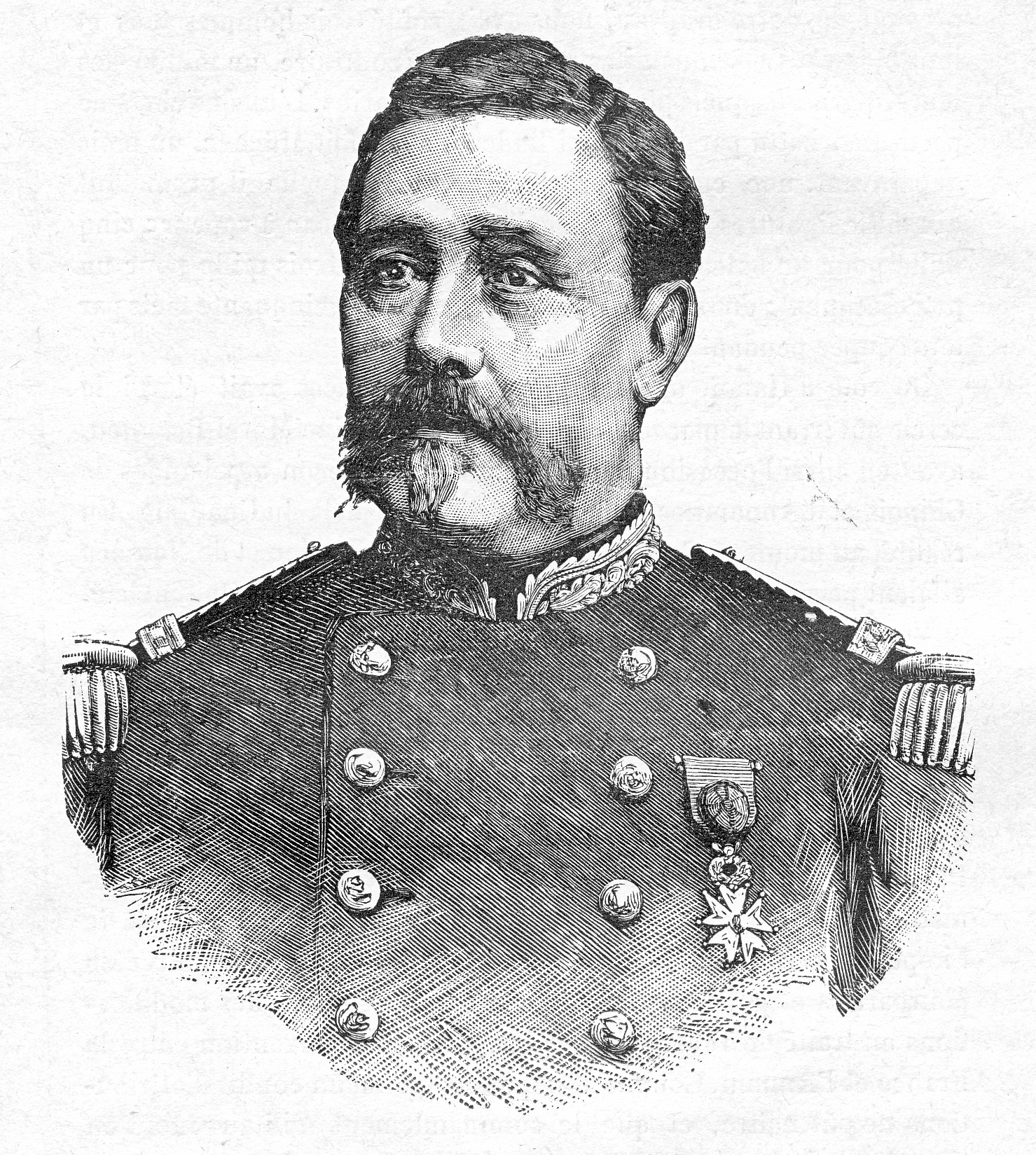
General Alexandre-Eugène Bouët (1833–1887)

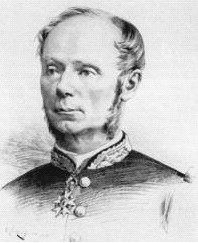
Admiral Anatole-Amédée-Prosper Courbet (1827–1885)

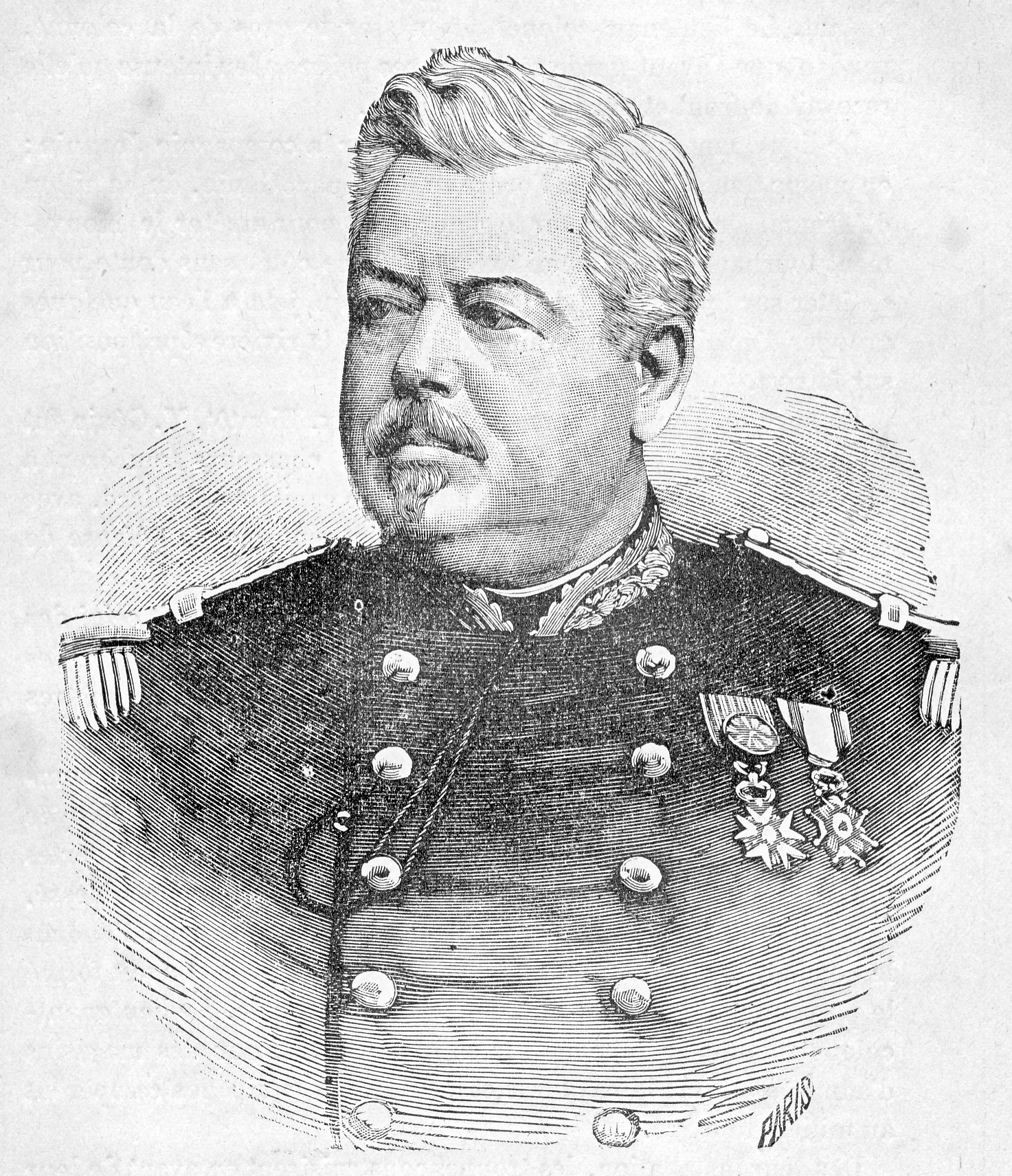
General Charles-Théodore Millot (1829–1889)

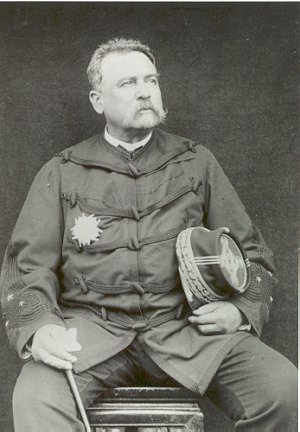
General Louis Brière de l'Isle (1827–1896)

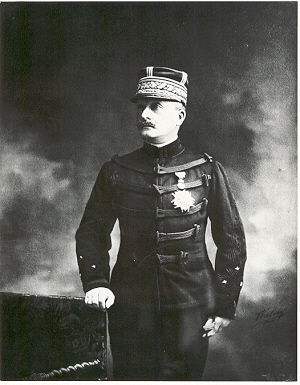
General François de Négrier (1839–1913)

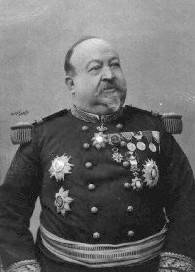
Colonel Ange-Laurent Giovanninelli (1839–1903)

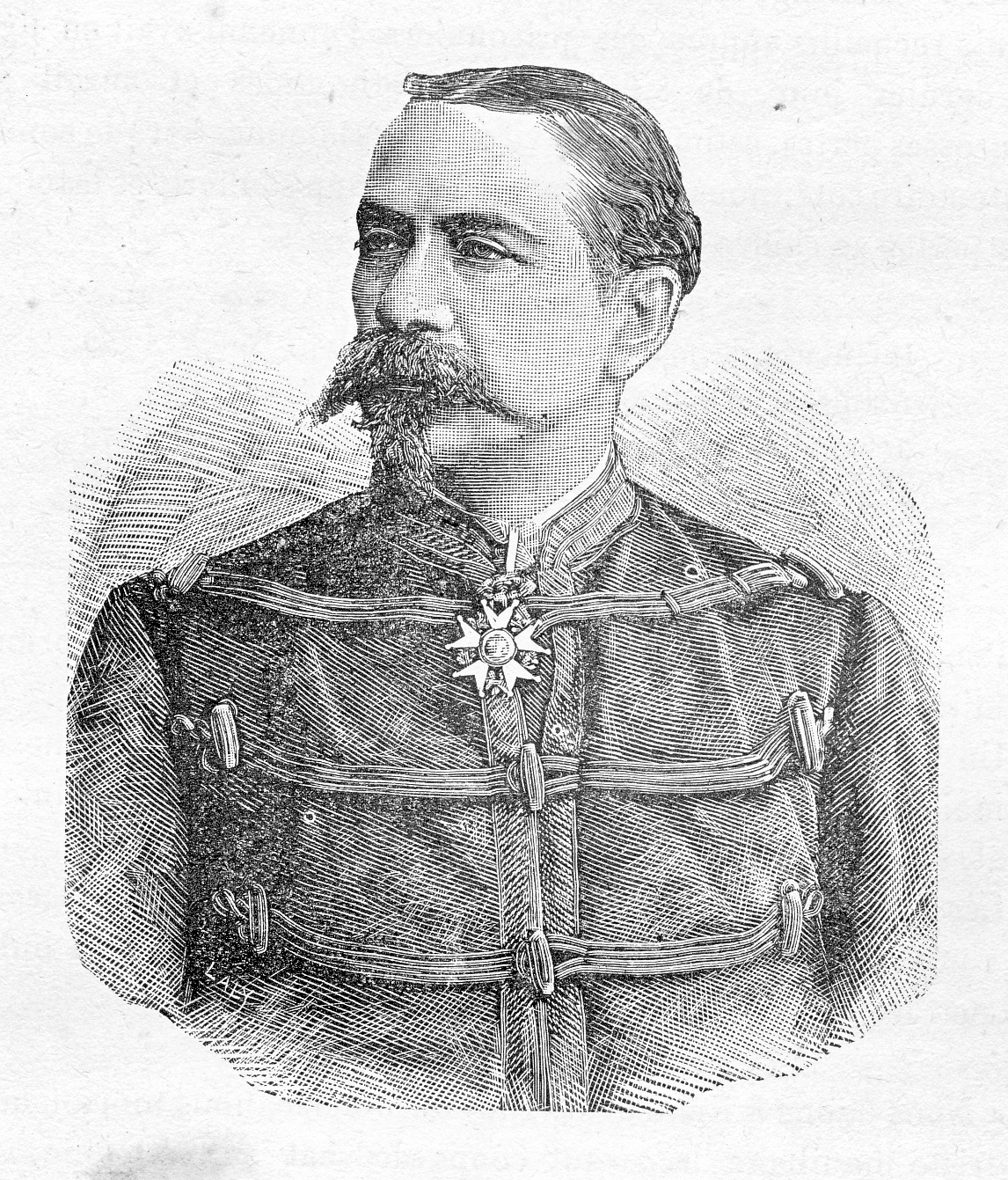
General Philippe-Marie-Henri Roussel de Courcy (1827–1887)
