= Veritas Bespoke =

Coordinates: 51°30′21″N 0°8′18.3″W

- Type: Ltd
- Industry: Bio Plastic
- Founded: Calgary, Alberta, Canada (2013)
- Headquarters: 384 Hoang Dieu, District 4, Ho Chi Minh City, Viet Nam
- Products: Bio Resin, eco friendly products
- Number of employees: 50
- Website: veritasbespoke.com

Veritas Bespoke is a company that manufactures and retails premium leather-soled shoes for men. The brand is founded in 2013 by the Vietnamese Canadian businessman Thanh Le and Thai Nguyen, the professional shoe cobbler in Calgary, Alberta, Canada. Veritas Bespoke has invented a new approach to the traditional shoe-making method: creating bespoke last from 3D scanning technology used in orthopedics footwear. In July 2013, Veritas Bespoke opened its boutique in Calgary. Two years later, Thanh and Nguyen opened their first store in Vietnam at 56 Le Thanh Ton Street, District 1, Ho Chi Minh City

== History ==
In the summer of 2012, Thanh Le, a chemical engineer with an MBA degree met Thai Nguyen, a cobbler, in Calgary. The two men shared the interest in shoe crafting and it was not long before the idea of creating custom-fit shoes that last long.

The duo spent days tracking down full-grain leather in France and Italy, and especially, the 3D technology used in making orthopaedic shoes. They invented a new bespoke making method. After continuous research, they found out that a virtual and accurate model of the foot created by a 3D scanner used in orthopaedics can be used to build custom-made shoes for individual. Although the process costs much time and effort, it ensures to make shoes that fit like a glove. Using a 3D scanner, a shoemaker can create a bespoke last based on your foot to make the footwear, which is called it 'functional shoes' since it will prevent bunion and callus. This new method takes only 3–4 weeks to make a pair of bespoke shoes, instead of 3–6 months in traditional bespoke making method At Veritas Bespoke, prices for bespoke shoes begin at US$1,400 with each added layer of customization priced separately. Apart from bespoke lines, they also have Ready-to-wear (RTW) and Made-To-Order (MTO) shoes according to customer personalization. For MTO, the finished product will be delivered within 2–4 weeks

== Present operations ==
In July 2013, Thanh and Nguyen opened their first store, named Veritas, in Calgary. In July 2015, they opened their first store in the heart of Ho Chi Minh City, Vietnam. Local people now can find high-end shoes made from the pioneering 3D foot scanning technology, full-grain leather imported from France and Italy. Veritas Bespoke usually uses Goodyear welting for both RTW, MTO and bespoke lines, also offers custom made service like patina, carving, and lifetime shoe care guarantee for all purchases. A pair of bespoke leather shoes costs from US$1,400. The average price for RTW is approximately from US$200 to US$500

== Gallery ==
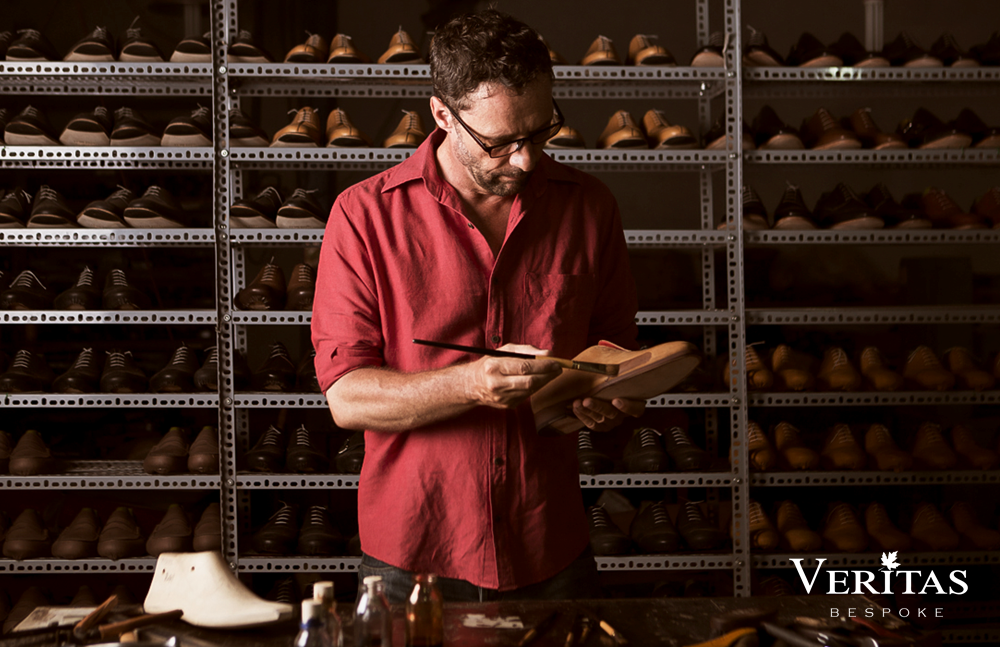
The process of shoemaking

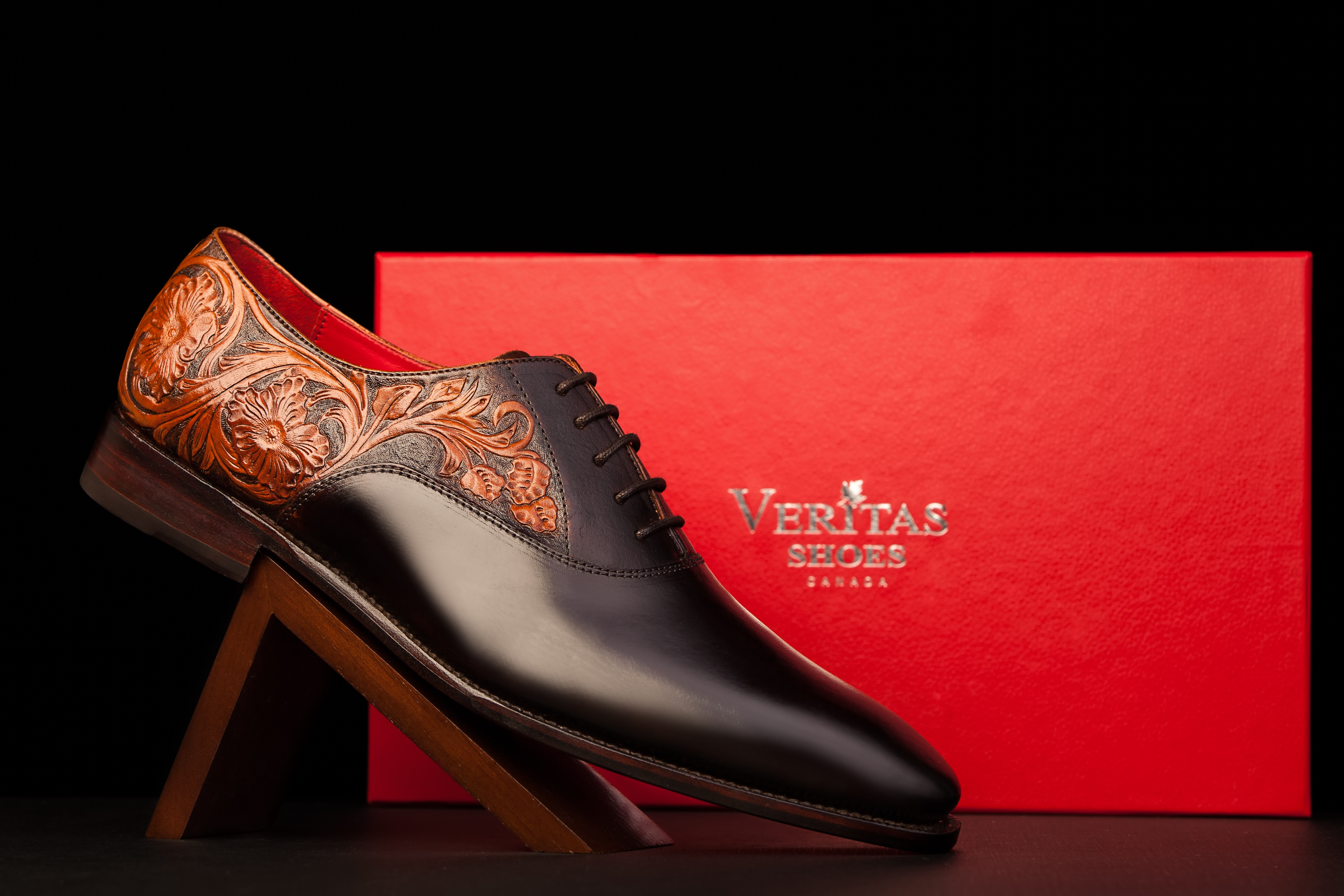
Custom-carving with Sheridan Pattern

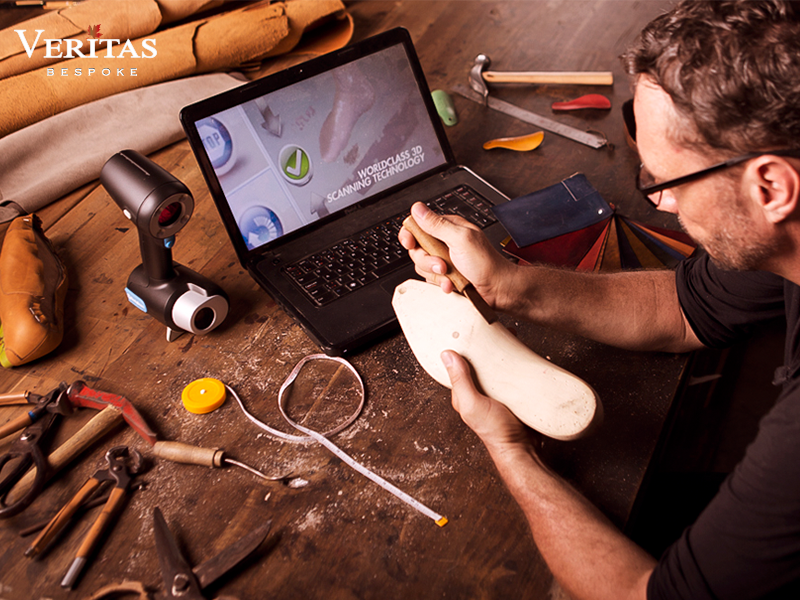
3D Orthopaedic Bespoke Last
