= Battle of Gia Cuc =

1883 battle during the French conquest of northern Vietnam (Tonkin Campaign)

- Part of the Tonkin campaign
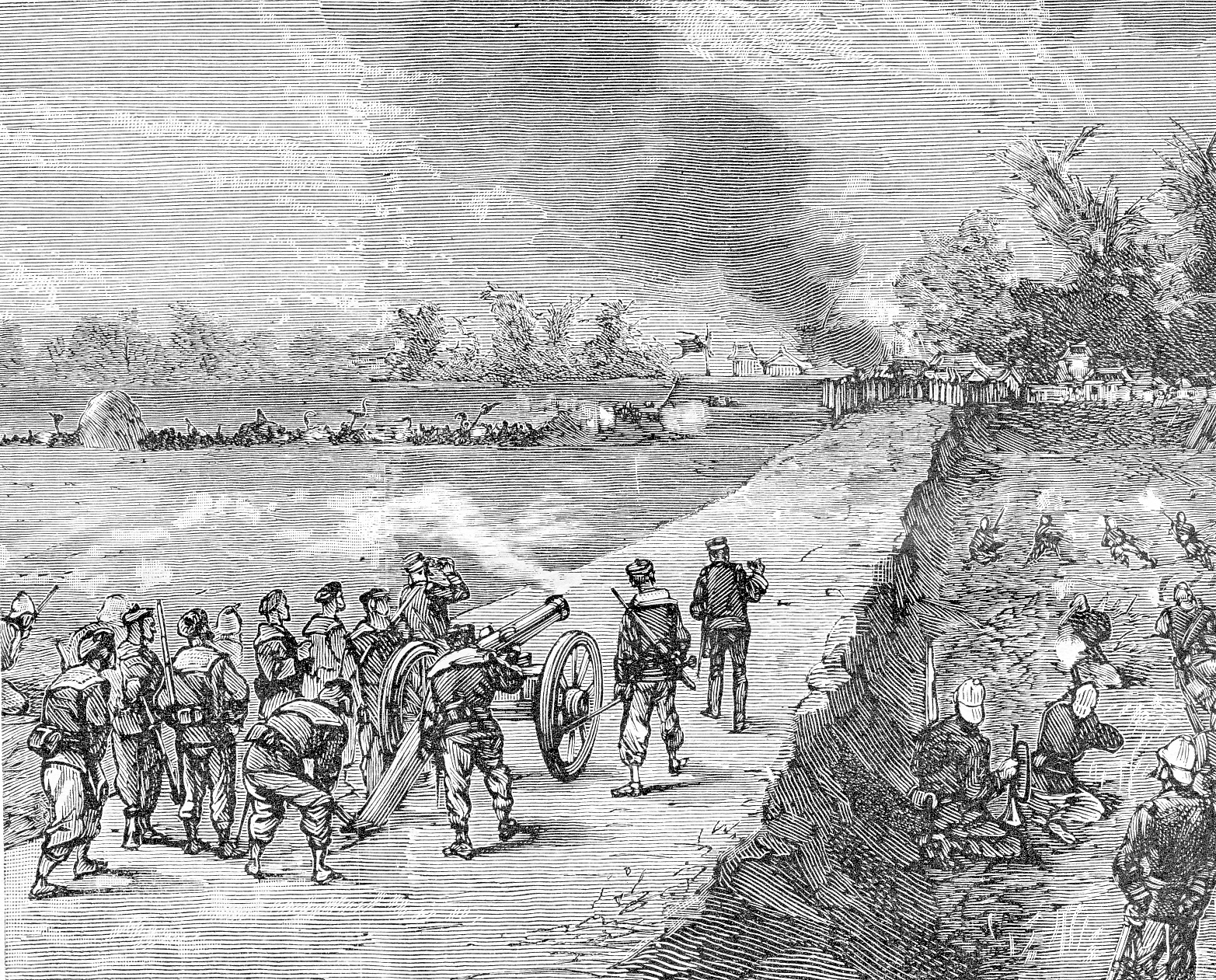
- A French naval gun, deployed on a dyke, supports a marine infantry attack on the Vietnamese positions at Gia Cuc
Date	27 and 28 March 1883
Location	Northern Vietnam
Result	French victory

Belligerents
France	Nguyễn dynasty Black Flag Army

Commanders and leaders
Berthe de Villers	Hoàng Kế Viêm; Liu Yongfu

Strength
1 gunboat 300 marine infantry 60 sailors	Around 6,000 Vietnamese soldiers

Casualties and losses
4 men wounded	Around 1,000 men killed and wounded

The Battle of Gia Cuc (Gia Quất), fought on 27 and 28 March 1883, during the Tonkin Campaign between the French and Vietnamese.

== Background ==
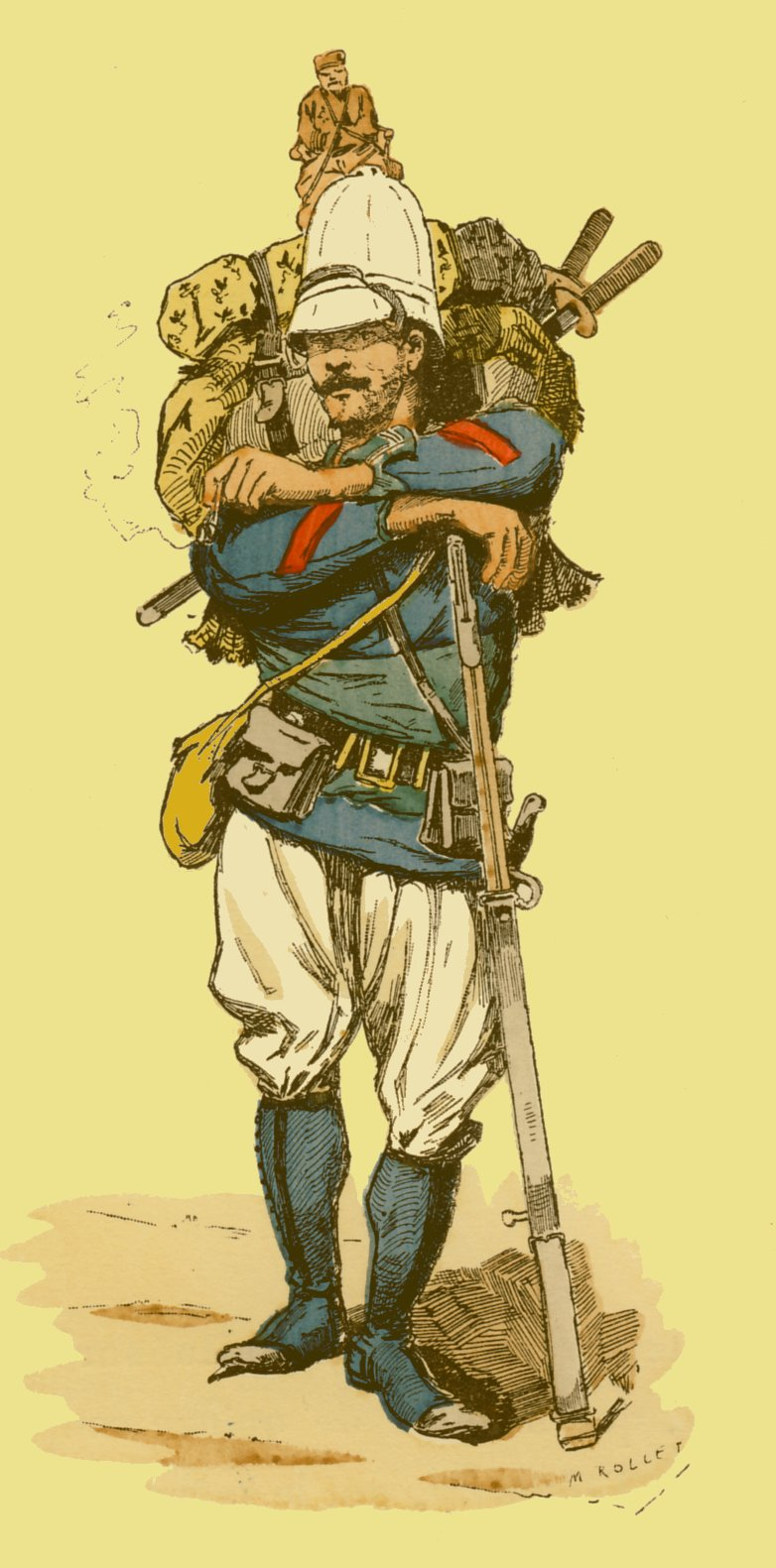
French marine infantryman in Tonkin, 1883

French intervention in northern Vietnam was precipitated by Commandant Henri Rivière, who was sent with a small French military force to Hanoi at the end of 1881 to investigate Vietnamese complaints against the activities of French merchants. In defiance of the instructions of his superiors, Rivière stormed the citadel of Hanoi on 25 April 1882. Although Rivière subsequently returned the citadel to Vietnamese control, his recourse to force was greeted with alarm in both Vietnam and China.

The Vietnamese government, unable to confront Rivière with its own ramshackle army, enlisted the help of Liu Yongfu, whose well-trained and seasoned Black Flag soldiers were to prove a thorn in the side of the French. The Vietnamese also bid for Chinese support. Vietnam had long been a tributary state of China, and China agreed to arm and support the Black Flags and to covertly oppose French operations in Tonkin. The Qing court also sent a strong signal to the French that China would not allow Tonkin to fall under French control. In the summer of 1882 troops of the Chinese Yunnan and Guangxi Armies crossed the border into Tonkin, occupying Lạng Sơn, Bắc Ninh, Hưng Hóa and other towns. The French minister to China, Frédéric Bourée, was so alarmed by the prospect of war with China that in November and December 1882, he negotiated a deal with the Chinese statesman Li Hongzhang to divide Tonkin into French and Chinese spheres of influence. Both negotiators were criticized for giving too much away, and the deal soon unravelled. It was never ratified in China, and in France Jules Ferry's incoming administration disavowed the agreement in March 1883 and recalled Bourée.

Rivière was disgusted at the deal cut by Bourée, and in early 1883 decided to force the issue. He had recently been sent a battalion of marine infantry from France, giving him just enough men to venture beyond Hanoi. On 27 March 1883, to secure his line of communications from Hanoi to the coast, Rivière captured the citadel of Nam Định with a flotilla of gunboats and a force of 520 French soldiers under his personal command.

The Battle of Gia Cuc was precipitated by an attempt by the Vietnamese commander Prince Hoàng Kế Viêm, with limited assistance from Liu Yongfu's Black Flag Army, to capture Hanoi from the French during Rivière's absence at Nam Định with the bulk of the available French forces.

== The battle ==
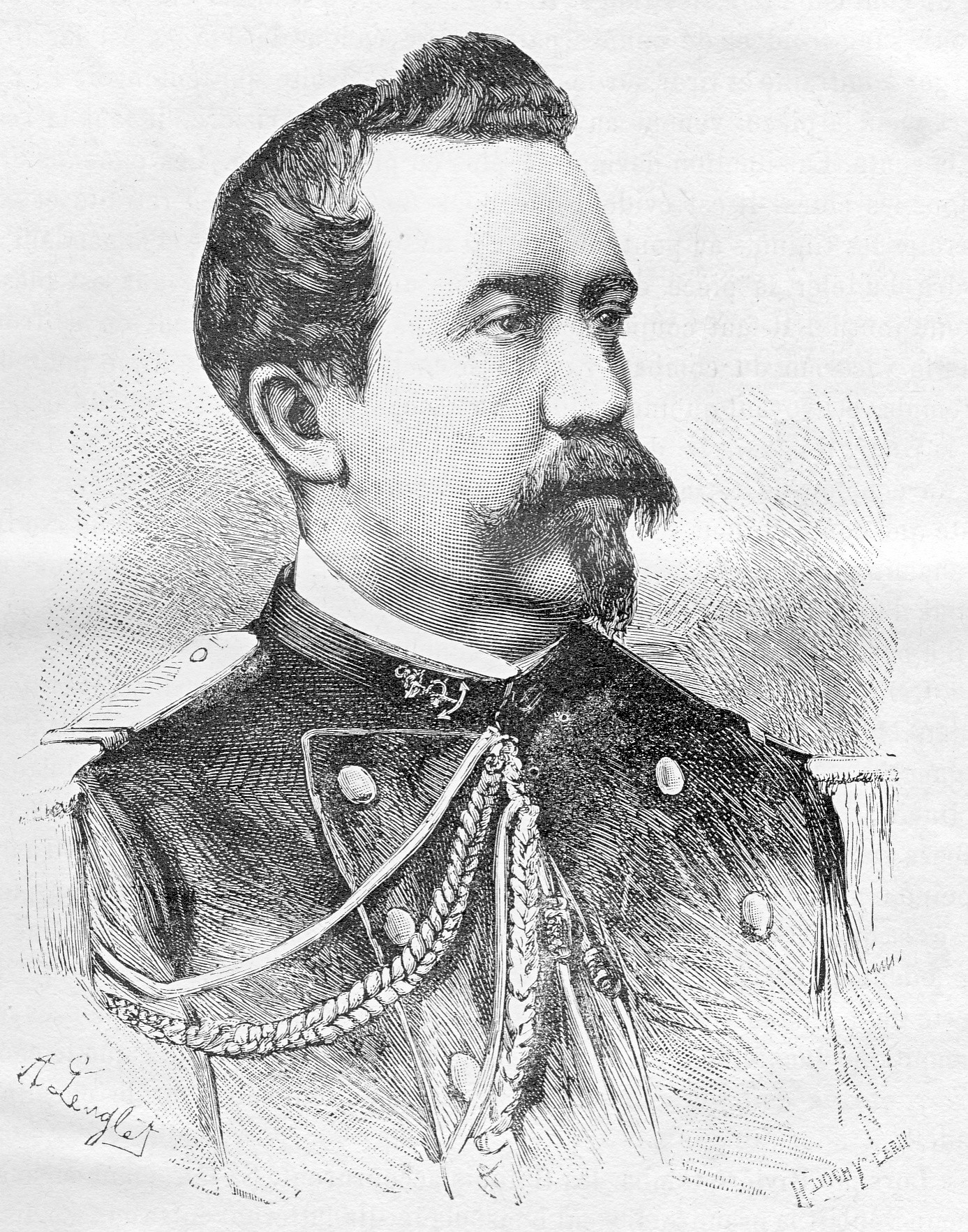
Chef de bataillon Berthe de Villers (1844–83)

On 27 and 28 March the commander of the Hanoi garrison, chef de bataillon Berthe de Villers, sallied out against Prince Hoang's Vietnamese army, around 6,000 strong, with two companies of marine infantry and a small force of sailors from the gunboat Léopard, leaving behind a single company of marine infantry to garrison the Royal Palace. (Note: The assault force under the command of Berthe de Villers included the 31st Company, 2nd Marine Infantry Regiment (Captain Caboureau) and the 30th Company, 4th Marine Infantry Regiment (Captain Martellière). The sailors from Léopard were commanded by enseignes de vaisseau Bladon and Le Bris. The Royal Palace was garrisonned by the 29th Company, 2nd Marine Infantry Regiment (Captain Retrouvey).)

Using intelligent fire and movement tactics and supported by Léopard's artillery, the French attacked the Vietnamese defences, captured the villages of Gia Thuy (Thượng Cát) and Gia Cuc (Gia Quất), and finally drove the Vietnamese from the battlefield. French casualties were 4 men wounded. The Vietnamese may have lost as many as 1,000 dead and wounded.

One of the factors in the Vietnamese defeat was the absence of serious pressure on the French from Liu Yongfu (Liu Yung-fu, 劉永福) and the Black Flag Army. Liu was supposed to attack Hanoi from the west while Prince Hòang descended from the north. However, the two men were on the coolest of terms, and Liu made only a feint attack on the French-held Royal Palace. This attack was easily beaten off by the French garrison.

== Significance ==
Berthe de Villers' remarkable victory at Gia Cuc, coupled with Rivière's simultaneous Capture of Nam Định, demoralised the Vietnamese, appreciably raised French prestige in Tonkin, and emboldened French policymakers to shrug off the growing prospects of direct Chinese intervention in Tonkin. Meanwhile, the failure of cooperation between Prince Hoang and Liu Yongfu alarmed the Chinese. The senior Chinese civil mandarin Tang Jingsong reconciled the two men in April 1883, and persuaded Liu Yongfu to take the field against the French with the Black Flag Army. The result, in May 1883, was the disastrous French defeat at the Battle of Paper Bridge, in which both Rivière and Berthe de Villers were killed.
