= Battle of Hanoi (1882) =

1882 unsanctioned capture of Hanoi by French naval officer Henri Rivière

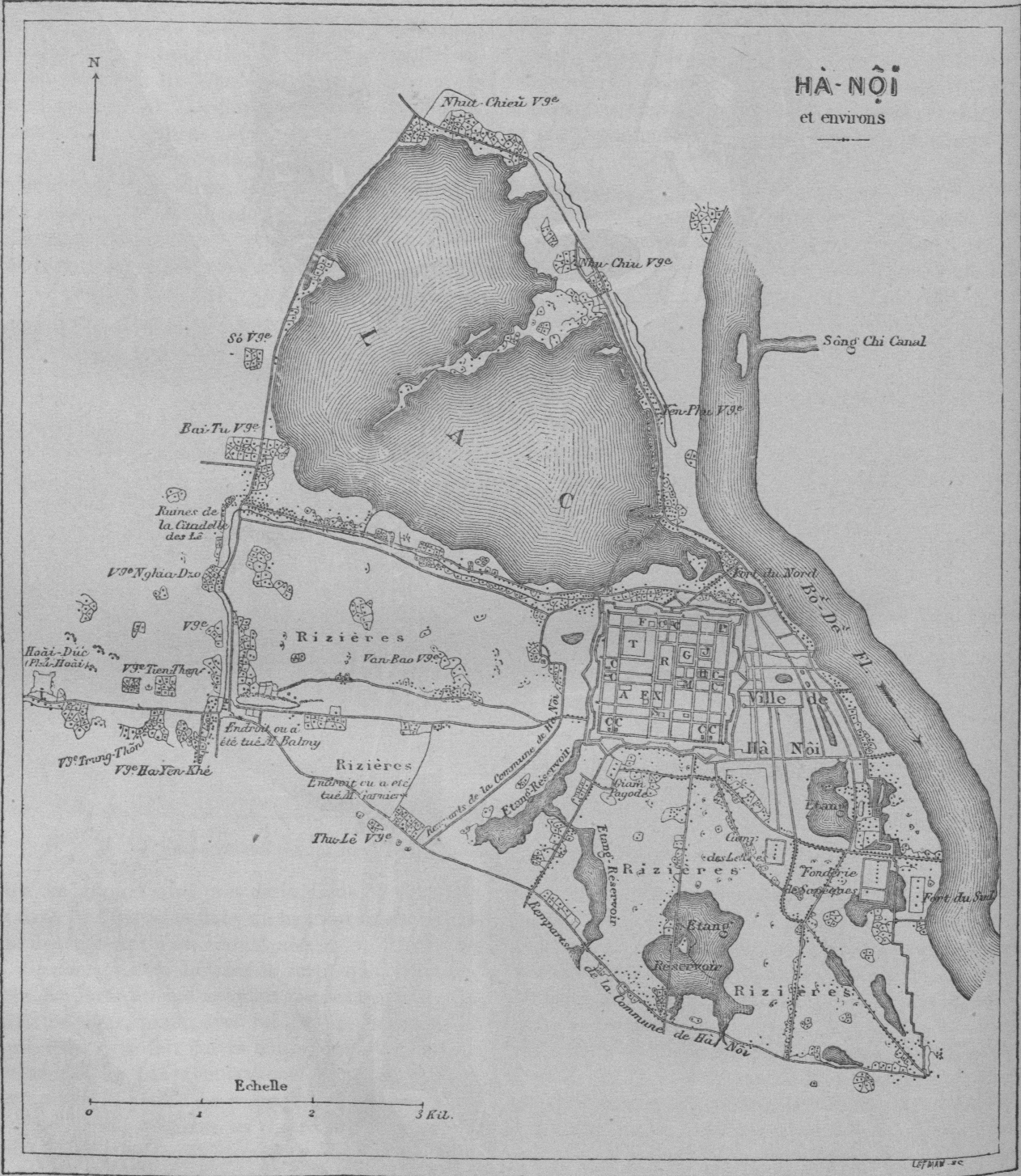
Date	25 April 1882
Location	Bắc Kỳ, Nguyễn dynasty
Result	French victory

Belligerents
(French Third Republic) France	Nguyễn dynasty

Commanders and leaders
Henri Rivière; Berthe de Villers	Hoàng Diệu †; Lê Trực

Strength
555 men: 405 marines; 130 sailors; 20 tirailleurs; 4 gunboats	A few thousand

Casualties and losses
4 wounded	40 killed 20 wounded

The Battle of Hanoi on 25 April 1882, was the illegal capture by French naval captain Henri Rivière, acting without his superiors' orders. The French handed the city back later.

The Citadel of Hanoi was almost totally unprepared and the entire attack lasted less than an hour, and ended with only four French soldiers wounded. The Nguyễn dynasty Vietnamese defenders suffered heavy losses including, at his own hand, Governor Hoàng Diệu, following the dispatch of a final message to the Emperor Tự Đức in Huế.

== Background ==
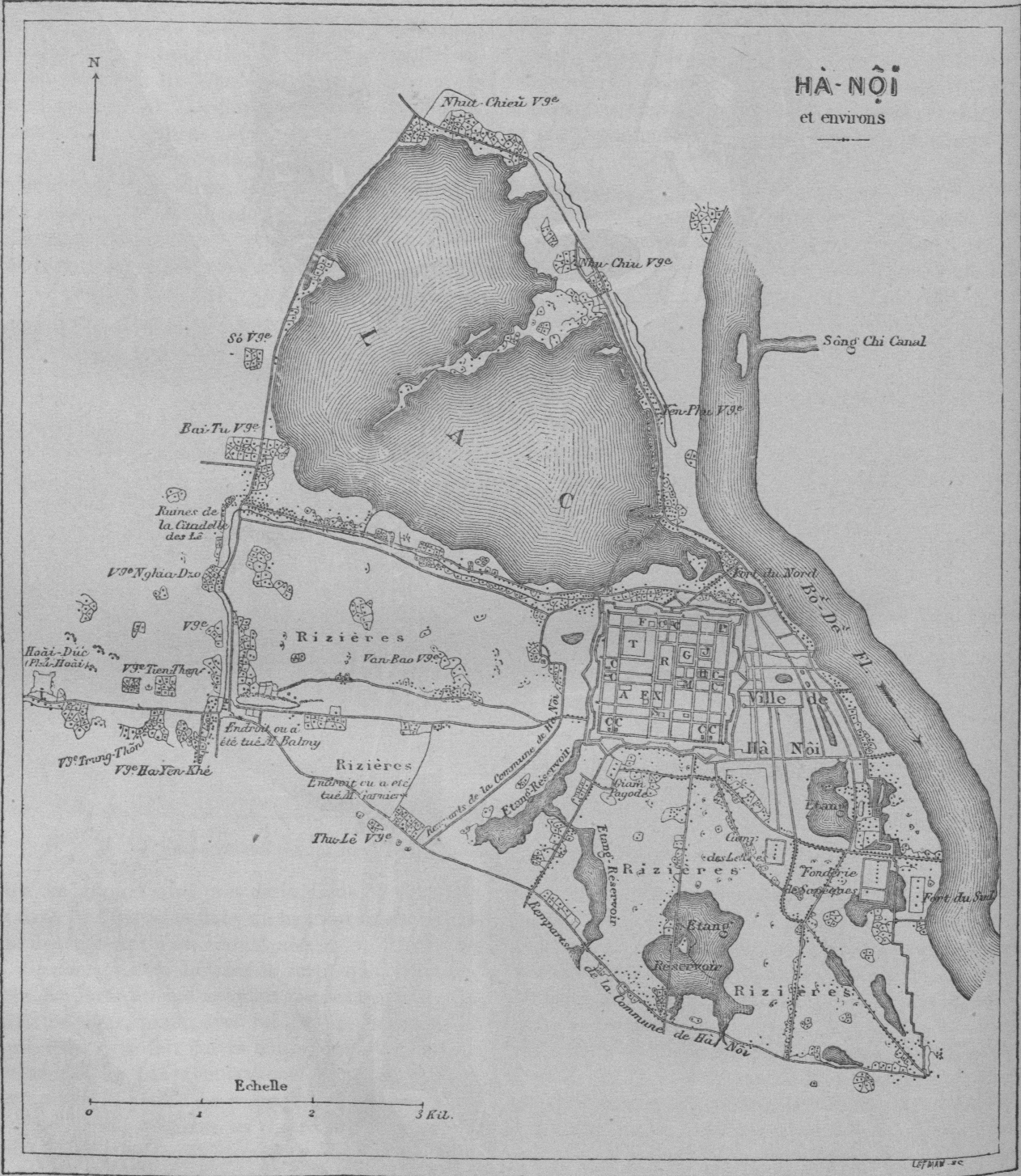
Map of Hà Nội in 1873

When Hoàng Diệu first assumed the Governor of Hà Ninh in early 1880, he recognized the important position of Hà Nội "as the throat of Bắc Hà", and "once Hà Nội collapsed fall, the other provinces will also fall apart."

The Nguyễn dynasty built Hà Nội citadel following the French Vauban style from the late 17th century. The citadel was built in a square shape with each side 1 km long. The wall was built of box bricks, the bottom layer was made of bluestone, the upper layer was made of laterite. The citadel has 5 gates: Northern Gate, Eastern Gate, Southeastern Gate, Southwestern Gate, and Western Gate.

Using the excuse that the Nguyễn dynasty did not respect the Treaty of Saigon (1874), continued to have relations with the Qing dynasty, tolerated the Black Flag Army, hindered trade on the Red River as well as discrimination against overseas French. In early March 1882, the Governor of Nam Kỳ, Le Myre de Vilers, sent Captain Henri Rivière leading 2 gunboats carried 2 marines companies, 1 cannon section, 1 tirailleur section to Bắc Kỳ.

On 1 April 1882, the two gunboats, La Drac and La Parseval, arrived in Hải Phòng. On 3 April 1882, French reinforcement landed in Hà Nội and stationed at Đồn Thủy concession (a former base of Đại Nam navy). Henri Rivière announced that he was leading troops to deal with the Black Flag Army and protect overseas French. At that time, the French had two companies of marines and infantry, commanded by Major Berthe de Villers to protect the French Consulate.

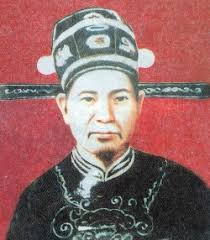
Governor Hoàng Diệu

On the first day of Henri Riève's arrival in Hà Nội, Hoàng Diệu authorized mandarins Tuần vũ and Án sát to welcome him. Seeing the French army coming in large numbers and intending to station in the citadel, Hoàng Diệu urged the defense and ordered to bring back more troops from surrounding provinces. The commander of the French army asked the Đại Nam side to withdraw their troops and cancel all defense work, of course Hoàng Diệu did not accept. There were a few French officers who wanted to walk into the citadel, but the guards wouldn't let them in. Henri Riève immediately ordered naval commander Fiaschi to take a sailors company and lieutenant De Motoignault to take a half marines company from Hải Phòng to Hà Nội on four gunboats: La Fanfare, La Suprise, La Massue, La Carabine.

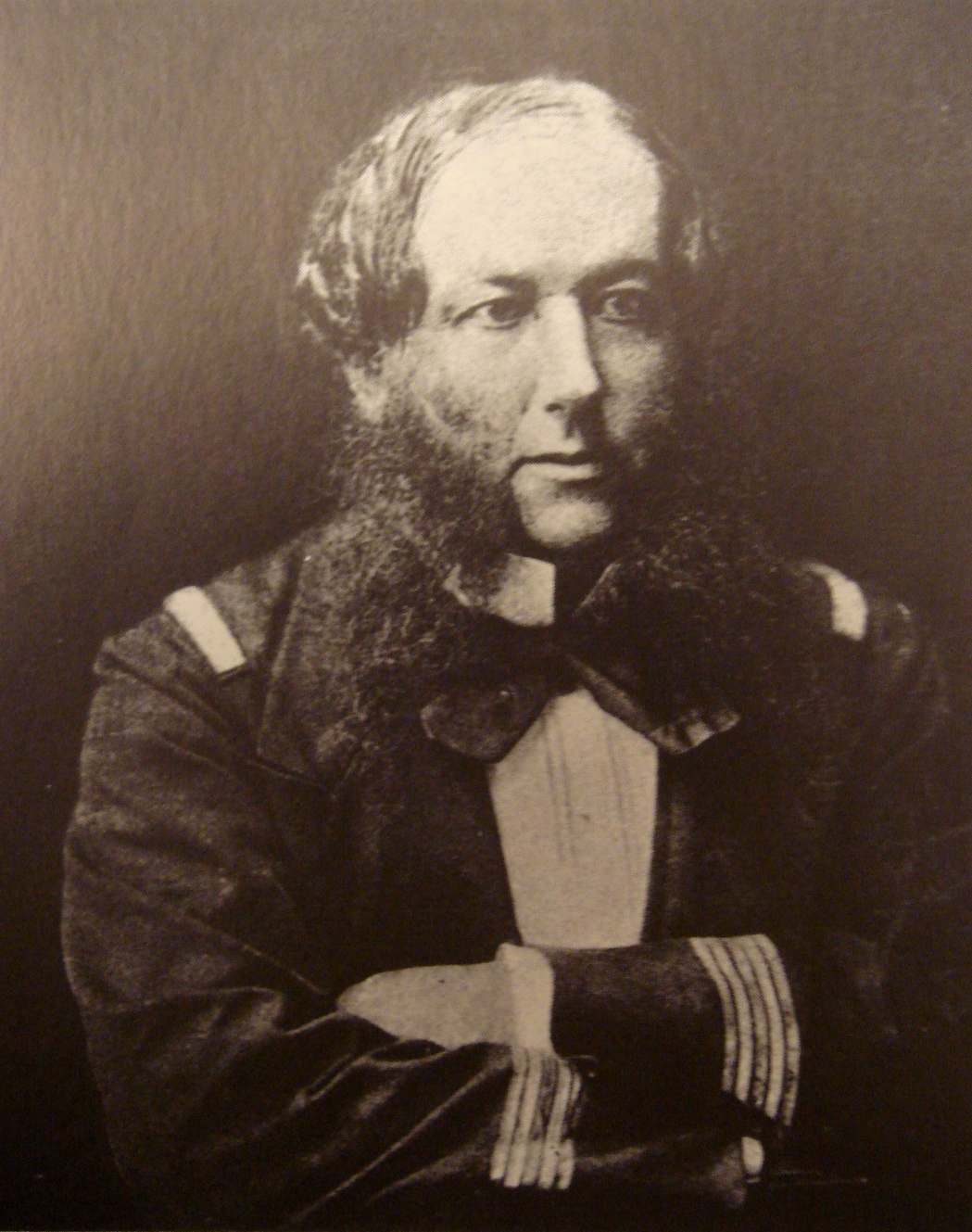
Captain Henri Rivière

== Battle ==
On 25 April 1882, Captain Rivière sent Governor Hoàng an ultimatum at 5 A.M, declared that until 8 A.M, without a troop withdrawal, and the Vietnamese military officers do not come to surrender at Đồn Thủy, the French will attack the citadel and will rearrange everything so that there is no harm to them.

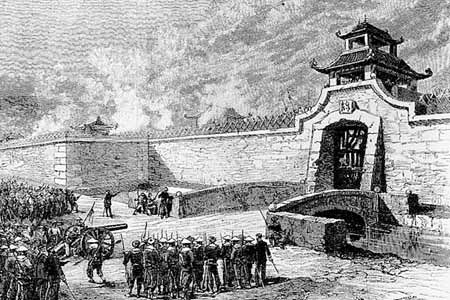
French artillery was destroying gate of Hanoi citadel in 1882

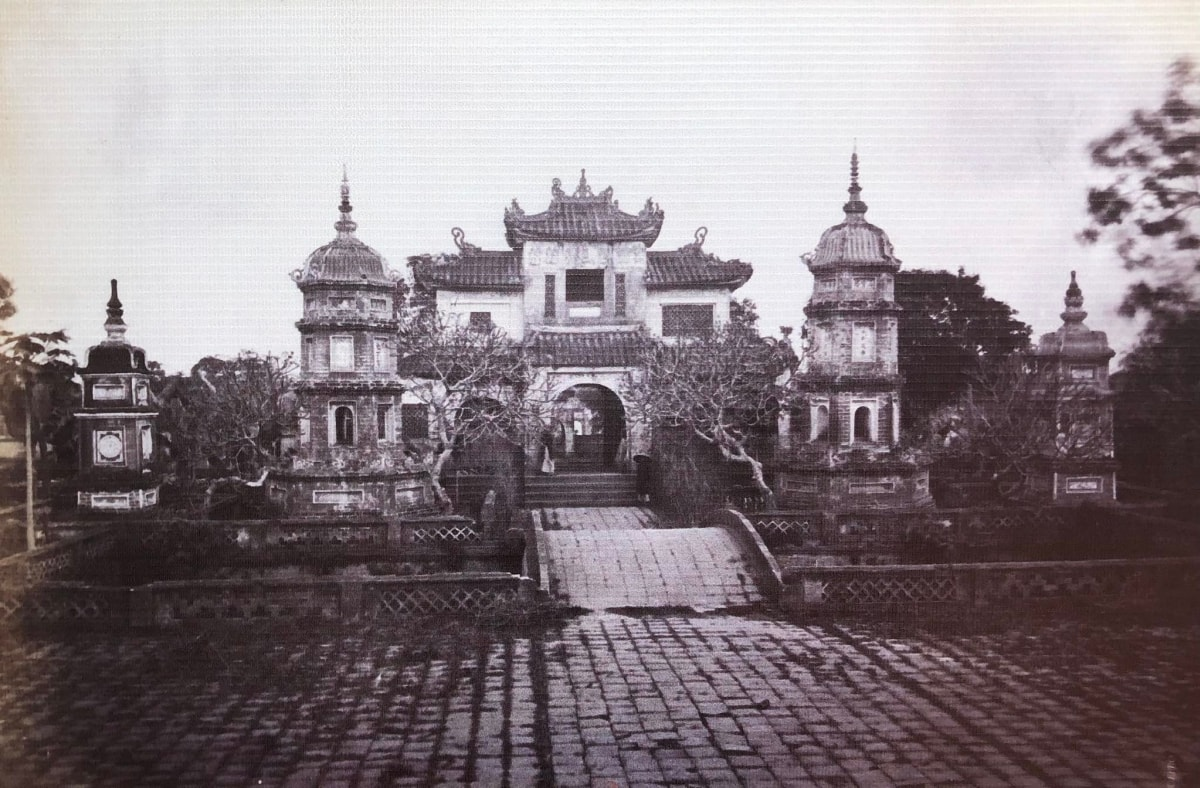
Báo Ân pagoda, built in 1842 and destroyed by French in 1888 to build the city's post office.
