= Battle of Cầu Giấy (1883) =

Battle of Cầu Giấy (Paper Bridge)
- Part of the Tonkin campaign
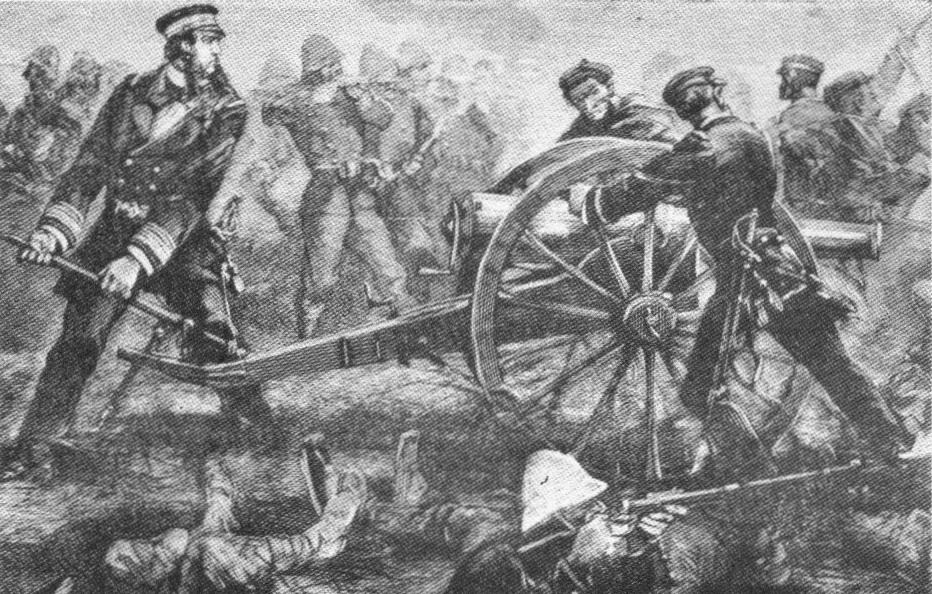
- Commandant Henri Rivière attempts to rescue a bogged French cannon at Paper Bridge.
Date	19 May 1883
Location	Cầu Giấy, near Hanoi, northern Vietnam (now part of urban Hanoi)
Result	Black Flag victory

Belligerents
French Third Republic	Black Flag Army

Commanders and leaders
(French Third Republic) Henri Rivière † (French Third Republic) Berthe de Villers †	Liu Yongfu; Hoàng Kế Viêm

Strength
550 men (marine infantry, sailors and artillery)	Around 1,500 Black Flag soldiers

Casualties and losses
35 dead, 52 wounded, most officers killed 3 Guns Captured	Approximately 30 dead, similar number of wounded

The Battle of Cầu Giấy or Paper Bridge, fought on 19 May 1883, was one of the numerous clashes during the Tonkin Campaign (1883–86) between the French and the Black Flags. A small French force under the command of capitaine de vaisseau Henri Rivière attacked a strong Black Flag defensive position near the village of Cầu Giấy a few miles to the west of Hanoi, known to the French as Paper Bridge (Pont de Papier). After initial successes, the French were eventually enveloped on both wings, and were only with difficulty able to regroup and fall back to Hanoi. Rivière and several other senior officers were killed in the action.

== Background ==
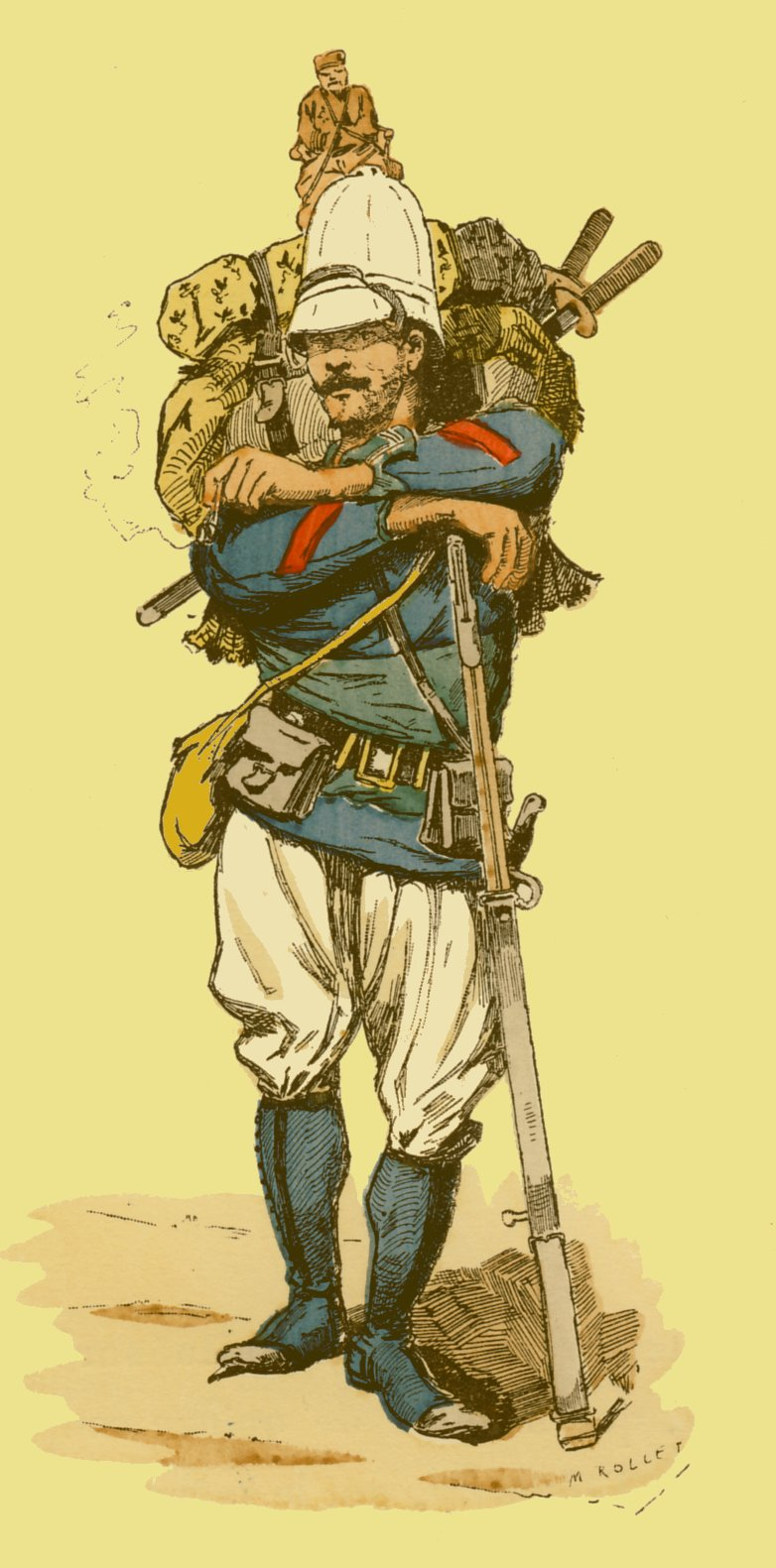
French marine infantryman in Tonkin, 1883

French interest in northern Vietnam dated from the 1860s, when France annexed several southern provinces of Vietnam to become the colony of Cochinchina, laying the foundations for its later colonial empire in Indochina. French explorers followed the course of the Red River through northern Vietnam to its source in Yunnan, arousing hopes that a profitable overland trade route could be established with China, bypassing the treaty ports of the Chinese coastal provinces. The main obstacle to the realisation of this dream was the Black Flag Army, a well-organized bandit force under a formidable leader, Liu Yongfu (Liu Yung-fu, 劉永福), which was levying exorbitant dues on trade on the Red River between Sơn Tây and the town of Lào Cai on the Yunnan border.

French intervention in northern Vietnam was precipitated by Commandant Henri Rivière, who was sent with a small French military force to Hanoi at the end of 1881 to investigate Vietnamese complaints against the activities of French merchants. In defiance of the instructions of his superiors, Rivière stormed the citadel of Hanoi on 25 April 1882. Although Rivière subsequently returned the citadel to Vietnamese control, his recourse to force was greeted with alarm in both Vietnam and China.

The Vietnamese government, unable to confront Rivière with its own ramshackle army, enlisted the help of Liu Yongfu, whose well-trained and seasoned Black Flag soldiers were to prove a thorn in the side of the French. The Black Flags had already inflicted one humiliating defeat on a French force commanded by lieutenant de vaisseau Francis Garnier in 1873. Like Rivière in 1882, Garnier had exceeded his instructions and attempted to intervene militarily in northern Vietnam. Liu Yongfu had been called in by the Vietnamese government, and ended a remarkable series of French victories against the Vietnamese by defeating Garnier’s small French force beneath the walls of Hanoi. Garnier was killed in this battle, and the French government later disavowed his expedition.

The Vietnamese also bid for Chinese support. Vietnam had long been a tributary state of China, and China agreed to arm and support the Black Flags and to covertly oppose French operations in Tonkin. The Qing court also sent a strong signal to the French that China would not allow Tonkin to fall under French control. In the summer of 1882 troops of the Chinese Yunnan and Guangxi armies crossed the border into Tonkin, occupying Lạng Sơn, Bắc Ninh, Hưng Hóa and other towns. The French minister to China, Frédéric Bourée, was so alarmed by the prospect of war with China that in November and December 1882 he negotiated a deal with the Chinese statesman Li Hongzhang to divide Tonkin into French and Chinese spheres of influence. The Vietnamese were not consulted by either party to these negotiations.

== Nam Dinh and Gia Cuc ==
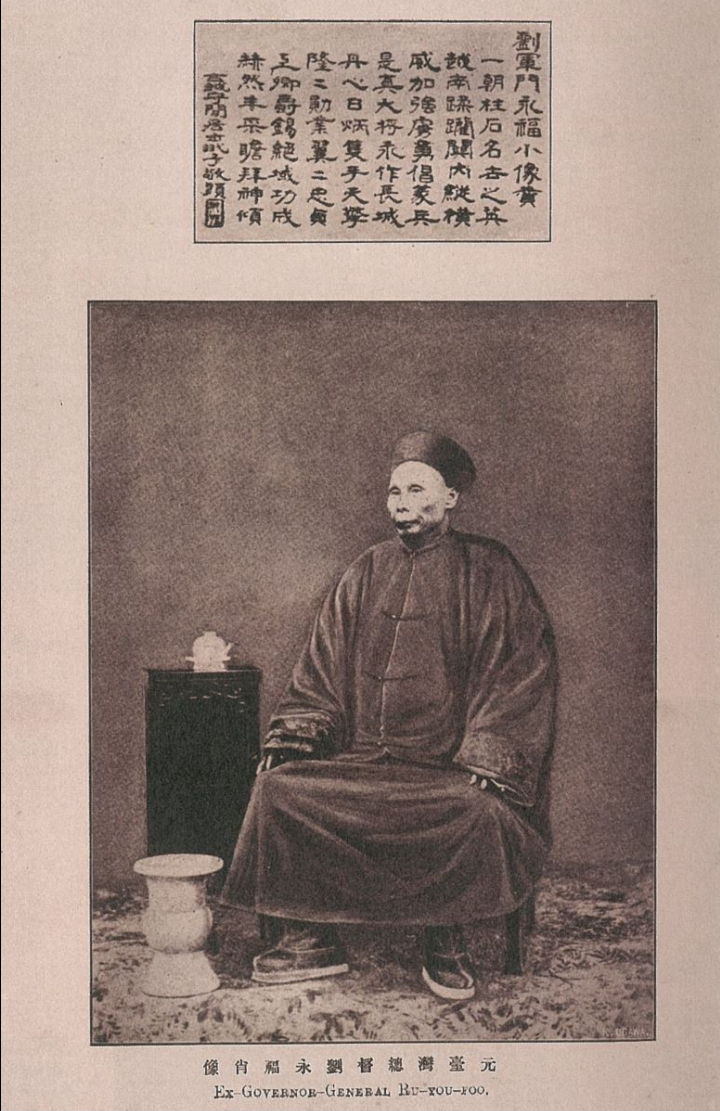
Liu Yongfu (1837–1917)

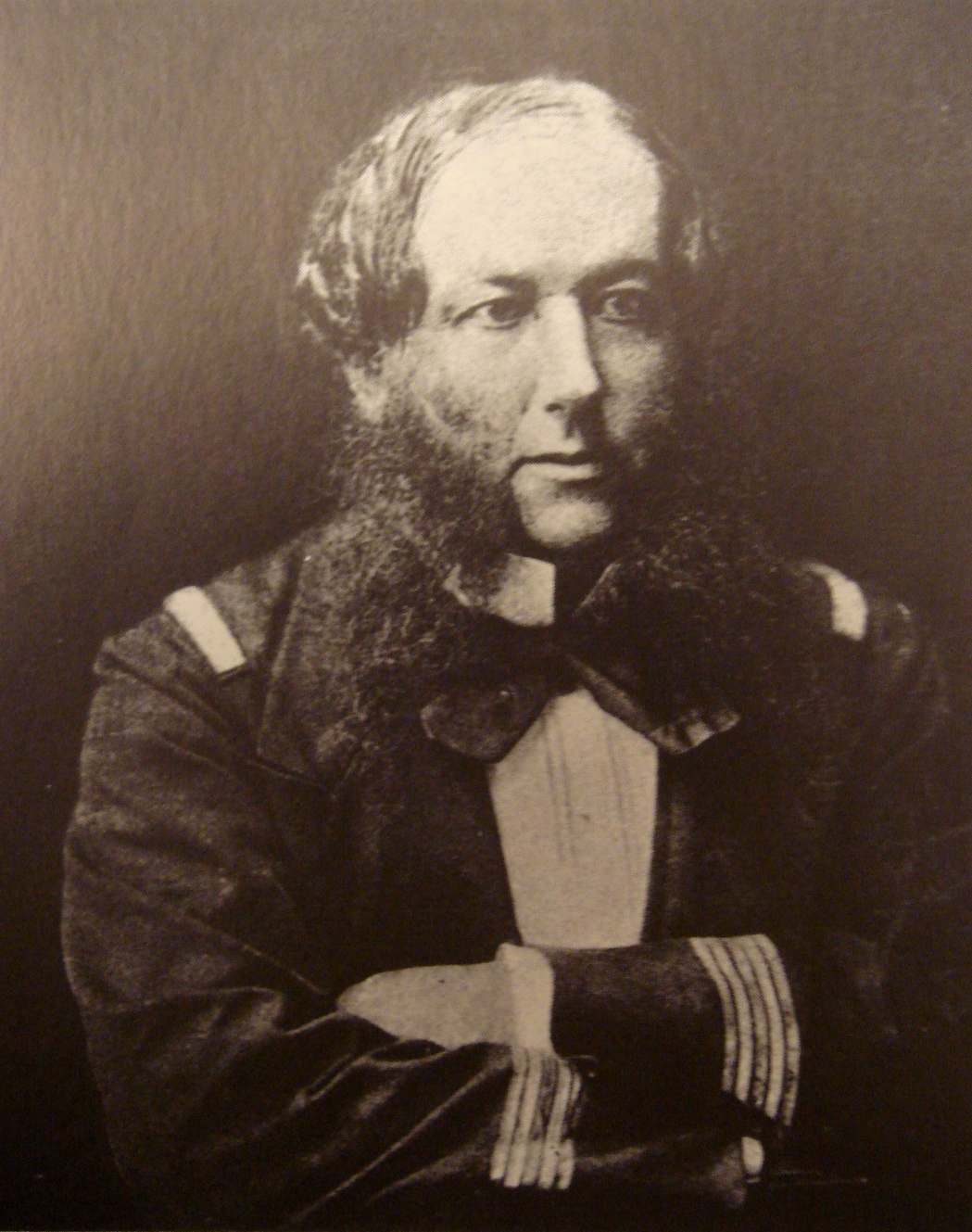
Henri Rivière (1827–83)

Rivière was disgusted at the deal cut by Bourée, and in early 1883 decided to force the issue. He had recently been sent a battalion of marine infantry from France, giving him just enough men to venture beyond Hanoi. On 27 March 1883, to secure his line of communications from Hanoi to the coast, Rivière captured the citadel of Nam Định with a force of 520 French soldiers under his personal command. During his absence at Nam Dinh the Black Flags and Vietnamese made an attack on Hanoi, but they were repulsed by chef de bataillon Berthe de Villers in the Battle of Gia Cuc on 28 March. Rivière was jubilant: 'This will force them to take forward their Tonkin Question!'

In April 1883 the Chinese civil mandarin Tang Jingsong, who had been sent to Vietnam in 1882 to assess the Vietnamese government's ability to resist French encroachment in Tonkin, reconciled the quarrel between Liu and Hoang and persuaded Liu to take the field in earnest with the Black Flag Army. Liu's decision to commit the Black Flag Army against the French was to have profound consequences, setting in train a chain of events that culminated eventually in the Sino-French War (August 1884–April 1885).

The Battle of Paper Bridge was precipitated by a challenge by Liu Yongfu, who posted up placards in Hanoi on 10 May 1883 daring Rivière to come out and meet the Black Flag Army in the open field:

The valiant warrior Liu, general and military governor of the three provinces, has decided to wage war. He makes this proclamation to the French bandits: Everyone knows you are thieves. Other nations despise you. Whenever you come to a country, you claim that you have come to preach the faith, but you really wish to stir up the inhabitants with false rumours. You claim that you have come to trade, but in fact you are plotting to take over the country. You act like wild animals. You are as fierce as tigers and wolves. Ever since you came to Vietnam, you have seized cities and killed governors. Your crimes are as numerous as the hairs on the head. You have taken over the customs and seized the revenues. This crime deserves death. The inhabitants have been reduced to misery, and the country is nearly ruined. God and man both loathe you. Heaven and earth both reject you. I have now been ordered to wage war. My three armies are massed like clouds. My rifles and cannon are as many as the trees of the forest. We are eager to attack you in your devil’s den and to suppress all disloyal subjects. But the country’s welfare weighs heavily with me. I cannot bear to turn Hanoi into a battlefield, in case I ruin its merchants and people. So I am first making this proclamation: You French bandits, if you think you are strong enough, send your rabble of soldiers to Phủ Hoài to fight in the open field with my tiger warriors, and then we will see who is the strongest. If you are afraid to come, cut off the heads of your chief men and present them to me. Then give back the cities you have taken. I am a merciful commander, and I will let you miserable ants live. But if you delay, my army will take your city and kill you all, and not even a blade of grass will mark where you stood. You must choose between happiness and disaster. Life is but a step away from death. Mark my words well.

«雄威大将军兼署三宣提督刘，为悬示决战事，照你法匪，素称巨寇，为国所耻。每到他国，假称传道，实则蛊惑村愚，淫欲纵横。借名通商，实则阴谋土地。行则譬 如禽兽，心则竟似虎狼。自抵越南，陷城戕官，罪难了发，占关夺税，恶不胜诛。以致民不聊生，国几穷窘，神民共怒，天地难容。本将军奉命讨贼，三军云集，枪 炮如林，直讨尔鬼祟，扫清丑类。第国家之大事，不忍以河内而作战场，唯恐波及于商民，为此先行悬示。尔法匪既称本领，率乌合之众，与我虎旅之师在怀德府属 旷野之地以作战场，两军相对，以决雌雄。倘尔畏惧不来，即宜自斩尔等统辖之首递来献纳，退还各处城池，本将军好生之德，留你蚊虫。倘若迟疑不决，一旦兵临 城下，寸草不留，祸福尤关，死生在即，尔等熟思之。切切特示！» [9]

Rivière believed that French prestige required him to respond to this challenge, and at dawn on 19 May led a column of around 450 French soldiers and sailors to attack the Black Flag Army in its positions at Phu Hoai, a few miles west of Hanoi. The column consisted of two companies of marine infantry, the landing companies of the French warships Victorieuse and Villars, and three artillery pieces. (Note: Rivière’s column included the 31st Company, 2nd Marine Infantry Regiment (Captain Caboureau), the 24th Company, 3rd Marine Infantry Regiment (Captain Jacquin), the landing companies of Victorieuse and Villars (lieutenants de vaisseau Pelletier de Ravinières and Sentis), 20 Cochinchinese riflemen (2nd Lieutenant Daim), two 65-millimetre cannon and a Hotchkiss canon-revolver (lieutenant de vaisseau Pissère and enseigne de vaisseau Le Bris), a small field hospital and a demolition party (capitaine de génie Guénot). Rivière left a small garrison at Hanoi, consisting of the 29th Company, 2nd Marine Infantry Regiment (Captain Retrouvey), the landing company of Hamelin (enseigne de vaisseau de Driésen), 19 marine artillery gunners and troops unfit to march.) The French plan was discovered by Liu Yongfu's spies, and the Black Flag Army ambushed the French column near the village of Cầu Giấy at Paper Bridge (Pont de Papier), a bridge across a small river that took its name from a nearby paper mill. The Black Flags were deployed just to the west of Paper Bridge, in the villages of Trung Thong, Ha Yen Ke and Thien Thong. All three villages were surrounded by thick bamboo groves and clumps of trees, providing excellent cover for the Black Flags and also allowing Liu Yongfu to manoeuvre his men without being observed by the French.

== The battle of Paper Bridge ==
The French column set out from Hanoi at dawn and reached Paper Bridge at around 7.30 a.m. Rivière was unwell, and the column was under the direct command of chef de bataillon Berthe de Villers, an excellent professional soldier who had won a spectacular victory against the Vietnamese only seven weeks earlier at the Battle of Gia Cuc. While crossing the bridge, the French vanguard came under fire from Black Flag skirmishers. Berthe de Villers immediately deployed his men into line and pushed forward against the Black Flags, clearing them from the villages of Ha Yen Ke and Thien Thong. Liu Yongfu brought up his reserves, waited until the enemy line was fully committed, and launched a sudden counterattack against the French right wing. A Black Flag regiment trotted smartly into position with rifles at the slope, deployed into line, knelt down and fired a series of accurate volleys at close range. Berthe de Villers was mortally wounded in this engagement, and Rivière assumed direct command of the French column.

To avoid being encircled, Rivière ordered his men to retreat and regroup on the far side of Paper Bridge. The French retreat was initially conducted in good order, by echelons, and was covered by the three French cannon. However, disaster struck when one of the cannons overturned with the force of its recoil. Rivière and his officers rushed forward to help the gunners to right it, and the Black Flags fired a volley into this struggling mass of men. The volley killed one French officer and wounded Rivière and several of his aides. Seeing the French line in confusion, the Black Flags surged forward and drove back the French rearguard. During the fighting Rivière was killed. Complete catastrophe was only averted by the coolness of lieutenant de vaisseau Pissère, who assumed command of the demoralised French column, deployed the French infantry behind a dyke on the eastern side of Paper Bridge, and beat off a number of attempts by the Black Flags to cross the bridge and follow up their victory. The battle eventually died down, and Pissère marched the defeated French column back to Hanoi in good order.

== Casualties ==
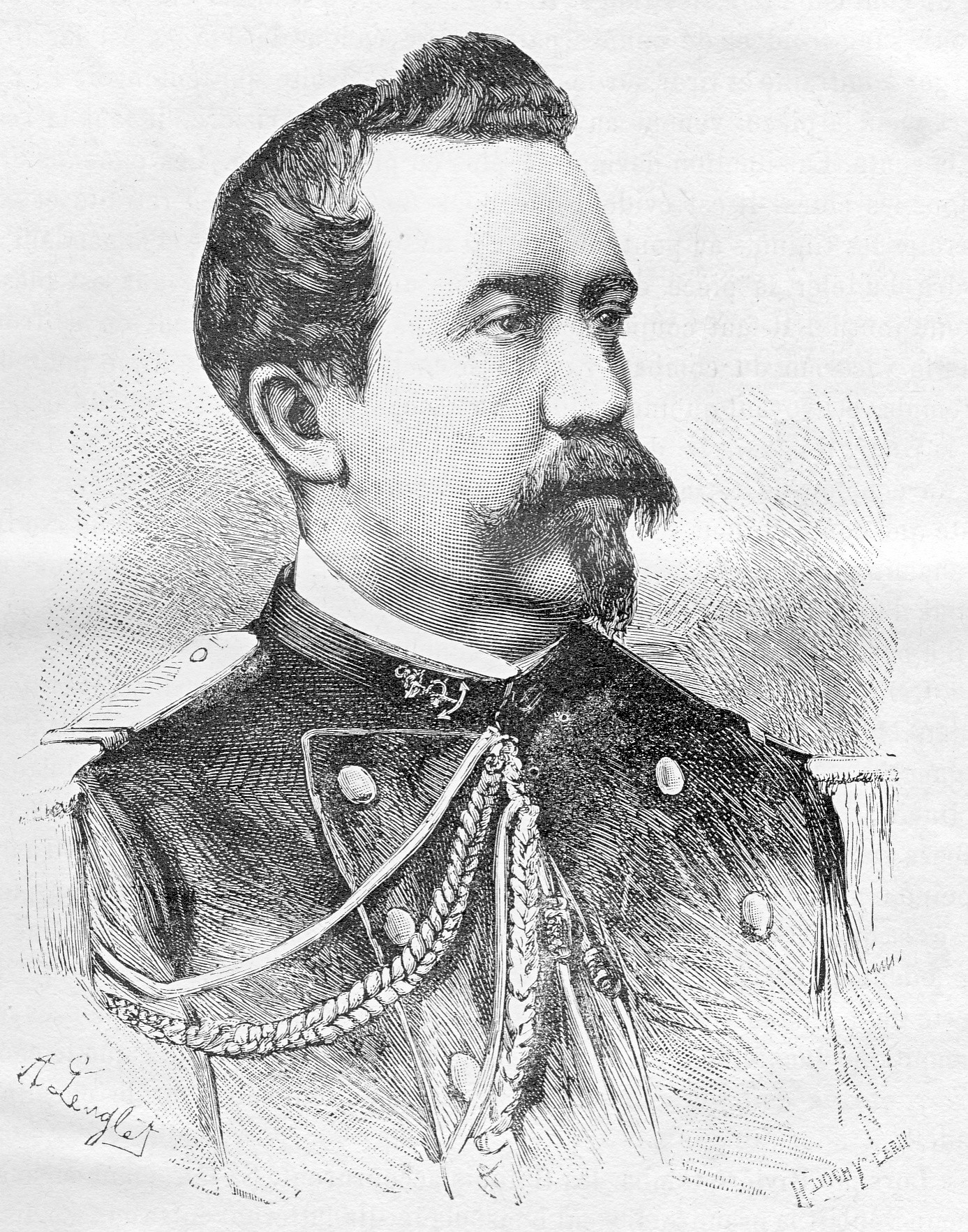
Chef de bataillon Berthe de Villers (1844–83), mortally wounded at Paper Bridge

French casualties in the Battle of Paper Bridge were 5 officers and 30 men killed, and 6 officers and 46 men wounded. Besides Rivière himself, the dead included chef de bataillon Berthe de Villers, Captain Jacquin, lieutenant de vaisseau Héral de Brisis and Midshipman Moulun.

Casualties in the Black Flag Army were around 50 dead and 56 wounded out of around 1,500 men engaged, and included two battalion commanders, Yang Zhu'en (楊著恩) and Wu Fengdian (吳鳳典).

== Significance ==
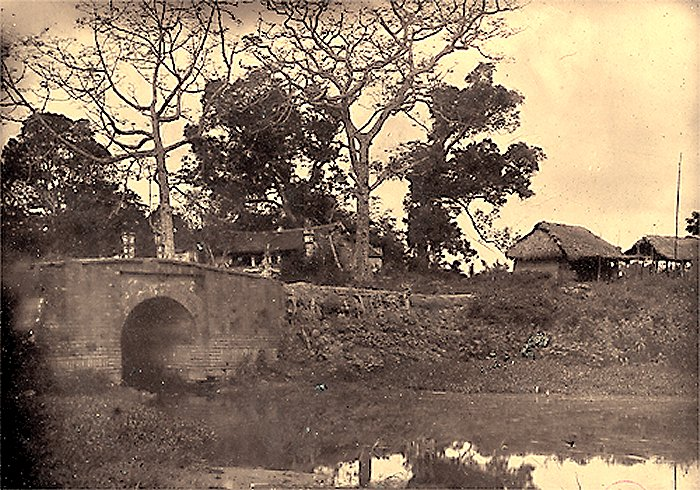
Paper Bridge (Pont de Papier)

The battle was a serious defeat for the French, but its ultimate result was to strengthen the resolve of Jules Ferry's administration to entrench the French protectorate in Tonkin. The news of Rivière's defeat and death reached Paris on 26 May, and the French navy minister Admiral Peyron declared 'France will avenge her glorious children!' The Chamber of Deputies immediately voted a credit of three and a half million francs to finance the despatch of a strong expeditionary corps to Tonkin.

In later years a reaction set in. Some critics questioned Rivière's tactics at Paper Bridge, suggesting that he had lost the battle because he had been too impetuous. In particular, he was faulted for accepting battle so readily and for exposing his guns to capture by placing them too far forward. In the 1930s Colonel Alfred Thomazi, the historian of the French conquest of Indochina, did his best to rebut such criticisms:

If Rivière had been more prudent and withdrawn his column as soon as he had crossed the bridge, when Berthe de Villers was wounded, our losses would have been smaller and the engagement would have remained indecisive. But he had marched out to disengage Hanoi and strike a heavy blow at the encircling enemy. To fall back at the first contact would have been to lose face, to encourage the boldness of the Black Flags, and to expose the town to attacks which even a modest success could prevent. And, given the results of the preceding skirmishes, such a success seemed certain. And were we not, by now, used to miracles? In Tonkin, as previously in Cochinchina, victory seemed the invariable reward for boldness. Henri Rivière, a Parisian who considered himself anything but romantic, a writer who was also a man of action, died a hero, like Francis Garnier, for believing that nothing was impossible.
