= Henri Rivière (naval officer) =

19th-century French naval officer

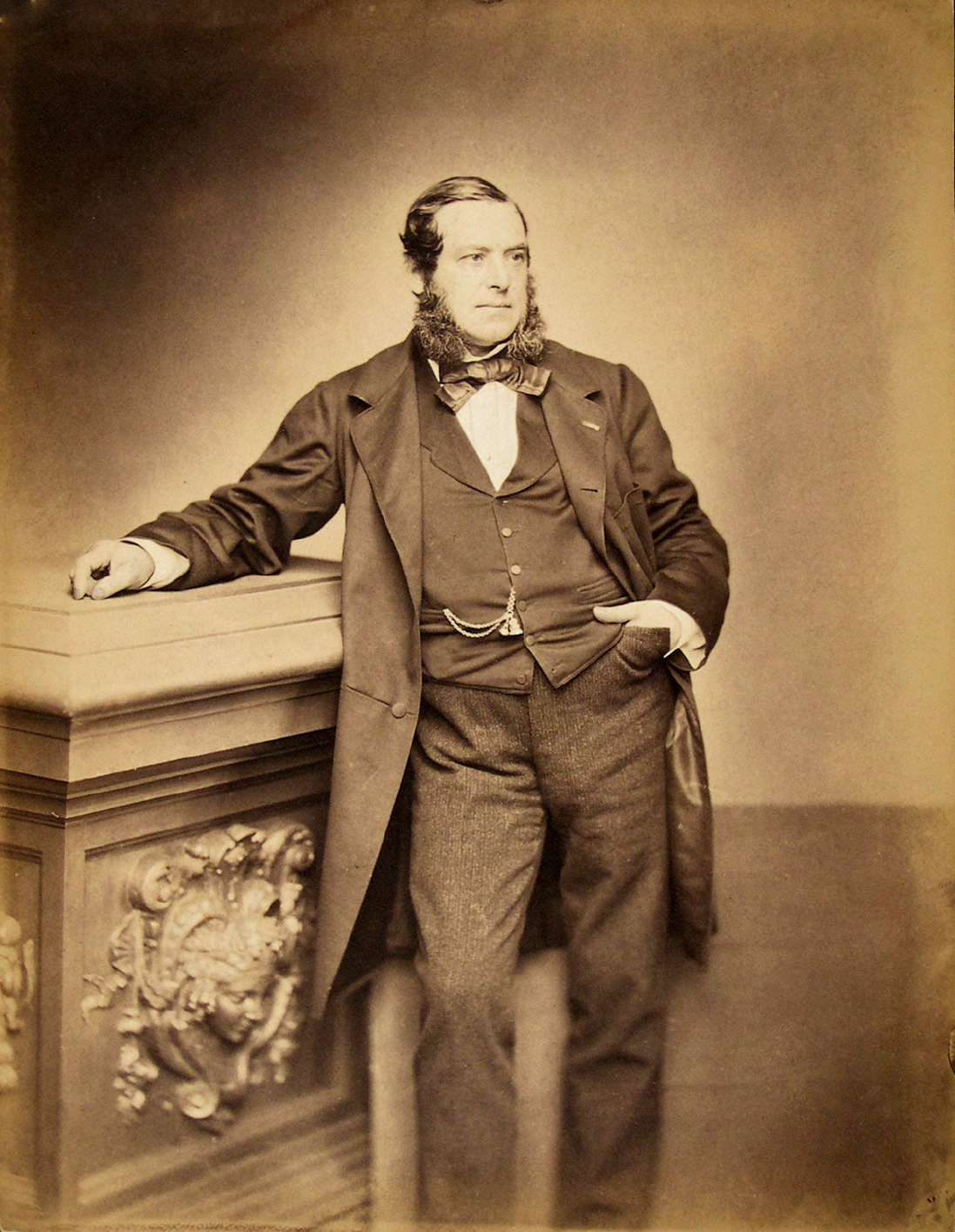
Henri Rivière by Antoine Samuel Adam-Salomon c. 1859.

Henri Laurent Rivière (1827–1883) was a French naval officer and a writer who is chiefly remembered today for advancing the French conquest of Tonkin (northern Vietnam) in the 1880s. Rivière's seizure of the citadel of Hanoi in April 1882 inaugurated a period of undeclared hostilities between France and Dai Nam (as Vietnam was known then) that culminated one year later in the Tonkin campaign (1883–1886).

== Early career ==
Born in Paris on 12 July 1827, Rivière entered the École Navale in October 1842. He passed out as a midshipman (second class) in August 1845, and saw his first naval service in the Pacific Ocean on Brillante. In February 1847 he was posted to the South Seas naval division, to Virginie. He was promoted to midshipman (first class) in September 1847 and to enseigne de vaisseau in September 1849. During the next five years he served in the Mediterranean squadron aboard Iéna (1850), Labrador (1851) and Jupiter (1852–54). Significantly, his confidential reports from this period mentioned that he seemed to be unduly interested in poetry and literature.

Rivière took part in the Crimean campaign (1854–56), serving on the vessels Uranie, Suffren, Bourrasque and Montebello. Promoted to the rank of lieutenant de vaisseau in November 1856, he served aboard Reine Hortense during the Franco-Austrian War (1859). In 1866 he took part in the Mexican campaign aboard Rhône and Brandon. He was promoted to the rank of capitaine de frégate in June 1870 and served as second officer on the ironclad corvette Thétis with the French Baltic Squadron during the Franco-Prussian War. He saw no active service in any of these campaigns.

Rivière's role in the suppression of a revolt in the French colony of New Caledonia in the late 1870s won him promotion to the coveted rank of capitaine de vaisseau in January 1880. In November 1881 Rivière was posted to Saigon, as commander of the Cochin China naval division. The posting was generally regarded as a backwater that offered few opportunities for distinction. Rivière himself saw it as an opportunity to write a literary masterpiece that would procure him membership of the Académie française. Although Rivière spent most of his adult life as a naval officer, he was also ambitious for literary distinction. He was a journalist for La Liberté, and also had articles published in the Revue des deux mondes.

== Rivière's intervention in Tonkin ==
At the end of 1881 Rivière was sent with a small French military force to Hanoi to investigate Vietnamese complaints against the activities of French merchants. In defiance of the instructions of his superiors, he stormed the citadel of Hanoi on 25 April 1882 in a few hours, with the governor Hoàng Diệu committing suicide having sent a note of apology to the emperor. Although Rivière subsequently returned the citadel to Vietnamese control, his recourse to force was greeted with alarm in both Vietnam and China.

The Vietnamese government, unable to confront Rivière with its own ramshackle army, enlisted the help of Liu Yongfu, whose well-trained and seasoned Black Flag soldiers were to prove a thorn in the side of the French. The Black Flags had already inflicted one humiliating defeat on a French force commanded by lieutenant de vaisseau Francis Garnier in 1873. Like Rivière in 1882, Garnier had exceeded his instructions and attempted to intervene militarily in northern Vietnam. Liu Yongfu had been called in by the Vietnamese government, and ended a remarkable series of French victories against the Vietnamese by defeating Garnier's small French force beneath the walls of Hanoi. Garnier was killed in this battle, and the French government later disavowed his expedition.

The Vietnamese also bid for Chinese support. Vietnam had long been a tributary of China, and China agreed to arm and support the Black Flags and to covertly oppose French operations in Tonkin. The Qing court also sent a strong signal to the French that China would not allow Tonkin to fall under French control. In the summer of 1882 troops of the Chinese Yunnan and Guangxi armies crossed the border into Tonkin, occupying Lang Son, Bac Ninh, Hung Hoa and other towns. The French minister to China, Frédéric Bourée, was so alarmed by the prospect of war with China that in November and December 1882 he negotiated a deal with the Chinese statesman Li Hongzhang to divide Tonkin into French and Chinese spheres of influence. The Vietnamese were not consulted by either party to these negotiations.

Rivière was disgusted at the deal cut by Bourée, and in early 1883 decided to force the issue. He had recently been sent a battalion of marine infantry from France, giving him just enough men to venture beyond Hanoi. On 27 March 1883, to secure his line of communications from Hanoi to the coast, Rivière captured the citadel of Nam Dinh with a force of 520 French soldiers under his personal command. During his absence at Nam Dinh the Black Flags and Vietnamese made an attack on Hanoi, but they were repulsed by chef de bataillon Berthe de Villers in the Battle of Gia Cuc on 28 March. Rivière was jubilant: 'This will force them to take forward their Tonkin Question!'

Rivière's timing was perfect. He had expected to be cashiered for his Capture of Nam Dinh, but instead he found himself the hero of the hour. There had recently been a change of government in France, and the new administration of Jules Ferry was strongly in favour of colonial expansion. It therefore decided to back Rivière up. Ferry and his foreign minister Paul-Armand Challemel-Lacour denounced Bourée's agreement with Li Hongzhang and recalled the hapless French minister. They also made it clear to the Chinese that they were determined to place Tonkin under French protection. In April 1883, realising that the Vietnamese were incapable of resisting the French effectively, the Chinese civil mandarin Tang Jingsong (Tang Jingsong, 唐景崧) persuaded Liu Yongfu to take the field against Rivière with the Black Flag Army.

== Defeat and death ==
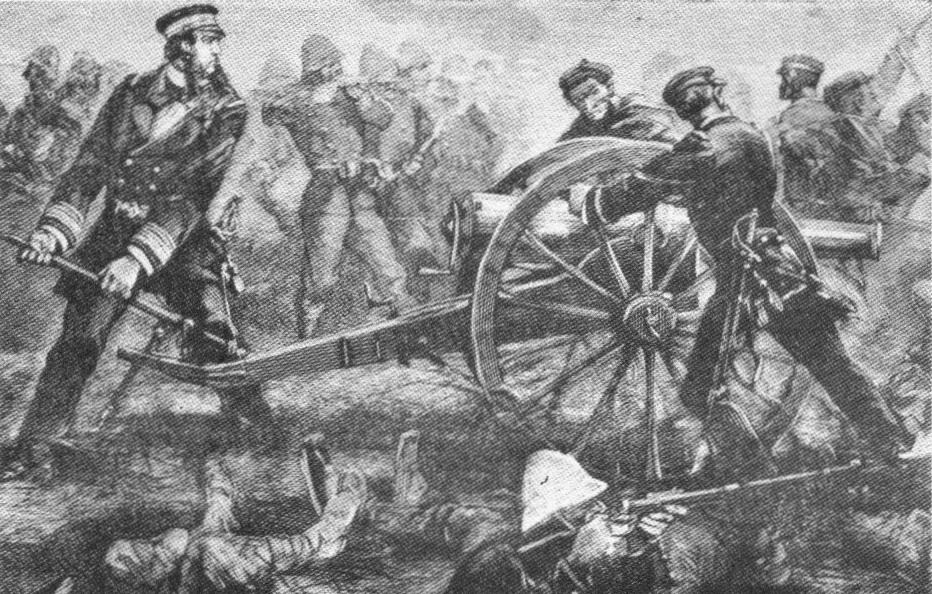
Rivière attempts to rescue a bogged French cannon at Paper Bridge

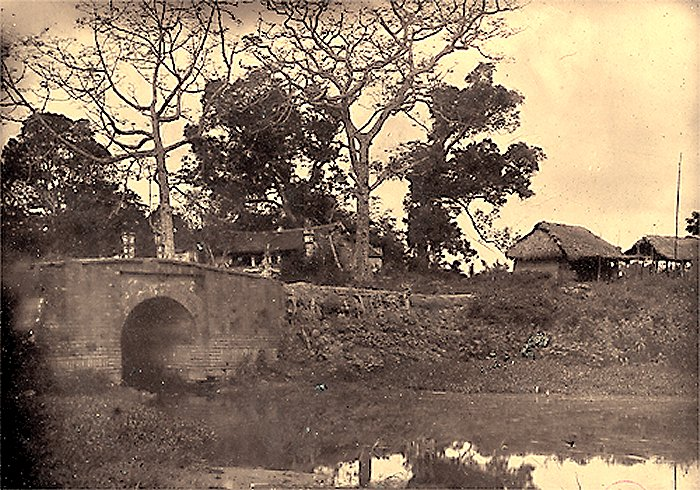
Paper Bridge (Pont de Papier)

On 10 May 1883 Liu Yongfu challenged the French to battle in a taunting message on placards that were widely distributed on the walls of Hanoi. On 19 May Rivière marched out of Hanoi to attack the Black Flags. His small force (around 450 men) advanced without proper precautions, and blundered into a well-prepared Black Flag ambush at Paper Bridge (Pont de Papier), a few miles to the west of Hanoi. In the Battle of Paper Bridge the French were enveloped on both wings, and were only with difficulty able to regroup and fall back to Hanoi. Towards the end of the battle a French cannon overturned with the shock of its recoil, and Rivière and his officers rushed forward to help the gunners to right it. The Black Flags fired a volley into this struggling mass of men, killing one French officer and seriously wounding Rivière in the shoulder. Several seconds later, Rivière collapsed. Seeing the French line in confusion, the Black Flags surged forward and drove back the French rearguard. Several French officers were wounded at this critical moment, and in the confusion of the retreat Rivière's body was abandoned on the battlefield. He was immediately presumed dead by his fellow officers. If he had not already died from the effects of his wound, he would have been killed as soon as the Black Flags discovered who he was.

Although the Battle of Paper Bridge was a serious defeat for the French, it strengthened the resolve of Jules Ferry's administration to entrench the French protectorate in Tonkin. The news of Rivière's defeat and death reached Paris on 26 May, and the French navy minister Admiral Peyron declared 'France will avenge her glorious children!' The Chamber of Deputies immediately voted a credit of three and a half million francs to finance the despatch of a strong expeditionary corps to Tonkin. Rivière's adventure in Tonkin set in train a course of events that, within a few years, saw French rule extended beyond Cochinchina to the whole of Indochina.

== Posthumous honours ==
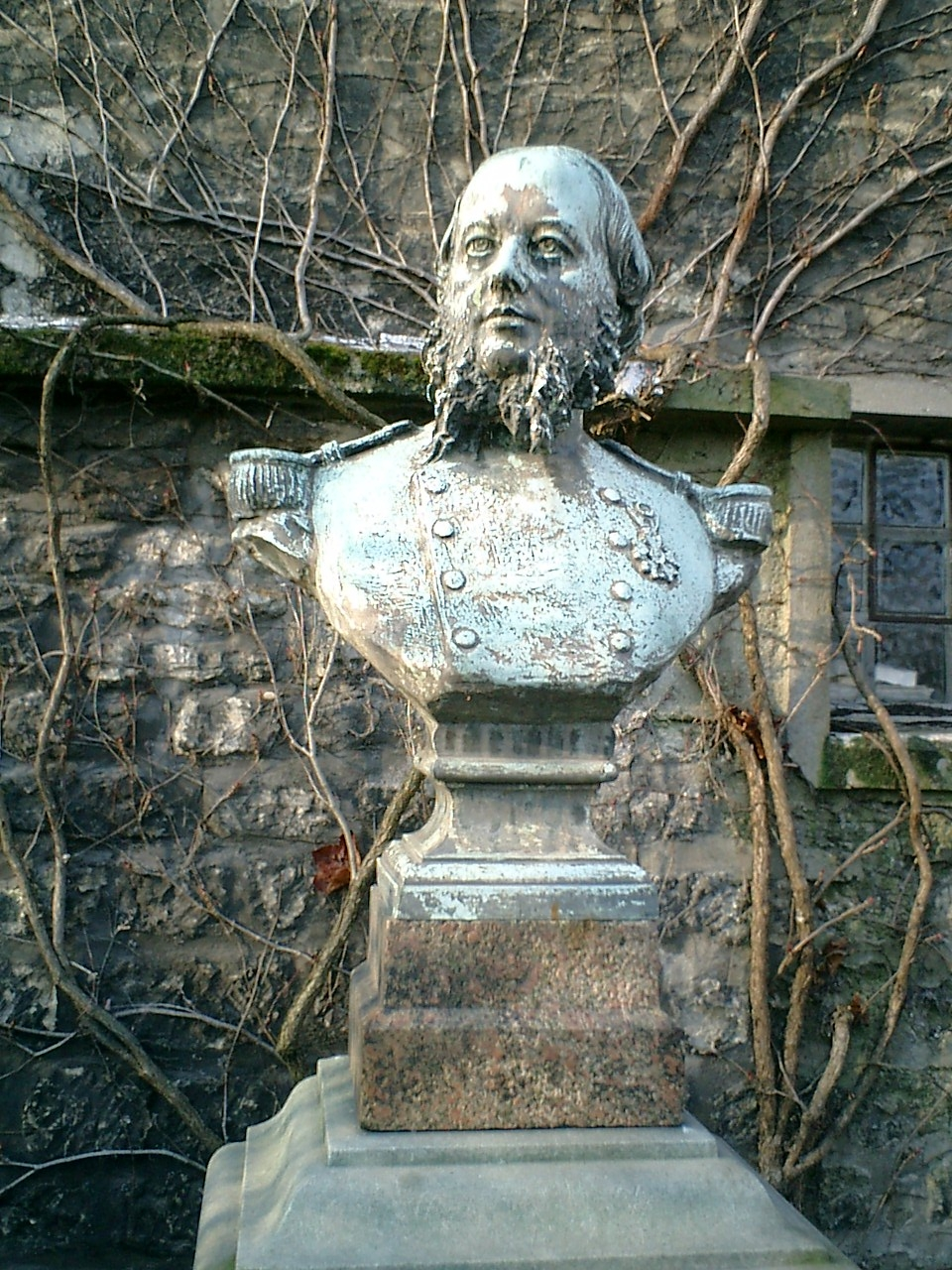
Bust of Henri Rivière, Cimetière de Montmartre

The French had been forced to leave Rivière's body on the battlefield of Paper Bridge, and for several months were unsure of the precise circumstances of his death. After being shot in the shoulder Rivière had fallen, then risen to his feet, then collapsed again. His recumbent body had been last seen surrounded by a knot of Black Flag soldiers. Most of Rivière's fellow officers naturally assumed that he had been either shot or stabbed to death on the battlefield there and then, but many Vietnamese believed that he had been taken alive by the Black Flags. According to a Vietnamese soldier who claimed to have been present at the time, Rivière had been brought into Liu Yongfu's presence shortly after the battle ended and had been beheaded on the orders of the Black Flag leader, one of whose close friends had been killed by the French during the battle. Neither version of his death could be confirmed.

Several weeks after the battle the French heard rumours that Rivière's body had been savagely mutilated and buried near the Black Flag stronghold of Phu Hoai. On 18 September 1883, acting on information received from Vietnamese informants, the French scouted the area with two battalions of marine infantry. Rivière's severed head and hands, buried in a lacquered box, were discovered in the village of Kien Mai, and three weeks later the mutilated body of a European, dressed in naval uniform, was found close to Paper Bridge, near the spot where Rivière had fallen on 19 May. The body had been gashed with sword slashes, the head and the hands were missing, and the sleeves of the naval tunic had been cut away to remove the marks of rank. Several French naval officers who knew Rivière well were able to confirm that the body was indeed his. These circumstances strongly suggested that Rivière had been killed in the heat of battle, on the battlefield of Paper Bridge. Liu Yongfu had offered a substantial bounty for the heads of French officers, graded according to their rank, and it seems likely that a Black Flag soldier had killed the wounded French commander and then decapitated him in order to claim the bounty, cutting off his hands so that his rank could be verified by the number of bands (galons) on his tunic cuffs.

Rivière's remains were brought back to Hanoi, where a funeral service was said over them by Paul-François Puginier, the French apostolic vicar of Western Tonkin. Ten years earlier Puginier had performed a similar office over the body of Francis Garnier, who had died in remarkably similar circumstances. The remains were subsequently returned to France at the request of Rivière's family. They were finally buried in the Cimetière de Montmartre, in Paris.
