= Hoàng Diệu =

Vietnamese politician

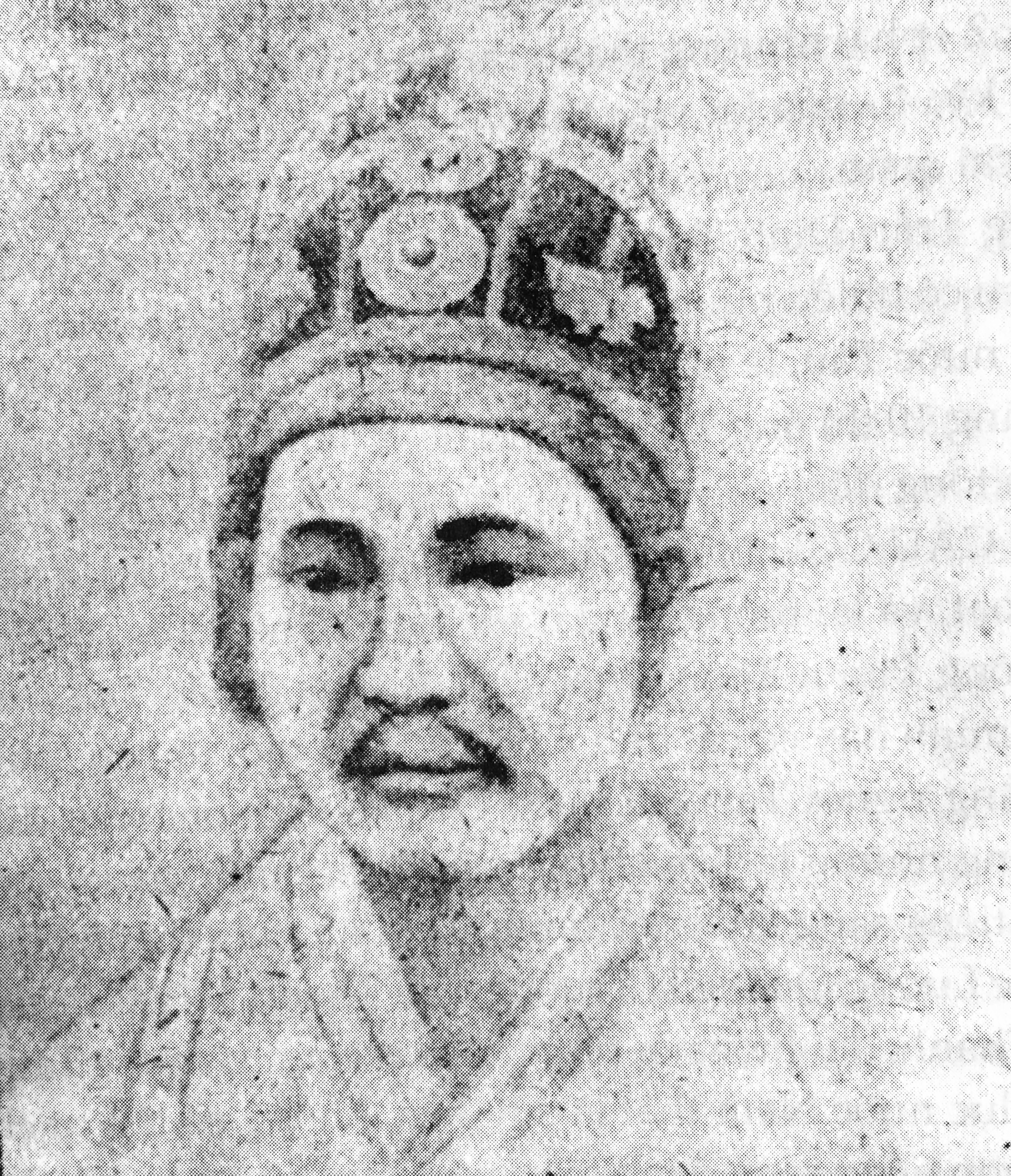
- Governor-general of Hà Ninh
- Born: 14 March 1829; Quảng Nam
- Died: 25 April 1882 (aged 53); Hà Nội
- Other name: Tĩnh Trai
- Children: Hoàng Thị Lệ, Hoàng Tuấn, Hoàng Hiệp
- Parents: Hoàng Văn Cự (father); Phạm Thị Khuê (mother)

Hoàng Diệu (chữ Hán: 黃耀, 14 March 1829 – 25 April 1882), born Hoàng Kim Tích (黃金錫), courtesy name Quang Viễn, was a Nguyễn dynasty Governor-general of Hà - Ninh, who committed suicide after failure in protecting Hà Nội citadel.

== Early years ==
Hoàng Diệu was born in 1829 in a Confucian family in Xuân Đài village, Diên Phước district, Quảng Nam province (now is Điện Bàn, Quảng Nam). In 1848, he got Cử nhân (舉人 senior bachelor) degree in the Regional Exam (Vietnamese: Thi Hương). In 1853, he got Phó bảng (sub table, under doctorate table) title in the National Exam (Vietnamese: Thi Hội). In 1855, he was appointed to Chief of Bồng Sơn district, then Tuy Viễn district in Bình Định province.

In 1864, there was a coup attempt by Hồng Tập, a younger cousin of King Tự Đức (also known as Hồng Nhậm). The attempt was early exposed, and its top leaders, Hồng Tập and Nguyễn Văn Viện were sentenced to the guillotine. Hoàng Diệu came to take the chief position of Hương Trà district instead of Tôn Thất Thanh, who was sentenced to jail for aiding the coup.

He was then posted to Tri phủ (Prefect) of Đa Phúc fu (now is Bắc Giang Province), Án sát (Surveillance Commissioner) of Nam Định Province, and Bố chánh (Administration Commissioner) of Bắc Ninh Province.

In 1878, there was a huge flood in Quảng Nam, many districts fell into disease, starvation, robberies. Knowing Hoàng Diệu was an upright man, knowledgeable about the people and customs of Quảng land, King Tự Đức appointed him as Imperial Commissioner to take care of the health and safety of the people and eliminate thieves. After completing the responsibilities in Quảng Nam in early 1879, Hoàng Diệu returned to the imperial court to take up the position of the Deputy Minister of Justice, then Deputy Minister of Administration cum Chief of Censorate.

In 1880, Hoàng Diệu was appointed as the governor-general of Hà Ninh (now are Hà Nội, Hà Nam, and Ninh Bình). He suggested separation of Lý Nhân fu of Hà Nội province to form a new province under the reign of King Tự Đức. That suggestion was realized in 1890 by the French Indochina authority with the formation of Hà Nam province.

== Battle of Hanoi (1882) ==
Hoàng Diệu committed suicide by hanging when the French under captain Henri Rivière, having exceeded his superiors' orders, suddenly took the citadel of Hanoi on 25 April 1882.

== Legacy and memory ==
Hoàng Diệu is venerated alongside Nguyễn Tri Phương by the Vietnamese people as loyal subjects who sacrificed themselves for Vietnam. Many cities and streets in Vietnam are named after him.

His grandson was the essayist Phan Khôi.
