= Capture of Nam Định (1883) =

- Part of the Tonkin campaign
Date	27 March 1883
Location	Nam Định, Northern Vietnam
Result	French victory

Belligerents
France	Nguyen dynasty Black Flag Army; Qing dynasty

Commanders and leaders
(French Third Republic) Henri Rivière	Vũ Trọng Bình; Lê Văn Điếm; Hồ Bá Ôn; Vĩnh Thông Chất

Strength
6 gunboats 500 marine infantry 20 Cochinchinese riflemen 60 sailors	6,200 Vietnamese soldiers 600 Chinese soldiers under Black Flag command

Casualties and losses
1 gunboat lightly damaged 4 men wounded (1 died of wounds on May 13th)	Heavy 98 guns captured

The Capture of Nam Định (27 March 1883), a confrontation between the French and the Vietnamese, was one of the early engagements of the Tonkin Campaign (1883–86). In a brief campaign in the last week of March 1883, Commandant Henri Rivière captured the citadel of Nam Định, the second-largest city in Tonkin, with a flotilla of gunboats and a battalion of marine infantry.

Rivière's seizure of Nam Định marked a significant escalation of French ambitions in Tonkin, and had important consequences. China began to covertly support the Vietnamese government in its opposition to French colonization. Chinese involvement in Tonkin ultimately resulted in the nine-month Sino-French War (August 1884–April 1885).

== Background ==
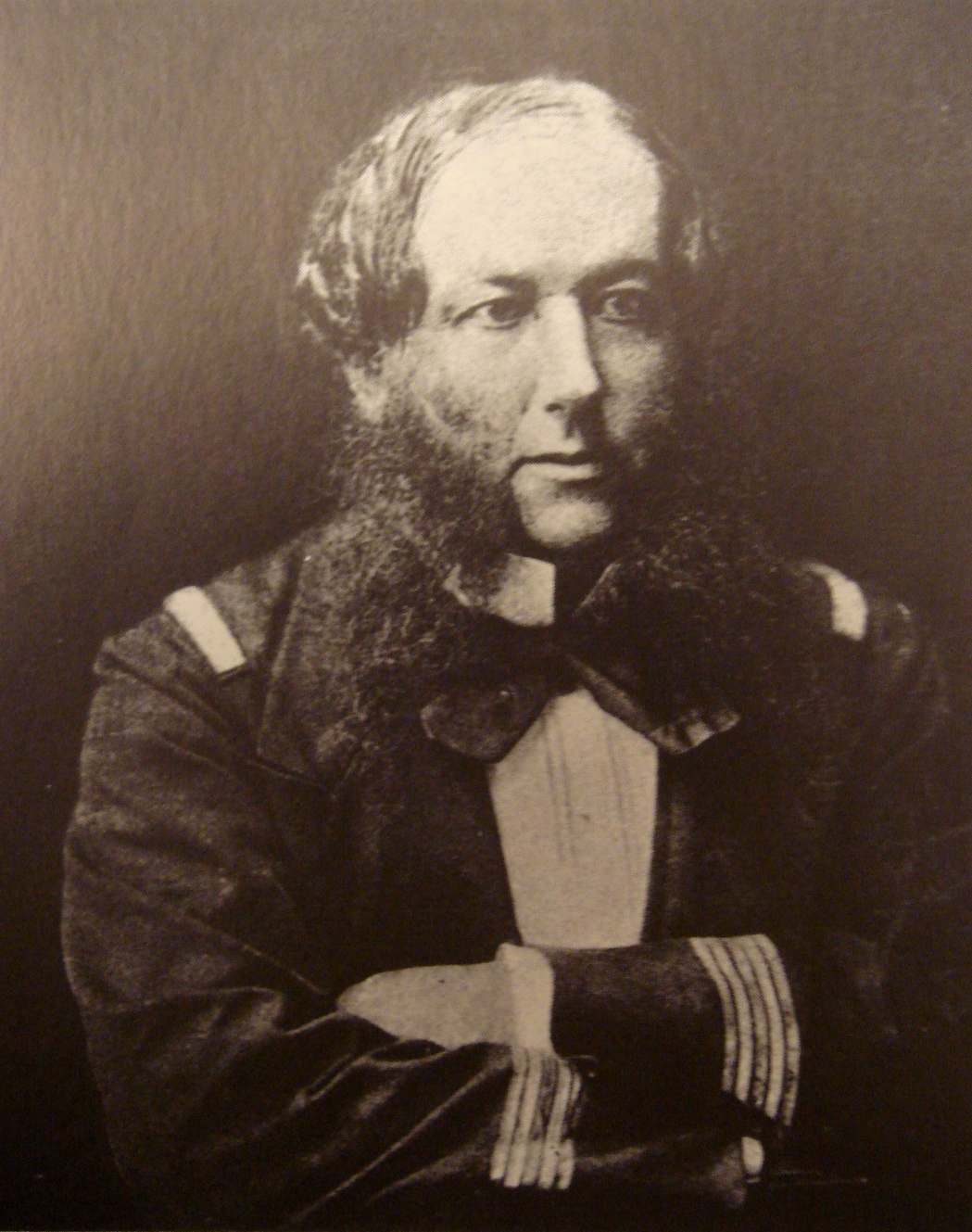
Henri Rivière (1827–83)

French intervention in northern Vietnam was precipitated by Commandant Henri Rivière, who was sent with a small French military force to Hanoi at the end of 1881 to investigate Vietnamese complaints against the activities of French merchants. In defiance of the instructions of his superiors, Rivière stormed the citadel of Hanoi on 25 April 1882. Although Rivière subsequently returned the citadel to Vietnamese control, his recourse to force was greeted with alarm in both Vietnam and China.

The Vietnamese government, unable to confront Rivière with its own ramshackle army, enlisted the help of Liu Yongfu, whose well-trained and seasoned Black Flag soldiers were to prove a thorn in the side of the French. The Vietnamese also bid for Chinese support. Vietnam had long been a tributary state of China, and China agreed to arm and support the Black Flags and to covertly oppose French operations in Tonkin. The Qing court also sent a strong signal to the French that China would not allow Tonkin to fall under French control. In the summer of 1882 troops of the Chinese Yunnan and Guangxi Armies crossed the border into Tonkin, occupying Lạng Sơn, Bắc Ninh, Hưng Hóa and other towns. The French minister to China, Frédéric Bourée, was so alarmed by the prospect of war with China that in November and December 1882, he negotiated a deal with the Chinese statesman Li Hongzhang to divide Tonkin into French and Chinese spheres of influence. Both negotiators were criticized for giving too much away, and the deal soon unravelled. It was never ratified in China, and in France Jules Ferry's incoming administration disavowed the agreement in March 1883 and recalled Bourée.

== Occupation of Hòn Gai ==
In late February 1883, the French forces in Hanoi were reinforced by a 500-man battalion of marine infantry from France under the command of Lieutenant-Colonel Carreau, which more than doubled the force at Rivière's disposal, was a parting gift from the bellicose Admiral Bernard Jauréguiberry, who had been replaced as navy minister on 29 January. Carreau's men sailed from France aboard the transport Corrèze and reached Hanoi on 24 February. The instructions that accompanied the reinforcements specified that they were not to be used to extend the French occupation of Tonkin.

On 8 March, Rivière learned that the Annamese government was planning to lease the coal mines at Hòn Gai, a coastal town near Haiphong, to a Chinese consortium which was really a front for a British company. If the British were allowed to install themselves at Hòn Gai, France could bid farewell to its dreams of colonial expansion in Tonkin. In defiance of both the letter and the spirit of his instructions, Rivière immediately decided to take the initiative. On his orders, Commandant Berthe de Villers left the following day aboard Parseval, raised the French tricolour in Hòn Gai and established a post of 50 men there. The French met no resistance.

In his report on this action to Charles Thomson, the governor of Cochinchina, Rivière explained that he had occupied Hòn Gai primarily to secure his line of communications with Haiphong. But he did not hide the fact that he was also attempting to extend French control of Tonkin. With his friends, he was even franker.

"I have taken possession of the entire mining district," he wrote. "We have always coveted it, but have always hesitated to act. This will force them to take forward their Tonkin Question!"

== The decision to attack Nam Định ==
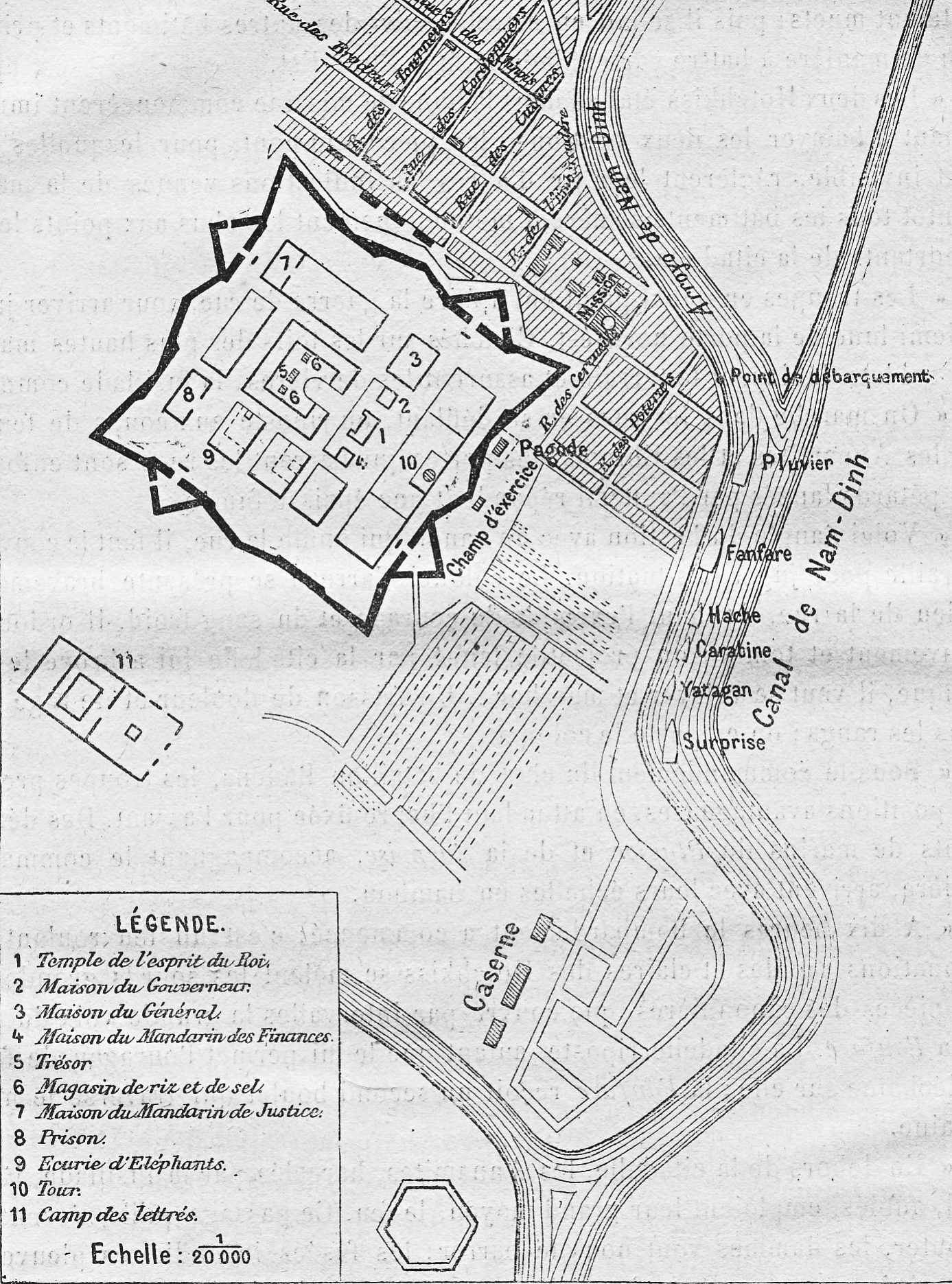
The citadel of Nam Định, March 1883

Rivière also believed that, in his present situation, doing nothing was more dangerous than taking the initiative. Alarming news was coming in from both the north and the south. At Sơn Tây, Liu Yongfu was preparing to attack the French in Hanoi with 5,000 men of the Black Flag Army. In the Delta, the governor of Nam Định had armed the citadel, and the French gunboats were having great difficulty in preventing him from blocking the canals. Rivière was convinced that France should strike first. Now, at last, he had the means to act.

"As this indecisive government has been imprudent enough to send me 500 men," he wrote to a friend, "I have decided to use them to do what it did not decide I should do."

Rivière decided to strike at Nam Định, again in order to secure his communications with the coast. It was the strategy that Francis Garnier had adopted in 1873, and it was probably the right one. But the decision aroused considerable opposition among his officers. They argued that it would result in a most undesirable division of the small French force at Hanoi. Nam Định would have to be garrisoned if it fell, and the French would then be too stretched to carry out further military operations. They recommended that the French should instead attack Liu Yongfu in Sơn Tây with all their available forces. Rivière was not convinced. He believed, probably rightly, that the French were not strong enough to take on Liu Yongfu. He overruled his officers and ordered plans to be prepared for an expedition against Nam Định. Eleven months after French troops had gone into action at Hanoi, Rivière once again threw down the gauntlet to the Vietnamese and Chinese courts.

Nam Định was defended by 6,200 Vietnamese soldiers under the command of the Tổng đốc (governor) Vũ Trọng Bình, assisted by the Đề đốc Lê Văn Điếm and the Án sát sứ Hồ Bá Ôn. A contingent of 600 Chinese soldiers from the Chinese garrison of Bắc Ninh also fought covertly on the Vietnamese side, led by the Black Flag officer Vĩnh Thông Chất. As France and China were not at war, the Chinese troops wore Black Flag uniforms to disguise their participation in the battle.

== The Nam Dinh campaign ==
The citadel of Ninh Bình

Chef de bataillon Pierre de Badens (1847–97) made a reconnaissance of Nam Định on 11 March by boat, and reported that it had been put into a good state of defence and was garrisoned by an army of 8,000 to 10,000 men. Rivière nevertheless decided to attack the city, and assembled a flotilla of junks and steam-launches to transport four and a half marine infantry companies under Colonel Carreau's command and a detachment of Cochinchinese riflemen (tirailleurs annamites)—520 men in all—down the Red River to Nam Định. This was a breathtakingly small attacking force, but it would be supported by several gunboats, whose firepower would enormously increase the chances of success. Rivière took personal command of the expedition, and his flotilla left Hanoi on 23 March, accompanied by the gunboats Hache and Yatagan. Berthe de Villers was left to defend Hanoi with three and a half companies of infantry and the gunboat Léopard. (Note: Carreau's marine infantry force consisted of the 27th and 31st Companies, 4th Marine Infantry Regiment (Captains Lancelot and Guilloteau) and the 21st and 22nd Companies and a platoon of the 23rd Company, 3rd Marine Infantry Regiment (Captains Buquet, Jeannin and Penther). The Cochinchinese riflemen were under the command of 2nd Lieutenant Daim.)

The expedition had first to run the gauntlet of the defences of Ninh Bình, whose citadel was built on a massive crag overlooking the Red River and was defended by a number of cannon which completely commanded the passage. The flotilla reached Ninh Bình on the afternoon of 24 March, to find the gunboat Carabine waiting. This was a critical moment. The garrison of the citadel stood to arms at the French approach, and according to Rivière 'their guns, if well handled, could have annihilated us'. However, the governor of Ninh Bình declined to open fire, being 'one of those Asiatics who do not normally concern themselves with the misfortunes of their colleagues unless they affect them personally'. The expedition passed Ninh Bình unharmed, and anchored that evening at the entrance to the Nam Định canal, where it was joined by the gunboats Pluvier and Surprise.

On the morning of 25 March, the flotilla anchored off the southern wall of the citadel of Nam Định, where the gunboat Fanfare was already in position. Rivière now had five gunboats at his disposal. In the early afternoon French marine infantry went ashore and occupied the Nam Định naval barracks, evacuated by the city's defenders, without resistance. Later in the afternoon sailors from Fanfare went ashore and burned a number of wooden huts to obtain a clear field of fire for the gunboat's artillery. Several Vietnamese cannon responded to this provocation by opening fire, with little effect, on the French gunboat. Fanfare replied, and dismounted four artillery pieces on the city's ramparts. The action died down by nightfall, and did not become general. While this exchange of fire was in progress Rivière summoned the city's governor Vũ Trọng Bình to present himself in person aboard Pluvier and to hand over the citadel before 8 a.m. on the following day. The governor's refusal arrived in the evening.

== The bombardment of Nam Dinh ==
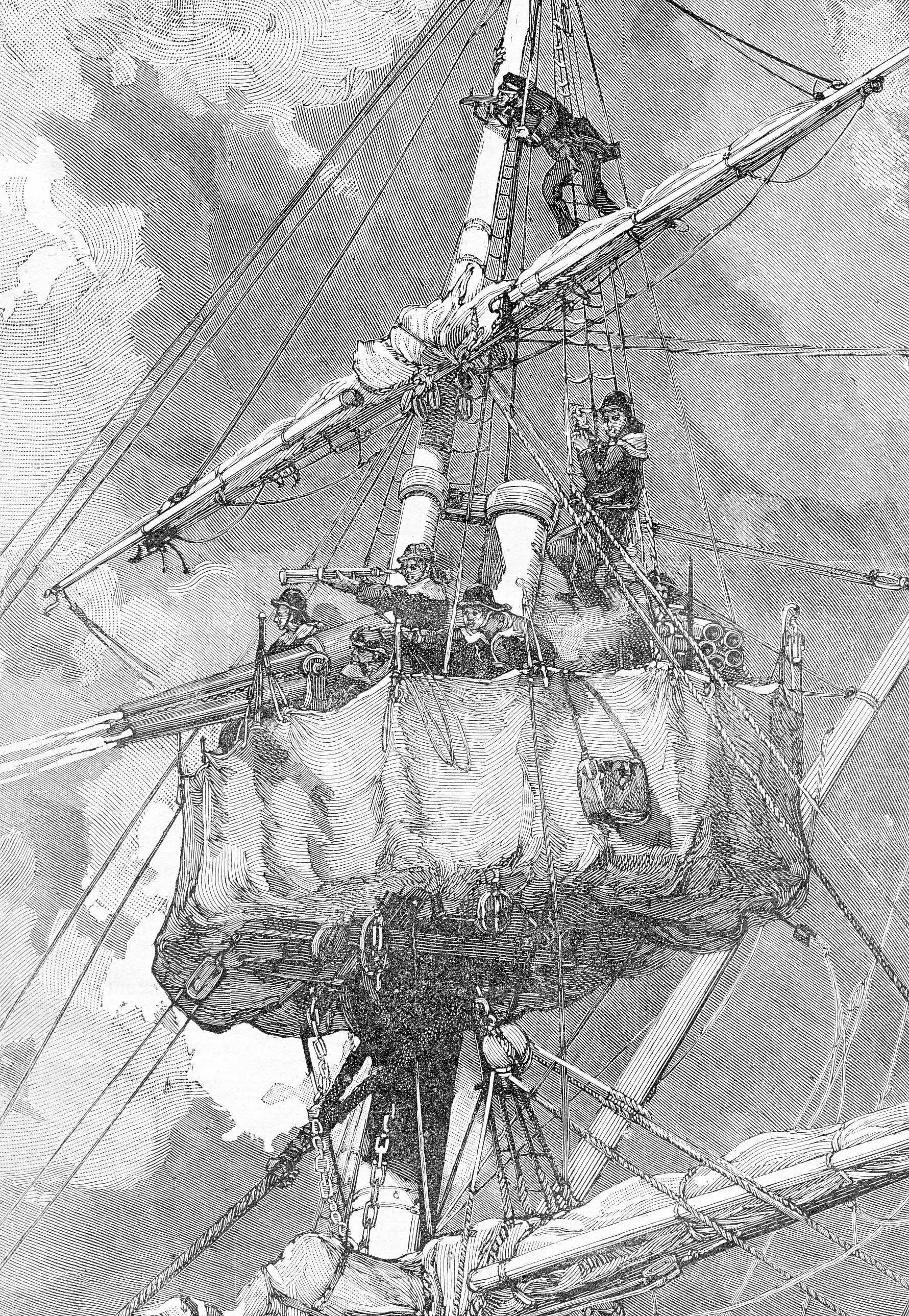
Pluvier engages the Vietnamese defences at Nam Định with her masthead-mounted Hotchkiss canon-revolver

The walls of Nam Định were fifteen feet thick and solidly revetted. They could not be scaled by the attackers, as they were protected by deep ditches filled with water. Knowing that it would be impossible to breach the walls with the small-calibre cannon of the French gunboats, Rivière decided to force an entrance into Nam Định by destroying one of the main gates with explosives. He nevertheless ordered a preliminary bombardment of the city's ramparts by the gunboats, hoping to dismount as many Vietnamese artillery pieces as possible before his infantry and engineers made their assault. On the evening of 25, the gunboats deployed along the Nam Định canal into a long line opposite the southeast wall of the citadel, enabling them to bring the defenders under a punishing crossfire.

Rivière wanted to open fire as soon as the ultimatum expired, but it was so foggy on the morning of 26 March that action was impossible. However, the fog cleared in the early afternoon, and Fanfare moved up close to the southeast wall and began to bombard Nam Định's outer defences at 2 pm, firing slowly and accurately to dismount the guns facing the canal. To keep the defenders under cover, both Fanfare and Pluvier engaged them with their Hotchkiss canons-revolvers. After two hours, the fire from the southern defences slackened and Fanfare withdrew, having suffered only minor damage from two hits by enemy cannonballs. Many of the guns in the citadel had ignored the French gunboats, and fired instead on a nearby Roman Catholic mission.

== The capture of Nam Định ==
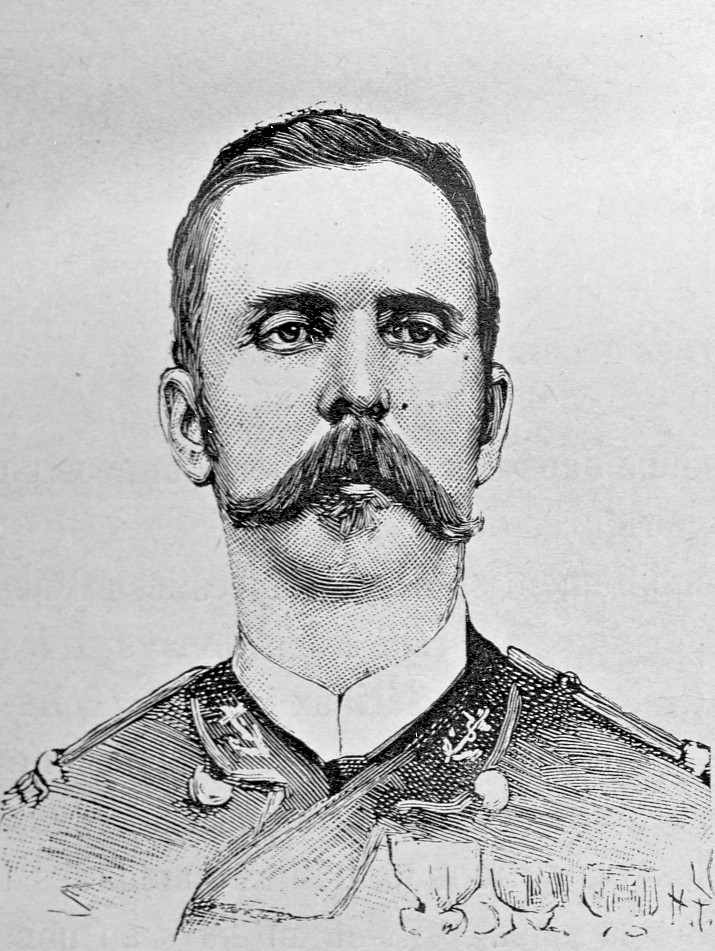
Lieutenant-Colonel Carreau, mortally wounded at the capture of Nam Định

Rivière assaulted Nam Định the following day. He disembarked his force at 11 am, after a devastating five-hour bombardment of the citadel by the gunboats. The attack force numbered just under 600 men, as Rivière supported the marine infantry and Cochinchinese riflemen with the landing companies of the gunboats Pluvier and Fanfare. The troops went ashore in a suburb beyond the city's outer walls and were able to advance under cover of the buildings until they reached the main defences. In accordance with Rivière's plan, capitaine du génie Dupommier used dynamite charges to blow in the gate of the eastern demilune, then the eastern gate of the citadel. Dupommier and his party of engineers came under heavy fire from the Vietnamese defenders as they advanced to lay their charges, and had to fall back and wait for covering fire before making a second attempt. Once both gates had been blown in, the French charged into the citadel. Rivière led from the front, urging on his troops as they fought their way into the city and setting an example of personal courage. The Vietnamese resisted fiercely, but were overwhelmed by the superior firepower and morale of the French. By late afternoon the city was in French hands and its governor in flight. Sailors from Fanfare and Pluvier reached the summit of the citadel together. Unable to agree on who was first to the top, they hauled down the Annamese flag and hoisted two French flags in its place.

A large Vietnamese force outside the city attempted to attack the French gunboats in the early evening, but was shelled in the open and quickly dispersed.

French casualties in this operation were remarkably light: only four men wounded. However, one of the casualties was Lieutenant-Colonel Carreau, the commander of the expeditionary battalion, whose foot was smashed by a cannonball. His leg was later amputated, but his condition worsened and he died on 13 May. Vietnamese casualties are not known, but according to Rivière the defenders fought with unusual stubbornness, and when the French entered the city they found its walls piled with corpses.

== Aftermath ==
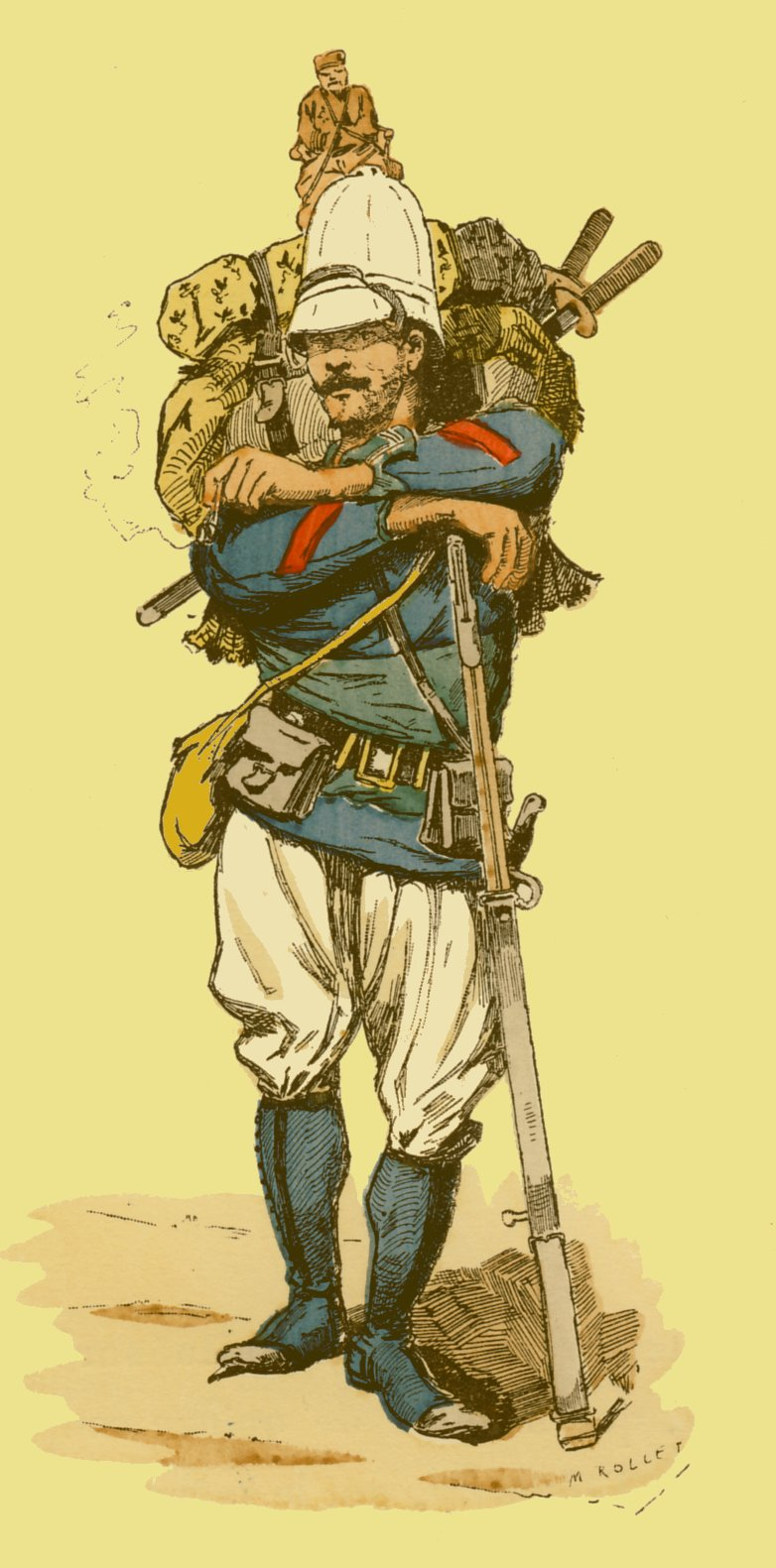
French marine infantryman

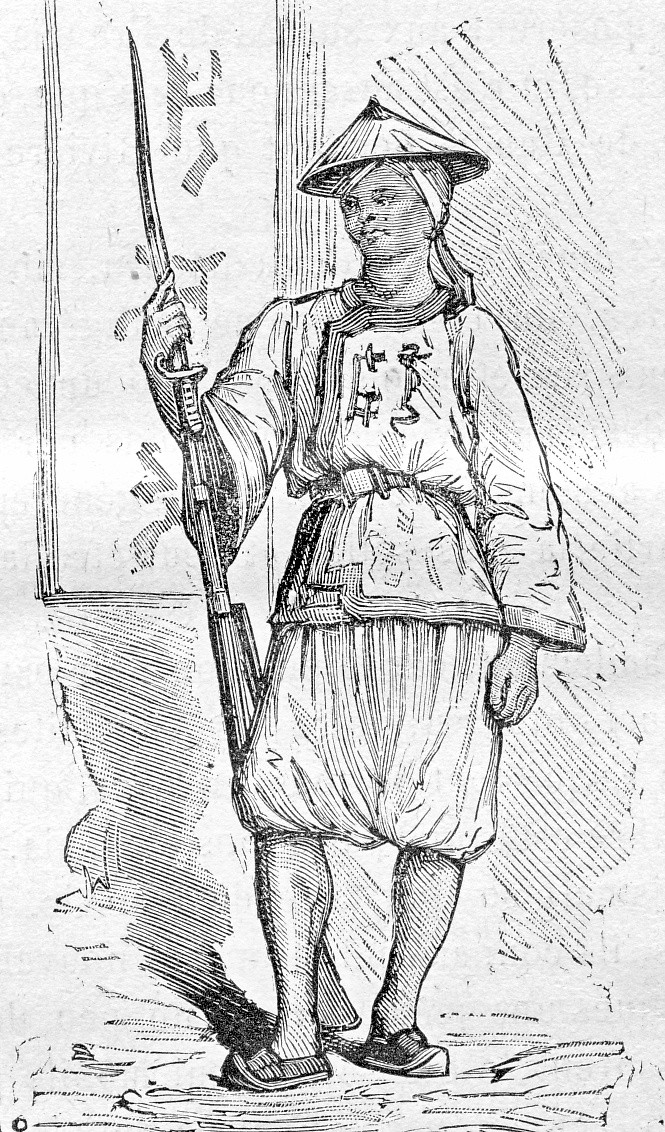
Vietnamese infantryman

The French found 98 cannon in the citadel of Nam Định, including five 30-millimetre rifled French guns ceded under the 1874 treaty. As the citadel was smaller than Hanoi's and remained defensible despite the bombardment it had just suffered, Rivière decided to occupy it. He appointed chef de bataillon Badens commandant supérieur of Nam Định, giving him a garrison of 440 men and two gunboats. Badens quickly restored order in the town and reconstituted its municipal government, appointing new magistrates on the advice of the head of the local Catholic mission. By 31 March, when Rivière returned to Hanoi, the shops had reopened and many of the inhabitants had returned.

Rivière praised the conduct of the marine infantry who had made the assault, some of whom had also taken part in the capture of Hanoi citadel on 25 April 1882, in the following order of the day:

Vous venez de montrer, à la prise de la citadelle de Nam-Dinh, le même entrain, la même valeur, le même dévouement qu’à la prise de la citadelle d’Hanoï. Je vous confonds les uns et les autres, les anciens comme les nouveaux, dans cet éloge, que notre brave colonel blessé à votre tête vous décerne comme moi. La Patrie, qui vous suit de cœur dans les pays lointains où nous sommes, tressaillera bientôt d’émotion et d’orgueil en apprenant ce que vous avez fait. Vive la France!

(You have just shown, at the capture of the citadel of Nam Định, the same enthusiasm, the same valour and the same devotion as at the capture of the citadel of Hanoi. I congratulate you all, making no distinction between those there then and those here now, between old hands and newcomers; and our brave colonel who was wounded at your head sees you as I do. Our country, whose heart has followed you into these far-off regions, will soon thrill with emotion and pride when it learns what you have done. Long live France!)
