= Retreat from Lạng Sơn =

1885 Qing victory in the Sino-French War

- Part of the Sino-French War
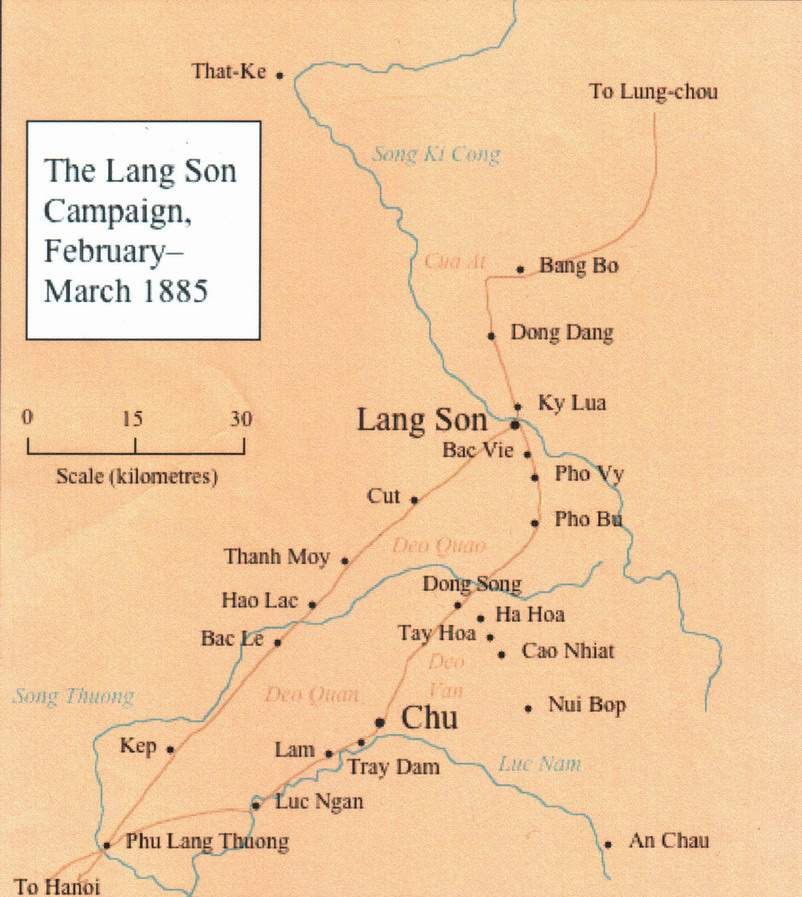
- Bang Bo, Ky Lua and the Retreat from Lạng Sơn, March 1885
Date	28 March - 5 April 1885
Location	Lạng Sơn, northern Vietnam
Result	Qing Chinese victory

Belligerents
France: French Cochinchina	Qing dynasty

Commanders and leaders
(French Third Republic) Paul-Gustave Herbinger (French Third Republic) Louis Brière de l'Isle	(Qing dynasty) Feng Zicai (Qing dynasty) Pan Dingxin (Qing dynasty) Wang Debang (Qing dynasty) Su Yuanchun

Strength
1200~1500	Regional forces 10000

Casualties and losses
7 killed and 38 injured	unknown

The Retreat from Lạng Sơn (French: retraite de Lang-Son) was a controversial French strategic withdrawal in Tonkin at the end of March 1885 during the Sino-French War (August 1884 to April 1885). It represented the last major event of the conflict and was deemed a considerable embarrassment in France, further cementing negative public opinion about the colonial conflict which led to the collapse of French Prime Minister Jules Ferry's government.

== Background ==
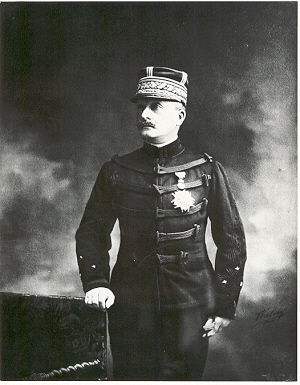
General François Oscar de Négrier (1842–1913)

By the middle of March 1885 the military situation in Tonkin had reached a temporary stalemate. In February 1885, in the Lạng Sơn Campaign, the French had captured Lạng Sơn and driven China's Guangxi Army out of Tonkin. In the second half of February General Louis Brière de l'Isle, the general-in-chief of the Tonkin Expeditionary Corps, returned to Hanoi with Lieutenant-Colonel Laurent Giovaninelli's 1st Brigade to relieve the Siege of Tuyên Quang, leaving General François de Négrier at Lạng Sơn with the 2nd Brigade.

Giovanninelli's 1st Brigade faced Tang Jingsong's Yunnan Army around Hưng Hóa and Tuyên Quang, while de Négrier's 2nd Brigade at Lạng Sơn faced Pan Dingxin's Guangxi Army. Neither Chinese army had any realistic prospect of launching an offensive for several weeks, while the two French brigades that had jointly captured Lạng Sơn in February were not strong enough to inflict a decisive defeat on either Chinese army separately. Meanwhile, the French government was pressuring Brière de l'Isle to send the 2nd Brigade across the border into Guangxi province, in the hope that a threat to Chinese territory would force China to sue for peace. Brière de l'Isle and de Négrier examined the possibility of a campaign to capture the major Chinese military depot at Longzhou, 60 kilometres (37 mi) beyond the border, but on 17 March Brière de l'Isle advised the army ministry in Paris that such an operation was beyond his strength. Substantial French reinforcements reached Tonkin in the middle of March, giving Brière de l'Isle a brief opportunity to break the stalemate. He moved the bulk of the reinforcements to Hưng Hóa to reinforce the 1st Brigade, intending to attack the Yunnan Army and drive it back beyond Yen Bay. While he and Giovanninelli drew up plans for a western offensive, he ordered de Négrier to hold his positions at Lạng Sơn.

On 23 and 24 March the 2nd Brigade, 1,500 men strong, battled Guangxi Army troops entrenched near Zhennanguan on the Chinese border. The Battle of Bang Bo (named by the French from the Vietnamese pronunciation of Hengpo, a village in the centre of the Chinese position where the fighting was fiercest), is normally known as the Battle of Zhennan Pass in China. The French took a number of outworks on 23 March, but failed to take the main Chinese positions on 24 March and were fiercely counterattacked in their turn. Although the French made a fighting withdrawal and prevented the Chinese from piercing their line, casualties in the 2nd Brigade were relatively heavy (70 dead and 188 wounded) and there were ominous scenes of disorder as the defeated French regrouped after the battle. As the brigade's morale was precarious and ammunition was running short, de Négrier decided to fall back to Lạng Sơn.

== The battle of Ky Lua, 28 March 1885 ==
Following their victory at the Battle of Bang Bo (24 March 1885), the Chinese advanced slowly in pursuit of the retreating French, and on 28 March de Négrier fought a battle at Ky Lua in defence of Lạng Sơn. Shortly before noon the Chinese launched a frontal attack on the French positions, advancing in dense, ponderous columns. De Négrier ordered Lieutenant-Colonel Paul-Gustave Herbinger to counterattack the Chinese left wing with Diguet and Farret's battalions. The attack, supported by artillery, was completely successful, and by 4:00 pm Herbinger had driven the Guangxi Army's left wing from the hills to the northeast of Ky Lua. By 5:00 pm the Guangxi Army was in full retreat, leaving only a rearguard to discourage pursuit. French casualties at Ky Lua were 7 men killed and 38 wounded. Towards the end of the battle de Négrier was seriously wounded in the chest while scouting the Chinese positions. He was forced to hand over command to Herbinger, his senior regimental commander. Herbinger was a noted military theoretician who had won a respectable battlefield reputation during the Franco-Prussian War, but was quite out of his depth as a field commander in Tonkin. Several French officers had already commented scathingly on his performance during the Lạng Sơn campaign and at Bang Bo, where he had badly bungled an attack on the Chinese positions. He was also suffering from malaria, and his physical debility may well have impaired his judgement.

== The retreat ==
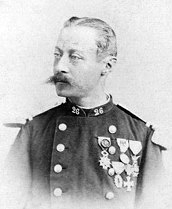
Lieutenant-Colonel Paul-Gustave Herbinger (1839–86)

Upon assuming command of the brigade, Herbinger panicked. He convinced himself that the Chinese were preparing to encircle Lạng Sơn and cut his supply line. Disregarding the appalled protests of some of his officers, he ordered the 2nd Brigade to abandon Lạng Sơn on the evening of 28 March and retreat to Chu. The retreat was initially conducted in two columns. Herbinger led the line battalions to Thanh Moy, while Schoeffer led the two Legion battalions to Dong Song. Fearing that Martin's towed artillery battery would slow down the retreat, Herbinger ordered Martin to dump his guns and limbers in the Song Ki Cong river, where they were later recovered by the Chinese. The brigade's treasure chest was also thrown into the river. Before the retreat commenced Herbinger cabled Brière de l'Isle in Hanoi, claiming that he did not have enough ammunition to fight a second battle for Lạng Sơn (a claim later shown to be untrue) and announcing his decision to retreat. He then had the telegraph cable cut, denying Brière de l'Isle the opportunity to intervene. During the night of 28 March, after winning the most complete victory of the Tonkin campaign, the bewildered soldiers of the 2nd Brigade marched out of Lạng Sơn. The retreat to Thanh Moy and Dong Song was conducted without loss and without interference from the Chinese, but both Herbinger and Schoeffer set an unnecessarily punishing pace, and both halves of the brigade were exhausted by the time they reached their destinations.

Brière de l'Isle was stunned at Herbinger's decision to abandon Lạng Sơn. His immediate reaction, on the evening of 28 March, was to despatch a pessimistic cable back to Paris which would have momentous political consequences two days later. By the following day he had recovered his usual sang froid. He spent most of the day establishing what had happened, and on the evening of 29 March sent a furious cable to Herbinger at Thanh Moy, ordering the 2nd Brigade to hold its positions at Thanh Moy and Dong Song. Herbinger was aghast at this order, believing that it played straight into the enemy's hands, but had no choice but to obey it.

On 30 March the French threw up field defences at Thanh Moy and Dong Song and prepared to meet the advancing Chinese, while Herbinger sent out cavalry patrols to determine the exact positions of the Guangxi Army. The patrols observed small Chinese scouting parties near Cut on the Mandarin Road and at Pho Bu, just to the south of Lạng Sơn, and duly reported their presence. Herbinger wildly exaggerated the significance of these reports, and warned Brière de l'Isle that, in his opinion, the brigade faced catastrophic encirclement. While waiting for Brière's response, he ordered his men to prepare for a last-ditch defence with the bayonet. As the evening wore on Herbinger became increasingly hysterical. He went to bed at 8:00 pm, convinced that he and his men would be surrounded and massacred on the following morning. At around 9:00 pm there was an outburst of firing from the sentries in the French outposts, who thought they had seen movement around their positions. It turned out to be a false alarm, and an officer woke Herbinger up to report what had happened. Herbinger's reply was illuminating: 'I'm sick, and the column is just as sick as me! Leave me alone!'

An hour later, salvation arrived. At 10:00 pm on the evening of 30 March, having receiving a stream of anguished cables from Herbinger and with no means of independently controlling the acting brigade commander's assessment of the situation, Brière de l'Isle reluctantly gave Herbinger permission to fall back to Chu 'if the situation demanded'. Herbinger clutched at this straw and issued orders for an immediate retreat by both halves of the column to Chu. 'I will take advantage of the night and the moon to retire, in conformity with your instructions,' he replied. His lassitude vanished, and he fired off a stream of orders for the retreat to his staff. 'No more hesitations, we're leaving at once!' he cried.

During the night of 30 March Herbinger's column left Thanh Moy and marched across Deo Quao to Dong Song, to link up with Schoeffer's men. A half-hearted attack on Schoeffer's positions was made just after midnight by a small force of Chinese skirmishers, and was easily repelled. Shortly before dawn the reunited 2nd Brigade marched out of Dong Song and headed south for Chu. Determined to jettison anything that might slow down the next stage of the retreat, Herbinger decided to sacrifice another artillery battery, and gave orders for the guns of Roussel's battery to be spiked and abandoned. On this occasion he was disobeyed by his officers, and Roussel's battery arrived safely at Chu without slowing down the column. Shortly after dawn on 31 March Chinese skirmishers caught up with the French column near the small village of Pho Cam. Herbinger had by now been reinforced by Brière de l'Isle with a squadron of Spahi cavalry, and the French infantry waited eagerly for him to order the Spahis to charge and scatter the Chinese skirmishers. Instead, Herbinger ordered the retreat to continue, by echelons of infantry battalions. It was the most shameful moment of the entire retreat. 'We retired in echelons like this for ten kilometres,' Captain Lecomte later wrote, '3,000 Frenchmen running away from 40 Chinese!'

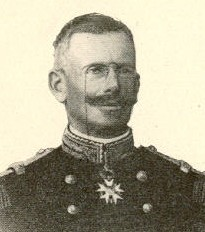
Lieutenant-Colonel Gustave Borgnis-Desbordes (1839–1900)

Had Herbinger but known it, his decision to abandon Lạng Sơn had been entirely unnecessary. On 29 March, while the French were retreating southwards, the demoralised Chinese were streaming back towards Zhennanguan, heading for the shelter of their entrenched camps at Bang Bo and Yen Cua Ai. Vietnamese sympathisers caught up with the Chinese near Cua Ai on the evening of 29 March, bringing the astonishing news that the French had abandoned Lạng Sơn and were in full retreat. The Chinese general Pan Dingxin promptly turned his battered army around and reoccupied Lạng Sơn on 30 March. Pan sent small forces of skirmishers on from Lạng Sơn to observe the French retreat, and it was these units which had made contact with the French on 30 March at Dong Song and on 31 March at Pho Cam. The main body of the Guangxi Army was in no condition to pursue the French to Chu, and Pan contented himself with a limited advance to Dong Song and Bắc Lệ. This advance brought the Chinese back to the positions they were occupying before the Lạng Sơn campaign. Herbinger's decision to retreat threw away the hard-won French gains of the February campaign.

When the 2nd Brigade eventually rallied at Chu, on 1 April, its soldiers were exhausted and demoralised. Brière de l'Isle, who had responded to Herbinger's cable of 28 March by transferring the bulk of Giovanninelli's 1st Brigade from Hưng Hóa to Chu, appointed Colonel Gustave Borgnis-Desbordes to the command of the 2nd Brigade. Borgnis-Desbordes soon effaced the memory of Herbinger's dismal leadership and imposed his own strong personality upon the brigade, issuing the following order of the day on 2 April:

Appelé, en raison de la grave blessure du général de Négrier, à prendre le commandement provisoire de la brigade, J'arrive ici avec des troupes nouvelles et des munitions. J'ai reçu du général l'ordre d'arrêter avec vous, et coûte que coûte, tout mouvement rétrograde. C'est ce que nous ferons.

(In view of General de Négrier's serious wound, I have been asked to take provisional command of the brigade. I have arrived with fresh troops and ammunition. I have been told by the general-in-chief that there is to be no further retreat. We are to remain here at all costs. And that is precisely what we shall do.)

On 5 April Brière de l'Isle arrived at Chu. He immediately ordered Borgnis-Desbordes to reoccupy the mountains of Deo Van and Deo Quan. He also considered attacking the Chinese at Dong Song, but the 2nd Brigade's corps of Vietnamese porters had scattered during the retreat, temporarily immobilising the brigade. Brière de l'Isle was still considering how to get at the Chinese when news of the conclusion of preliminaries of peace reached him on 14 April.

== The 'Tonkin Affair': the collapse of Ferry's government ==
In Paris, the political impact of Brière de l'Isle's pessimistic 'Lạng Sơn telegram' of 28 March was momentous. Ferry's immediate reaction was to reinforce the army in Tonkin, and indeed Brière de l'Isle quickly revised his estimate of the situation and advised the government that the front could soon be stabilised. However, his second thoughts came too late. When his first telegram was made public in Paris, there was an uproar in the Chamber of Deputies. The government's opponents, led by Georges Clemenceau, went on the attack. A motion of no confidence was tabled, and Ferry's government fell on 30 March amid almost unprecedented scenes of uproar. 'Throw Ferry in the Seine! Kill the Tonkinese!' the crowds shouted. Ferry never recovered from the Tonkin Affair. He never again became premier, and his political influence during the rest of his career was severely limited. His successor, Charles de Freycinet, moved quickly to negotiate a ceasefire and provisional peace agreement.

China, for its part, had suffered a major defeat at the hands of the French navy on 31 March (a development that received little attention in metropolitan France), and was also wary of a possible war with Japan over their competing interests in Korea. The Qing government was thus unusually eager to come to terms. Qing negotiators immediately agreed to implement the Tientsin Accord (implicitly recognising the French protectorate over Tonkin), and the French government dropped its demand for an indemnity for the Bắc Lệ ambush. A peace protocol ending hostilities was signed on 4 April, and a substantive peace treaty was signed on 9 June by Li Hongzhang and the French minister Jules Patenôtre.

== Herbinger affair ==
Brière de l'Isle was understandably furious at Herbinger's conduct, and a commission of enquiry was held in Hanoi during the autumn of 1885 to determine whether his decision to abandon Lạng Sơn had been justified. Most of the officers of the Tonkin expeditionary corps believed that Herbinger had made a ghastly mistake, and would have been happy to see him broken and dismissed from the service. But Brière de l'Isle and Borgnis-Desbordes, who drew up much of the evidence against Herbinger, overplayed their hand, insinuating that Herbinger had been drunk when he took the decision to retreat from Lạng Sơn. This shabby charge dismayed many officers, and won Herbinger a certain degree of sympathy.

Herbinger at first seemed to realise that he had made an appalling blunder, and spoke about retrieving his honour by falling in battle. Back at Chu, shortly after the end of the retreat, he was heard to say, 'Whoever could have imagined it? Why haven't the Chinese attacked us? Well, I know what I have to do now! In the next battle, I'll have to get myself killed!'. But the war ended before Herbinger had the chance to risk his life in battle, and he soon had a change of heart. He decided to defend his conduct by attacking de Négrier's decision to attack the Chinese at Bang Bo, claiming that the 2nd Brigade's morale was shaky, and alleging that, as an officer of the metropolitan army, he had been the victim of a plot by the Legion and marine infantry officers who ran the Tonkin expeditionary corps. There was little substance in any of this, but it rang warning bells back in Paris. The army ministry, alarmed at the prospect of seeing so much dirty linen washed in public, brought the enquiry to an early end. Herbinger escaped without a formal censure, but the commission of enquiry recommended that he should not be given any further field commands. He died in 1886, at the age of 46.

== Significance ==
The longer-term domestic political repercussions of the retreat from Lạng Sơn were considerable. The ignominious end to the Sino-French War temporarily checked French domestic fervor for colonial expansion and culminated in the 'Tonkin Debate' of December 1885, in which the Chamber of Deputies voted to sustain the French commitment in Tonkin by the very narrowest of margins. Other French colonial projects, including the conquest of Madagascar, were deferred for several years.

While the retreat from Lạng Sơn was in progress, there were wild rumours in France that the 2nd Brigade had been routed and had suffered appalling casualties. These rumours stubbornly refused to go away, and in time a legend was born, of 'the Lạng Sơn disaster', which would persist for decades. As late as 1937, one French historian wrote: 'Even today, a half-century after these events, the name of this small and unremarkable town evokes in French ears the memory of a great battle lost.'
