= Laurent Giovanninelli =

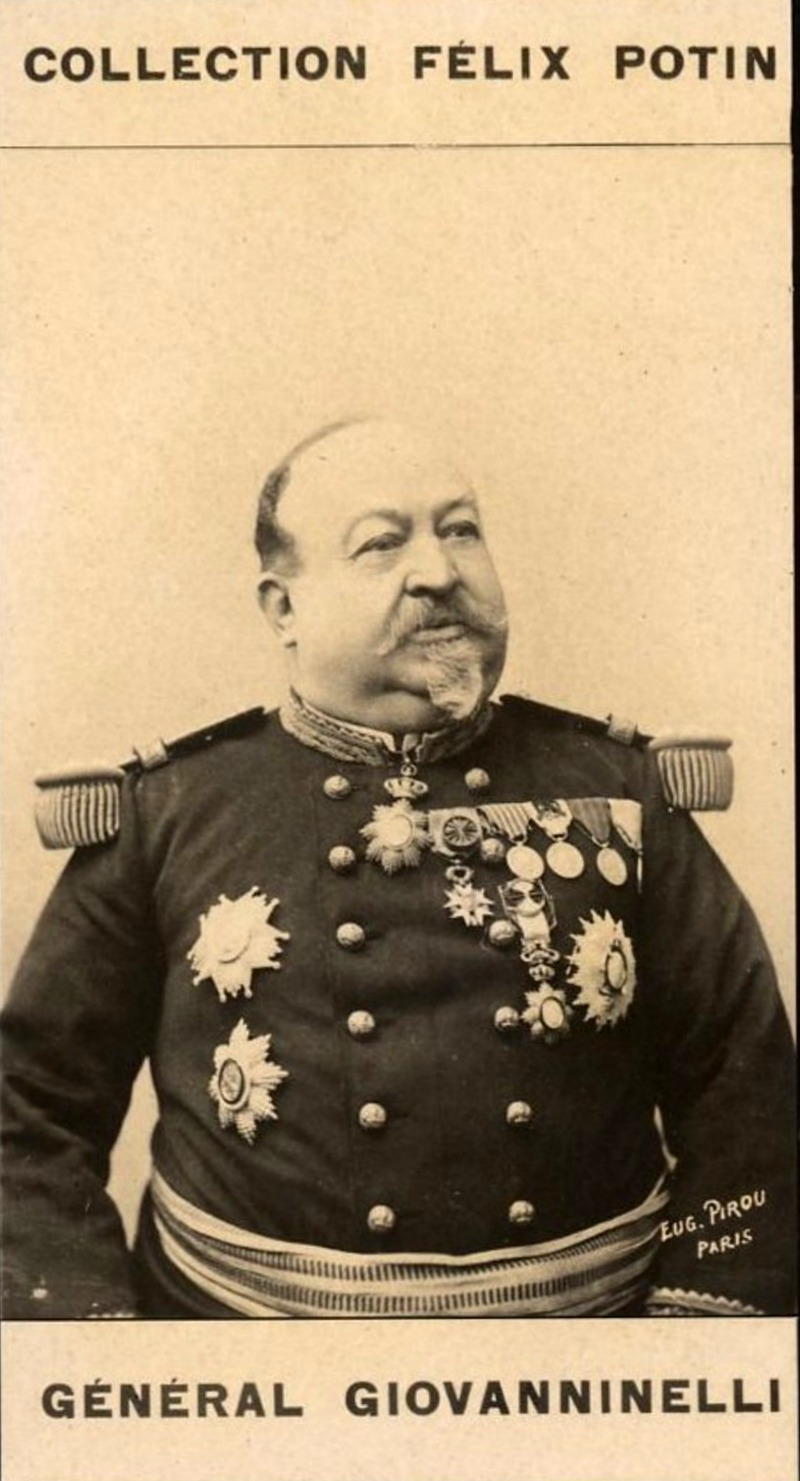
- Born: Angel Laurent Giovaninelli; 15 September 1837; Castello-di-Rostino, Corsica, Kingdom of France
- Died: 28 August 1903 (aged 65); Frénois, Meuse, French Republic
- Military career
- Allegiance: French Empire; French Republic
- Service years: 1855 – 1899
- Rank: Division general
- Conflicts: Crimean War; French conquest of Algeria; Second Italian War of Independence; Second French intervention in Mexico; Franco-Prussian War: Battle of Amiens (WIA); Sino-French War: Lạng Sơn campaign; Battle of Hòa Mộc
- Awards: Legion of Honour

Angel Laurent Giovaninelli, born on 15 September 1837 in Pastoreccia-di-Rostino in Corsica; died on 28 August 1903 in Frénois (Meuse), was a major general of the French army.

== Biography ==
Born on 15 September 1837 in Castello-di-Rostino in Corsica, he was admitted to the Special Military School of Saint-Cyr in 1855 ( promotion from Sébastopol ) then completed his entire career in the Infantry .

He was then promoted to sub-lieutenant at twenty, he served in Algeria and fought in Italy and Mexico (where he was wounded) in the Foreign Legion up to the rank of captain. And he was again promoted battalion commander during the Franco-Prussian War, where he commanded the 2nd battalion of foot hunters and the 19th marching battalion of the same weapon. He is injured on 27 November 1870 at the Battle of Amiens, and served with the Versailles troops against the Paris Commune in 1871. Promoted to colonel on 22 August 1880. He took command of the 128th Infantry Regiment in Sedan. In 1884, he was appointed to command in Tonkin a marching regiment made up of three battalions of line infantry.

During the Sino-French War, he was part of the two French brigades which went up Upper Tonkin and in February 1885 conquered the town of Lạng Sơn, in the north of present-day Vietnam. The first brigade, led by Giovanninelli (promoted to brigadier general on 4 March 1885) and Brigadier General Louis Brière de l'Isle, left Lạng Sơn to come to the aid of the besieged of Tuyên Quang . Most of his troops were then entrusted with to General Giovanninelli to rally the other brigade on 30 March, which had operated the much contested Lang Son Retreat and stabilize the situation, until the signing of a peace treaty.

Giovanninelli was a founding member of the Société de géographie de Lyon, Giovanninelli was elevated to the rank of major general on 12 July 1890. After successively commanding the 13th Infantry Division and the 3rd army corps, he was appointed president of the infantry Committee in 1894 and sits on the Supreme War Council. He was present at the inauguration of the National and Colonial Exhibition in Rouen in 1896. He received the Grand Cross of the Legion of Honor in 1899, and died on his property in Frénois, near Sedan, at the age of 65. .
