= Paul-Gustave Herbinger =

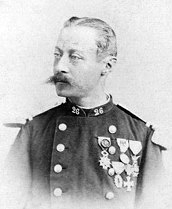
- Born: December 7, 1839; Strasbourg, Bas-Rhin, Kingdom of France
- Died: May 26, 1886 (aged 46); Paris, Seine, French Republic
- Burial place: Montparnasse Cemetery, Paris, France
- Military career
- Allegiance: French Empire; French Republic
- Branch: French Army
- Service years: October 1, 1861 – 1886
- Rank: Lieutenant Colonel
- Conflicts: Franco-Prussian War: Siege of Metz (POW); Paris Commune (WIA); Sino-French War: Battle of Đồng Đăng; Battle of Bang Bo; Retreat from Lạng Sơn

Paul-Gustave Herbinger (1839-1886) was a French Lieutenant Colonel who was best known for his role in the Retreat from Lạng Sơn in the Sino-French War.

== Biography ==
Paul-Gustave Herbinger was the son of Paul Herbinger who was a battalion commander in the 20th light and Octavie Bertrand. Paul-Gustave Herbinger was a direct descendant of a brother of Joan of Arc He graduated as a major from the École spéciale militaire de Saint-Cyr. On October 1, 1861, Herbinger was promoted to second lieutenant and he was assigned to 96th Infantry Regiment 3 and graduated first from the shooting school. With the 95th line infantry regiment, he took part in the Second French intervention in Mexico from August 1862 to May 1867. He was promoted to lieutenant on April 12, 1865. Then he was appointed captain on August 7, 1869.

During the Franco-Prussian War when he was appointed captain adjutant-major in August, he was taken prisoner during the Siege of Metz and he was not released until April 1871 after the end of the war. Back in Paris, he fought the Communards and was wounded in the head. He was appointed battalion commander and from May 4, 1876, to July 21, 1884, Herbinger had a controversial career.

Herbinger then became a professor of military tactics at the École spéciale militaire de Saint-Cyr, and commander of the 26th rifle battalion. He had a reputation of being "hot headed" which can date back to 1881. On March 24, 1885, Herbinger along with General Oscar de Négrier participated in the Battle of Bang Bo which concluded the success of the Lạng Sơn campaign of the previous month. Herbinger then was acting commander of the 2nd Brigade and organized the extremely controversial Retreat from Lạng Sơn: not content to downgrade to Dong Song and Than Moï. Herbinger sent alarmist cables from Lang Son to Louis Brière de l'Isle who, without bothering to sift through the misleading information they contained, in concluded very hastily that the Red River Delta was in danger and who sent and on the evening of March 28, a pessimistic telegram to the French government which was the trigger for the end of the Tonkin Campaign and which also ended Jules Ferry's political career.

Herbinger then died on May 26, 1886, and was buried in the Montparnasse Cemetery, on his grave, a bust of Antoine Étex represents him.

== Bibliography ==
- Jacques Harmant, The truth about the retirement of Lang-Son: memoirs of a fighter, ed. A. Savine, 1892, Author: Verdier, Armand.
- Barthélemy-Edmond Palat, The French Expeditions to Tonkin, vol. 2, The military spectator, 1888, p. 344-5 .
- François Thierry, Le Trésor de Huê: a hidden face of the colonization of Indochina, Paris, Nouveau Monde éditions, 2014 (Online)
- Caricature of Herbinger by Alfred Le Petit in Le Grelot 1885
- The XIX'th Century, 6/10/1886; p. 2 .
