= Su Yuanchun =

Chinese general (1844–1908)

Su Yuanchun 蘇元春
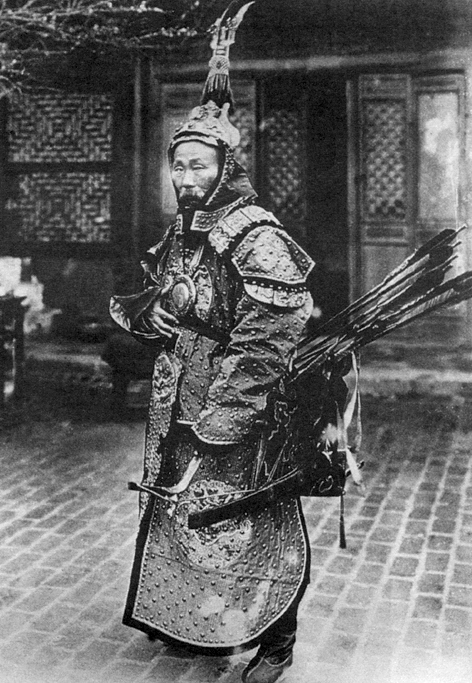
- Su Yuanchun in 1896
- Born: February 8, 1844; Yong'an, Guangxi, China
- Died: June 13, 1908 (aged 64); Dihua, Xinjiang, China
- Military career
- Allegiance: China
- Branch: Imperial Chinese Army
- Service years: 1863–1903
- Rank: General
- Units: Xiang Army; Guangxi Army
- Conflicts: Taiping Rebellion; Miao Rebellion; Sino-French War: Battle of Zhennan Pass

Su Yuanchun, courtesy name Zixi (February 8, 1844 – June 13, 1908) was a Chinese general and statesman who was a fierce anti-French activist. One of the main commanders behind the Sino-French War, he served as a general of the Xiang Army as well as a prominent politician in his home province of Guangxi.

== Biography ==
=== Early years ===
Yuanchun was born on February 8, 1844, on Yong'an, Guangxi. His father, Su Baode, once served as the regimental commander of Yong'an Prefecture, was killed by the Taiping Heavenly Army. His brother Su Yuanzhang joined the Tiandi Society led by Zhang Gaoyou in 1855 to avenge his father's death. When Su was helpless and was arrested by the government for stealing at the age of 12, he defected to Su Yuanzhang along with his cousin, Su Yuanrui to join the Xiang Army of Xi Baotian and Yuanchun was the centurion of the army.The Xiang Army would go on to capture several Taiping commanders at Shicheng, Jiangxi and would suppress the rest of the Taiping Heavenly Army at Guangdong and Jiangxi.

In 1867, Su Yuanchun was ordered to go to Guizhou to suppress the Miao Rebellion and killed the Miao people's leader Zhang Xiumei, and was successively promoted the deputy general and the chief soldier. In May 1871, Su Yuanchun was named admiral, and in 1878 he was stationed back at Yongzhou, Hunan.

=== Sino-French War ===
After the Sino-French War broke out, China was losing the overland campaign in Vietnam and on 1884, Beining fell to the French and Xu Yanxu was ousted from the post of Governor of Guangxi after being convicted of crimes and the Qing courts got Pan Dingxin to replace him and Su was ordered to muster around 2,400 soldiers to fight off the French at Vietnam. On June, Su Yuanchun was promoted to Admiral of Guangxi and commanded the Guangxi Army at Beiqi, Vietnam. During this time, he would gather up infantry from Gui, Hunan, Hubei and Huai to assist Feng Zicai in wall construction and when the Battle of Zhennan Pass occurred when the French arrived, the French were defeated and for the Chinese victory at Zhennan Pass, Su was awarded the third-class light car captain and was later rewarded with the Prince's Shaobao and the second-class light car captain. He would also begin to serve as an assistant for military affairs outside the customs.

=== Construction career ===
With the French colonization of Vietnam, Su organized an army to guard the French border, deploying troops separately, strictly rectified, and supervised the drills as the French were set on expanding their influence to Southeast China. He also repaired the Zhennan Pass as well as the gates and established 165 forts and watchtowers, 109 passes, and 66 checkpoints. When Su Yuanchun made his headquarters at Longzhou, he built some military roads along the way, dredged the Ming River and established the Yonglong Car Ferry Company through a joint-stock partnership between officials and businessmen to ensure the smooth transportation of military materials and promote the development of the local economy. When he arrived at Longzhou, he also established the Manufacturing Bureau, Gunpowder Bureau, Military Uniform Bureau there. When he moved back to the Sino-French border, he encouraged the guards to have their relatives move to the frontier with the promise of allocating funds for housing. Later on, he opened up some coal mines at Southern Xinjiang, established trade markets to promote the economic circulation of commodities and established the Tongfeng Academy.

=== Controversy ===
After the Guangxi frontier defense construction project was completed, Su Yuanchun was ordered to visit Beijing on May 9, 1899, and received the courtesy of riding a horse in the Forbidden City but shortly after that, the Qing government notified Su that France was aiming for Southeast China and was particularly aiming for Guangzhou Bay. Su Yuanchun, who was in the capital, was appointed as an imperial envoy to negotiate with France. He then signed the "Guangzhou Bay Concession Treaty" with France after the Qing courts encouraged him to do so on November 16, 1899, and leased Dahaoheshan to France however shortly after, he was relieved from this position and was now in a state of failure as many criticized and reviled him for signing the treaty in the first place.

The Qing courts deemed Su Yuanchun to be working in Guangxi for too long and in order to prevent the province from decline, the Qing court wanted to transfer him to Jiangnan to train the new army there and to exchange with the admiral of Hubei, Xia Yuxiu but said transfer was unsuccessful due to Su deemed to be pressed.

In 1902, after Wang Zhichun took office as the governor of Guangxi, he was at odds with Su Yuanchun, and he impeached Su for being "long neglected and arrogant..."Not long after, Zhou Shumo also impeached Su Yuanchun's inability to fight against the Party and You Yong. Therefore, the Qing court ordered the new governor of Guangdong and Guangxi, Cen Chunxuan to investigate the case of Su Yuanchun. Cen Chunxuan originally had a holiday with Su Yuanchun, and on the basis of "striving for the people", he followed through with Su's suggestions for the deduction of soldiers' pay and wrote a poem to the rebels before Su was dismissed and imprisoned on May 13 for a variety of possible reasons.

=== Release and death ===
After being imprisoned, Su Yuanchun defended himself and pleaded guilty, and many others defended the document, but the Qing court didn't accept it, and only changed his death penalty to be assigned to Xinjiang to conscript the army. While Su Yuanchun was serving his sentence, someone sued Cen Chunxuan for "injustice against a competent person". The Qing court ordered the new governor of Guangdong and Guangxi, Zhang Renjun, to review the case. The result proved that Su Yuanchun was wronged and falsely accused. On June 13, 1908, Su Yuanchun, who had served for more than 4 years, was released. However, on his way back home, he contracted some diseases, and the treatment was ineffective. He died in Dihua (modern-day Ürümqi). In 1909, the Qing court rehabilitated Su Yuanchun, opened an official restoration, and gave his life and military exploits to the historical museum for biography.
