= Lạng Sơn campaign =

1885 French offensive in Sino-French War

- Part of the Tonkin campaign, Sino-French War
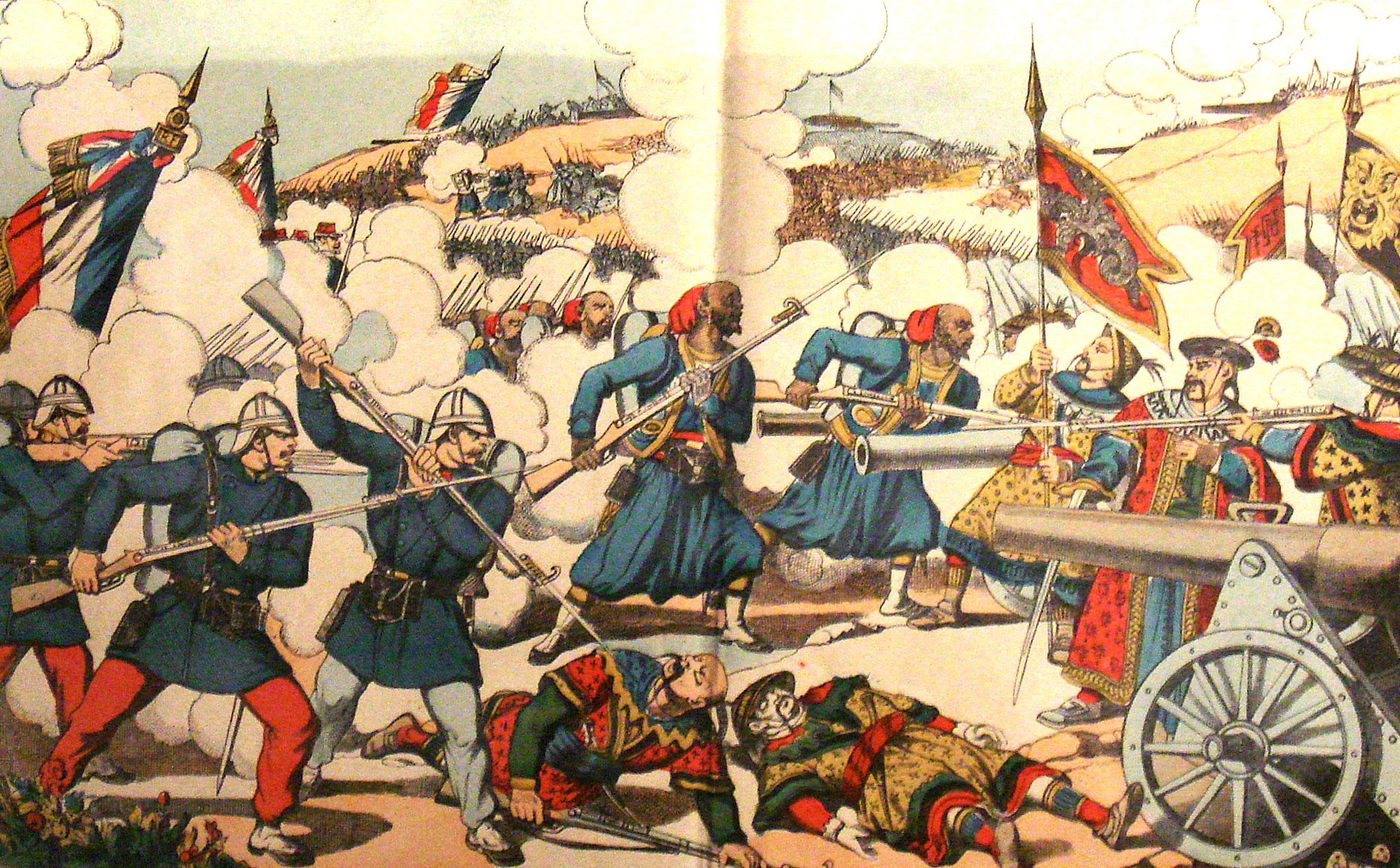
- Capture of Lạng Sơn, 13 February 1885
Date	3 –13 February 1885
Location	Lạng Sơn, northern Vietnam
Result	French victory

Belligerents
France: French Cochinchina	Qing dynasty

Commanders and leaders
Louis Brière de l'Isle; François de Négrier; Laurent Giovanninelli	Pan Dingxin; Feng Zicai

Strength
7,200 combatants 4,500 coolies	20,000 men

Casualties and losses
Tay Hoa: 18 dead, 101 wounded Ha Hoa: 4 dead, 18 wounded Dong Song: 3 dead, 41 wounded Pho Vy: 1 dead, 23 wounded Bac Vie: 30 dead, 188 wounded Total: 56 Dead, 371 wounded	Unknown

The Lạng Sơn campaign (3 to 13 February 1885) was a major French offensive in Tonkin (northern Vietnam) during the Sino-French War (August 1884–April 1885). The Tonkin Expeditionary Corps, under the command of General Louis Brière de l'Isle, defeated the Chinese Guangxi Army and captured the strategically important town of Lạng Sơn in a ten-day campaign mounted under formidable logistical constraints.

== Campaign preparations, January 1885 ==
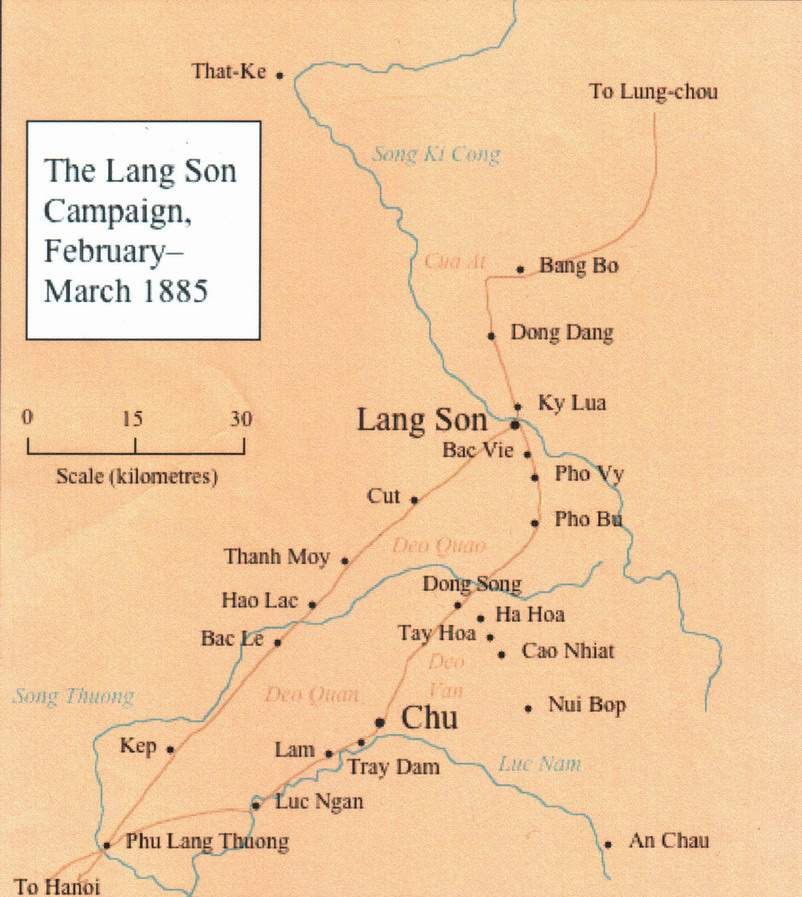
The Lạng Sơn campaign, February 1885

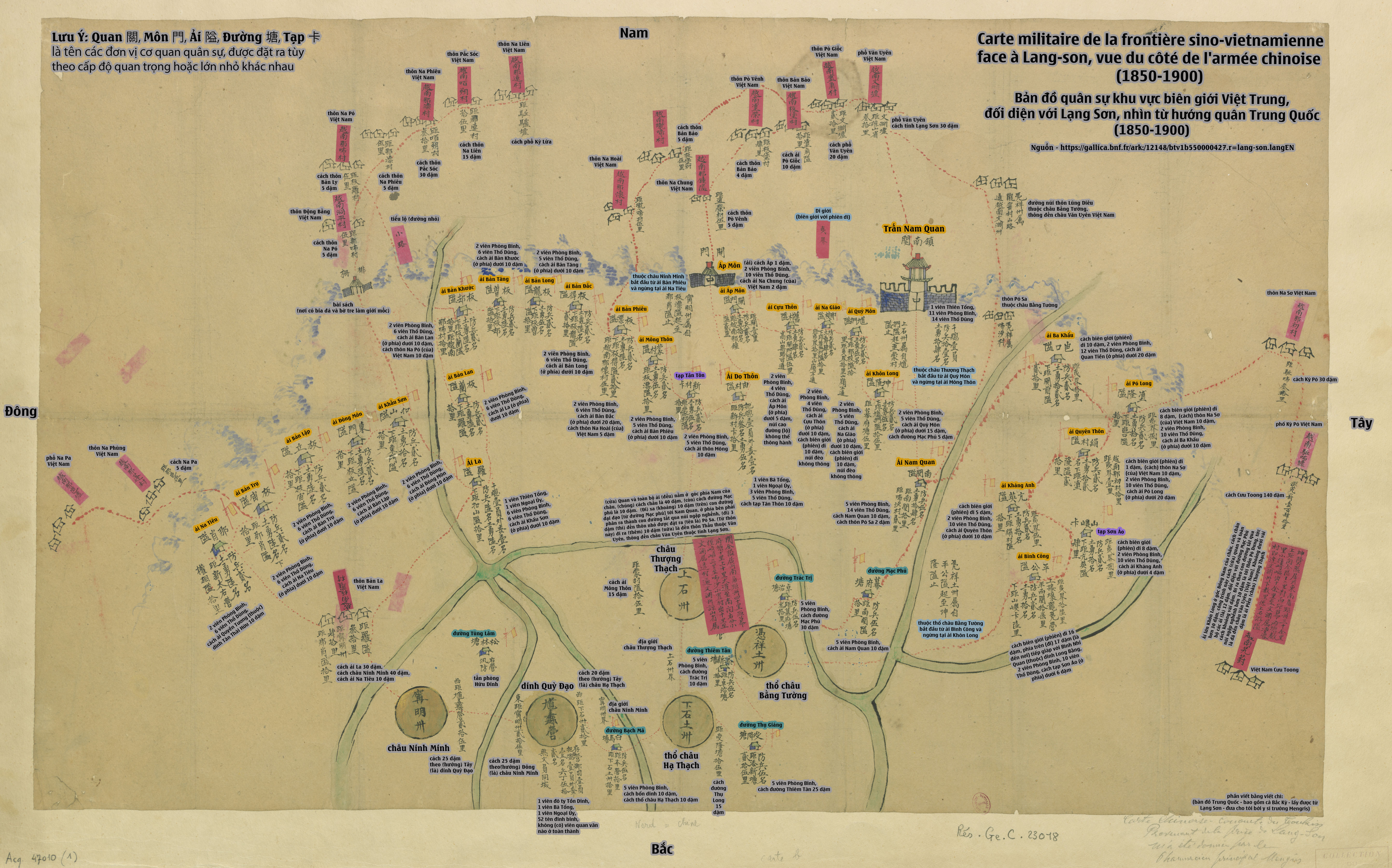
Military map of the Sino-Vietnamese border facing Lang-son, seen from the side of the Chinese army (1850-1900)

French strategy in Tonkin was the subject of a bitter debate in the Chamber of Deputies in late December 1884. The army minister General Jean-Baptiste-Marie Campenon argued that the French should consolidate their hold on the Delta. His opponents urged an all-out offensive to throw the Chinese out of northern Tonkin. The debate culminated in Campenon's resignation and his replacement as army minister by the hawkish General Jules Lewal. On 5 January 1885 Lewal ordered Brière de l'Isle to 'capture Lạng Sơn as soon as possible'.

Long-range planning for a campaign against Lạng Sơn had been underway for several months, and Brière de l'Isle had already assembled large French forces at the French forward base of Chu (now in Bắc Giang Province) on the Luc Nam River, which had been occupied by the French in the wake of the Kep campaign (October 1884). On 3 and 4 January 1885, General de Négrier attacked and defeated a substantial detachment of the Guangxi Army that had concentrated around the nearby village of Núi Bop to try to disrupt the French preparations. De Nègrier's victory at Núi Bop, won at odds of just under one to ten, was regarded by his fellow-officers as the most spectacular professional triumph of his career.

Logistical arrangements for the Lạng Sơn campaign were formidable. It would take the column around ten days to advance to the outskirts of Lạng Sơn. The troops would be burdened with the weight of their provisions and equipment, and would have to march through an extremely difficult country. The nights, in Tonkin in February, would be bitterly cold. Supplying the column with food and ammunition would tax the ingenuity of the marine infantry officers responsible for the mule trains and the coolies. It took the French a month to complete their preparations for the campaign, but by the end of January 1885, Brière de l'Isle had assembled an expeditionary column of just under 7,200 troops, accompanied by 4,500 coolies, at Chu.

== French high command, Lạng Sơn campaign ==
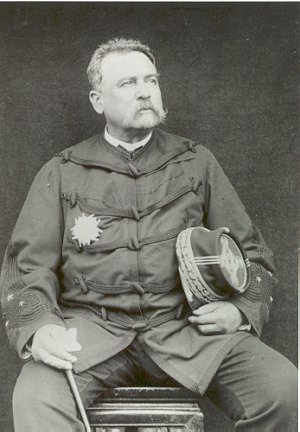
General Louis Brière de l'Isle (1827–96)

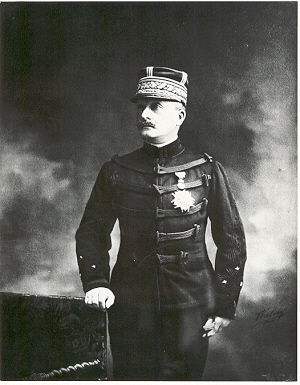
General François de Négrier (1842–1913)

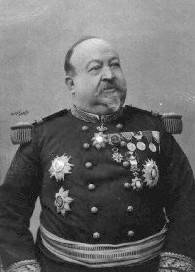
Colonel Ange-Laurent Giovanninelli (1839–1903)

== French order of battle ==
The Lạng Sơn expeditionary column (colonne expéditionnaire de Lang-Son) was organised around the two brigades originally established by General Millot in January 1885. Each brigade contained two marching regiments (régiments de marche), each of two or three battalions, with supporting artillery and Tonkinese skirmishers, and was accompanied by field hospital and engineering detachments. Giovanninelli's 1st Brigade consisted of a two-battalion marine infantry regiment, a two-battalion regiment of Algerian riflemen (Turcos), a battalion of Tonkinese riflemen and three artillery batteries. De Négrier's 2nd Brigade consisted of a 'French' regiment of three line infantry battalions from the metropolitan army, an 'Algerian' regiment of two Foreign Legion battalions and one battalion of African Light Infantry, a battalion of Tonkinese riflemen and three artillery batteries:

- 1st Brigade (Colonel Ange-Laurent Giovanninelli)
  - 1st Marching Regiment (Lieutenant-Colonel Chaumont)
    - marine infantry battalion (chef de bataillon Mahias)
    - marine infantry battalion (chef de bataillon Lambinet)
  - 2nd Marching Regiment (Lieutenant-Colonel Letellier)
    - 3rd Battalion, 3rd Algerian Rifle Regiment (chef de bataillon de Mibielle)
    - 4th Battalion, 1st Algerian Rifle Regiment (chef de bataillon Comoy)
  - 1st Battalion, 2nd Tonkinese Rifle Regiment (chef de bataillon Tonnot)
  - Brigade artillery (chef d'escadron Levrard)
    - 3rd, 4th and 5th Marine Artillery Batteries bis (Captains Roussel, Roperh and Péricaud). (Note: Mahias's battalion consisted of the 25th, 29th, 34th and 36th Companies, 1st Marine Infantry Regiment (Captains Tailland, Salles, Hougnon and Bourguignon). Lambinet's battalion included the 25th A, 28th and 31st D Companies, 1st Marine Infantry Regiment (Captains Chanu, Herbin and de Damian) and a fourth, unidentified company (Lieutenant de l'Étoile). De Mibielle's Turco battalion was the 3rd Battalion, 3rd Algerian Rifle Regiment (Captains Camper, Chirouze, Polère and Valet). Comoy's Turco battalion was the 4th Battalion, 1st Algerian Rifle Regiment (Captains Gérôme, Boëlle, Bigot and Rollandes).)
- 2nd Brigade (général de brigade François de Négrier)
  - 3rd Marching Regiment (Lieutenant-Colonel Herbinger)
    - 23rd Line Infantry Battalion (Lieutenant-Colonel Godart)
    - 111th Line Infantry Battalion (chef de bataillon Faure)
    - 143rd Line Infantry Battalion (chef de bataillon Farret)
  - 4th Marching Regiment (Lieutenant-Colonel Donnier)
    - 2nd Foreign Legion Battalion (chef de bataillon Diguet)
    - 3rd Foreign Legion Battalion (Lieutenant-Colonel Schoeffer)
    - 2nd African Light Infantry Battalion (chef de bataillon Servière)
  - 1st Battalion, 1st Tonkinese Rifle Regiment (chef de bataillon Jorna de Lacale)
  - Brigade artillery (chef d'escadron de Douvres)
    - 1st Marine Artillery Battery bis (Captain Martin)
    - 11th and 12th Batteries, 12th Army Artillery Regiment (Captains Jourdy and de Saxcé).

The strengths of the infantry battalions varied considerably, depending on how long they had been in Tonkin. The battalions which had served longest in the Tonkin campaign could only with difficulty field as many as 500 men, while Schoeffer and Comoy's recently arrived battalions could put 800 rifles into line.

== The Lạng Sơn campaign, February 1885 ==
=== Capture of Cao Nhiat, 3 February ===
Shortly after midnight on 2 February the expeditionary corps set off from Chu, with de Négrier's 2nd Brigade leading the way, and advanced over the mountain of Deo Van to Cao Nhiat without meeting any enemy resistance. At Cao Nhiat the French captured an important Chinese rice dump, easing their supply difficulties.

=== Battle of Tay Hoa, 4 February ===
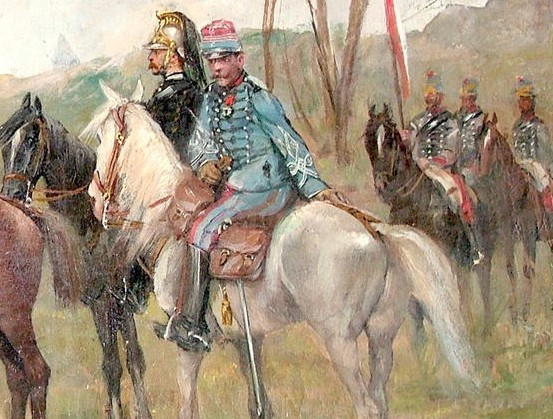
Lieutenant-Colonel Paul-Gustave Herbinger (detail from a painting by Albert Bligny)

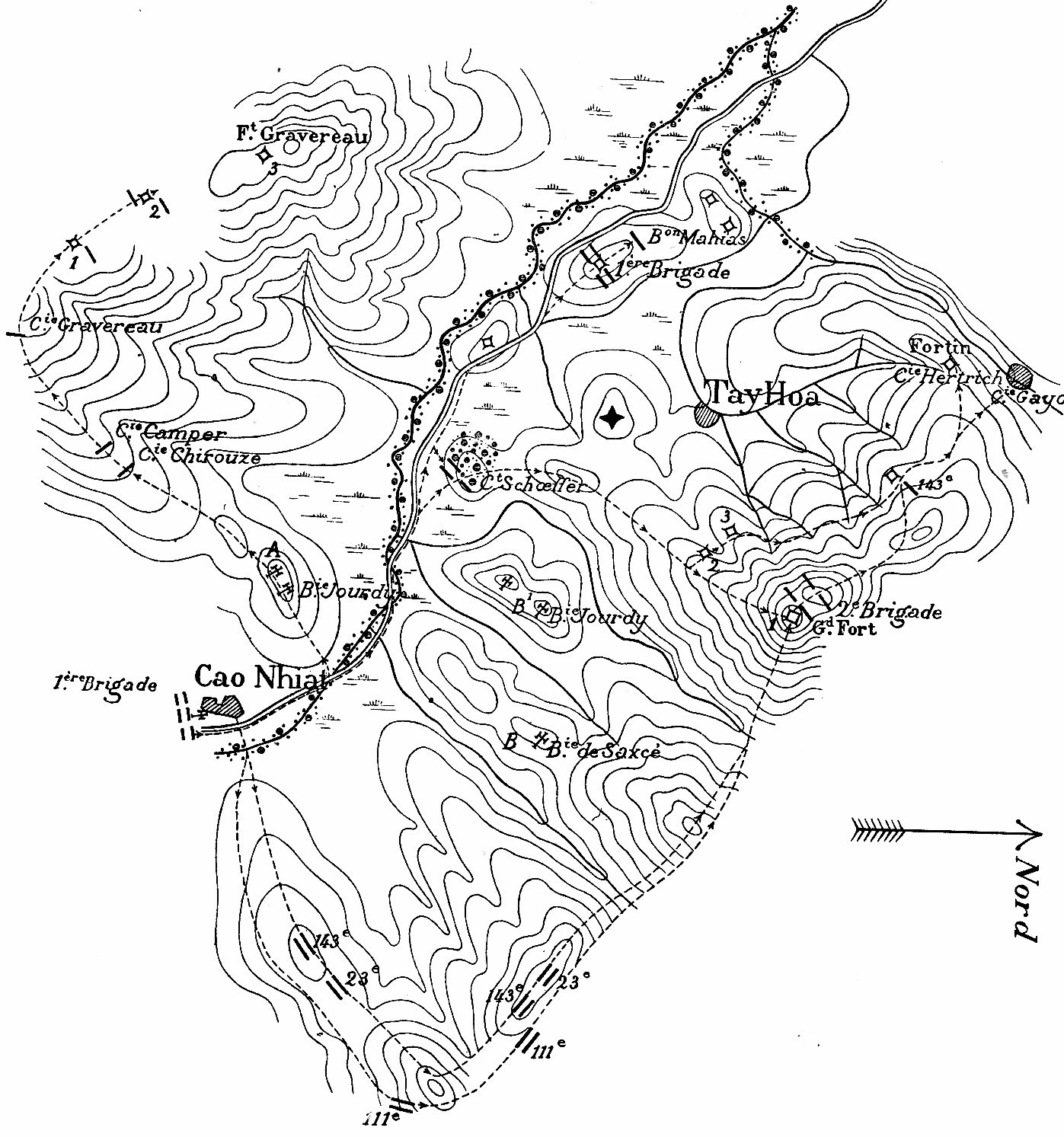
Map of the battle of Tay Hoa, 4 February 1885

On 4 February the expeditionary corps fought its first action with the Chinese, at Tay Hoa. The battle was fought almost wholly by de Négrier's 2nd Brigade, which was leading the march, and demonstrated the unfitness for field command of Lieutenant-Colonel Paul-Gustave Herbinger, the French commander who would in late March 1885 give the controversial order for the Retreat from Lạng Sơn. Ordered to capture the 'Great Fort', the key to the Chinese position, with his three French line battalions, Herbinger made an elaborate flank march which exhausted his troops and wasted valuable time. At length, seeing his operational timetable threatened, de Négrier ordered Schoeffer's 3rd Legion Battalion to take the fort instead. The legionnaires scrambled rapidly up the mountain paths towards the Chinese position and captured it under Herbinger's nose. Meanwhile, on the other side of the battlefield, Captain Gravereau's company of Diguet's 2nd Legion Battalion was isolated and surrounded by the Chinese. The company was eventually disengaged by its comrades, but suffered heavy losses. Although the battle was indisputably a French victory, French casualties were disconcertingly heavy: 18 dead and 101 wounded, most of them in Diguet and Schoeffer's Legion battalions. These were the heaviest casualties the French had suffered in a single engagement since the start of the Sino-French War.

=== Actions at Ha Hoa and Dong Song, 5 and 6 February ===
On 5 February the French assaulted the main complex of forts defending the Chinese entrenched camp at Dong Song, around Ha Hoa. The two French brigades attacked side by side. The 1st Brigade, on the left, overran a number of Chinese forts before their defenders could escape, and wiped out the garrisons by blowing in the roofs with dynamite. The 2nd Brigade, on the right, captured the principal Chinese work of Pins Parasols, so named because it had been built around a conspicuous clump of umbrella pines. The speed of the French attacks, prepared by artillery, kept the Chinese off balance throughout the battle, and French casualties were relatively low: 4 dead and 18 wounded.

On 6 February the French fought a morning action to clear the Chinese from their last defences before Dong Song, and took possession of the entrenched camp of Dong Song in the afternoon. French casualties in this action were 3 dead and 41 wounded. Brière de l'Isle had been hoping to push the Chinese back across the mountain of Deo Quao into the Song Thuong valley, away from Lạng Sơn, but most of the Chinese troops fell back up the Dong Song valley to Pho Bu, where they could make a further stand for Lạng Sơn.

=== Action at Deo Quao, 9 February ===
The capture of Dong Song threatened the supply line of the Guangxi Army's right wing at Bắc Lệ, and the Chinese hastily pulled back from Bắc Lệ and retreated up the Mandarin Road to Thanh Moy. To cover their retreat they attacked the French outposts on the mountain of Deo Quao on 9 February. The French units on Deo Quao easily repelled this attack, but the diversion allowed the Guangxi Army to regroup and make a final stand in front of Lạng Sơn.

=== Action at Pho Vy, 11 February ===
After a pause for breath at Dong Song to resupply with food and ammunition and to establish a shorter supply line back to Chu across the mountain of Deo Quan, the Tonkin expeditionary corps pressed on towards Lạng Sơn. On 11 February the 2nd Brigade, at the head of the French column, contacted advance elements of the Guangxi Army at Pho Vy. The Chinese were ejected from the village of Pho Vy by Herbinger's three French battalions with little difficulty, but they brought up their reserves and mounted a counterattack against Herbinger's regiment which forced de Negrier to commit Diguet's Legion battalion to drive them off. Towards the end of the battle the 111th Battalion stormed a Chinese hill position under the eyes of the rest of the brigade. 2nd Lieutenant Rene Normand, who fell a month later in the Battle of Bang Bo and whose letters from Tonkin were published after his death, distinguished himself in this action. Towards evening the Chinese fell back on their main body at Bac Vie. French casualties at Pho Vy were slight: a total of 1 dead and 23 wounded.

=== Battle of Bac Vie, 12 February ===
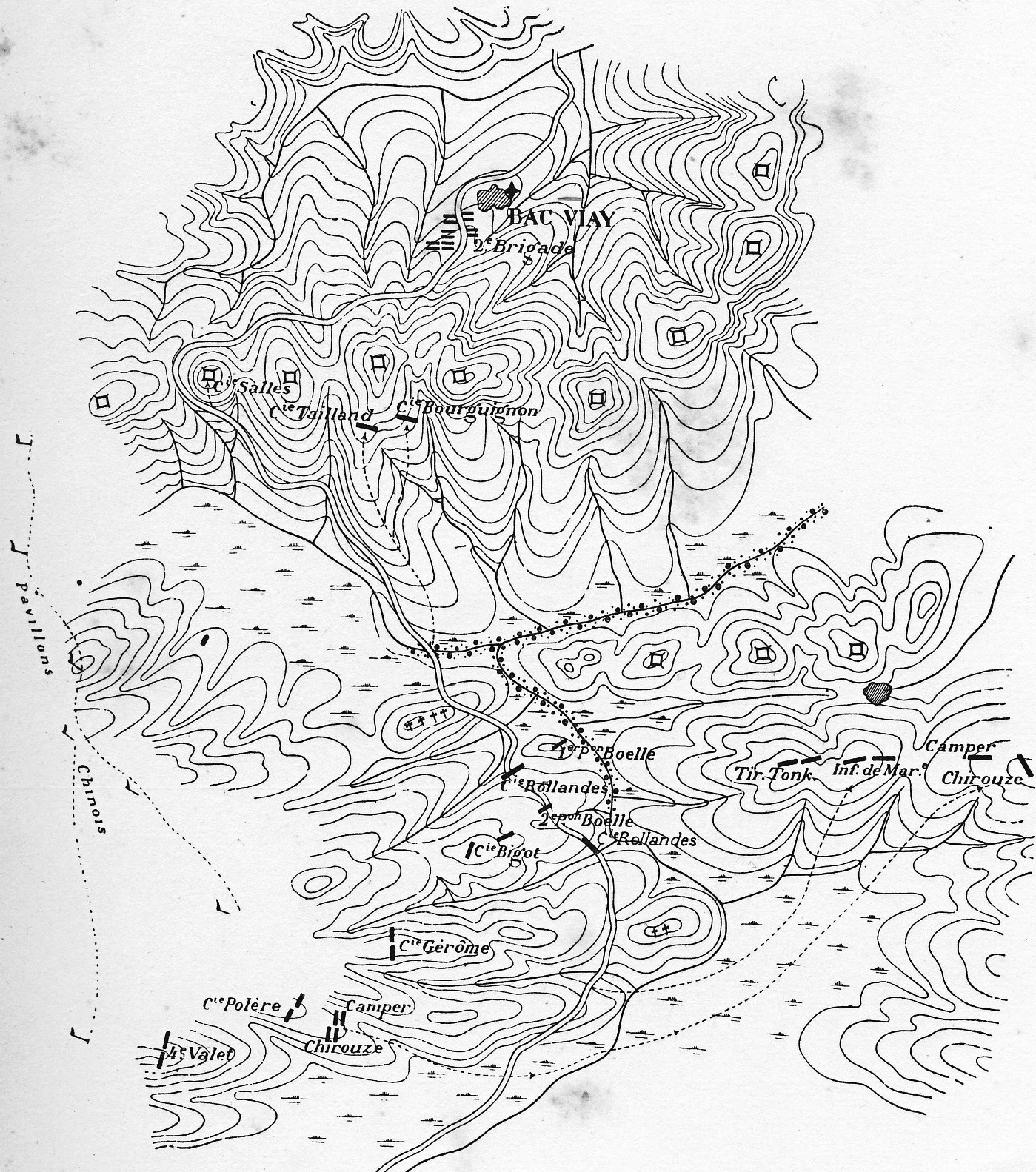
Map of the battle of Bac Vie, 12 February 1885

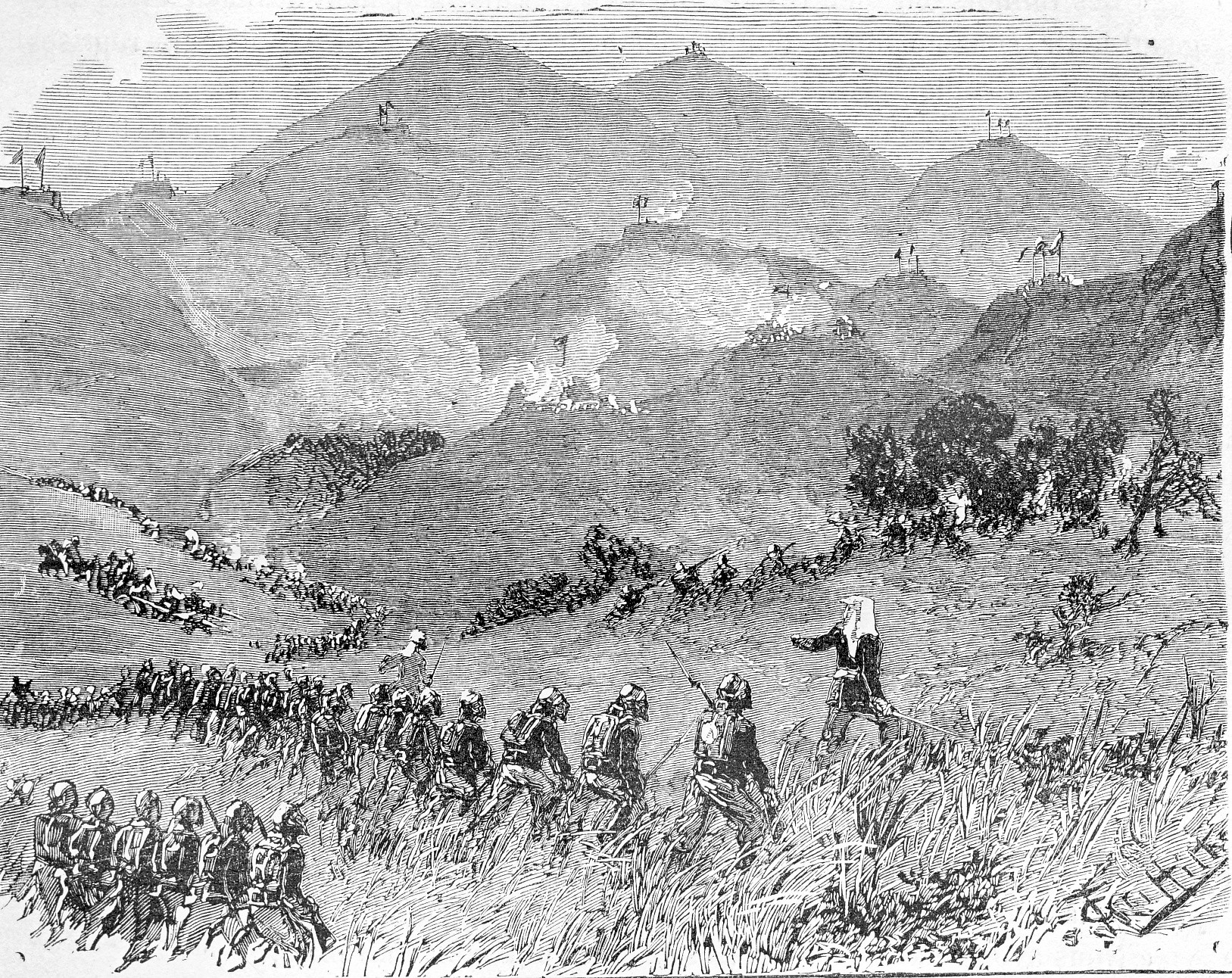
French troops advance on Chinese hill positions during the battle of Bac Vie

The culminating battle for Lạng Sơn was fought on 12 February at Bac Vie, several kilometres to the south of Lạng Sơn. Giovanninelli's 1st Brigade was leading the French column, and de Négrier's 2nd Brigade took little part in the battle. In a costly but successful assault, Giovanninelli's Turcos and marine infantry stormed the Chinese defences. The battle was fought in thick fog, allowing the Chinese to mount a dangerous counterattack at one point that nearly swept away part of Giovanninelli's brigade. Eventually the French broke through the Chinese centre, and the isolated Chinese wings retreated in disorder back to Lạng Sơn. French casualties at Bac Vie were 30 dead and 188 wounded, the highest casualties of the campaign. Most of these casualties were sustained by the two Turco battalions in Giovanninelli's brigade, which had borne the brunt of the battle. Chef d'escadron Levrard, the 1st Brigade's artillery commander, was shot dead during the battle, and Brière de l'Isle's officier d'ordonnance 2nd Lieutenant Bossant, the son of a senior French general, was killed at Brière de l'Isle's side.

=== Capture of Lạng Sơn and action at Ky Lua, 13 February ===
On 13 February the French column entered Lạng Sơn, which the Chinese abandoned after fighting a token rearguard action at the nearby village of Ky Lua. In compliment to their performance at Bac Vie, Brière de l'Isle gave Giovanninelli's Turcos and marine infantry the honour of leading the French entry into Lạng Sơn. The Guangxi Army fell back towards the Chinese border and occupied a strong defensive position at Dong Dang, a small town just in Tonkinese territory.

== Orders of the Day ==
Brière de l'Isle issued two orders of the day during the Lạng Sơn campaign. The first, issued on 7 February, marked the capture of the Chinese entrenched camp of Dong Song:

Les formidables camps retranchés de Ha-Hoa et de Dong-Song sont entre vos mains avec d'immenses approvisionnements d'armes, de munitions et de vivres que votre élan n’a pas permis à l'ennemi d'emporter. Pendant les combats des 4, 5 et 6 février, qui vous ont rendus maîtres de ces admirables positions sur lesquelles l'armée chinoise avait compté pour nous barrer les débouchés du Deo-Van et du Deo-Quan et nous interdire les routes du Than-Moï et de Lang-Son, vous avez égalé les troupes les plus citées dans les annales de l'armée française. Vous avez ajouté une belle page à notre histoire nationale. Honneur à vos chefs et à vous! Vous approchez du terme de votre mission. Des combats, des privations et des fatigues vous attendent encore. Les vertus militaires, dont vous avez déjà donné tant de preuves, garantissent le succès de l'avenir.

(The formidable entrenched camps of Ha Hoa and Dong Song are in your hands, with their huge supplies of weapons, ammunition and provisions, which the speed of your attack prevented the enemy from carrying off. During the actions of 4, 5 and 6 February, which have made us masters of these admirable positions which the Chinese army had counted on to bar us from the passes of Deo Van and Deo Quan and to prevent us from reaching the routes to Thanh Moy and Lạng Sơn, you have matched the exploits of the troops most often cited in the annals of the French Army; you have added a fine page to our national history. Honour to your officers and to yourselves! You are approaching the end of your task. Battles, privations and fatigues still await you. But your military virtues, of which you have already given such sterling proofs, guarantee your future success.)

The second order of the day, issued on 14 February, marked the capture of Lạng Sơn:

Vous avez arboré le drapeau français sur Lang-Son. Une armée chinoise dix fois plus nombreuse que vous a dû repasser, entièrement en déroute, la frontière, laissant entre vos mains ses étendards, ses armes et ses munitions. Elle a été réduite à vous abandonner ou à disperser dans les montagnes le matériel européen sur lequel elle avait tant compté pour s’opposer à notre marche. Gloire à vous tous qui successivement vous êtes mesurés avec elle dans les combats du 4 à Thay-Hoa, du 5 à Ha-Hoa, du 6 à Dong-Song, du 9 à Deo-Quao, du 11 à Pho-Vy, du 12 à Bac-Viay, du 13 à Lang-Son, et l'avez chassée, malgré sa vigoureuse résistance, des positions formidables qu’elle occupait! Honneur aussi aux officiers chargés de la conduite des convois de vivres et de munitions! C’est grâce à leur dévouement et à leur infatigable énergie que vous avez pu vivre et que nos progrès n’ont pas été retardés plus longtemps.

(You have hoisted the French flag above Lạng Sơn. A Chinese army ten times your numbers has had to recross the frontier in complete rout, leaving in your hands its standards, its arms and its ammunition. It has been forced to abandon to you or to disperse in the mountains the European equipment on which it had so heavily relied to block our march. Glory to all of you who successfully measured yourselves with this army in the actions of the 4th at Tay Hoa, the 5th at Ha Hoa, the 6th at Dong Song, the 9th at Deo Quao, the 11th at Pho Vy, the 12th at Bac Vie and the 13th at Lạng Sơn, and chased it, despite its vigorous resistance, from the formidable positions which it occupied! Honour also to the officers charged with bringing up the food and ammunition trains. It is thanks to their devotion and indefatigable energy that you have been able to eat, and that our advances were not longer delayed.)

== French officers killed in action, Lạng Sơn campaign ==
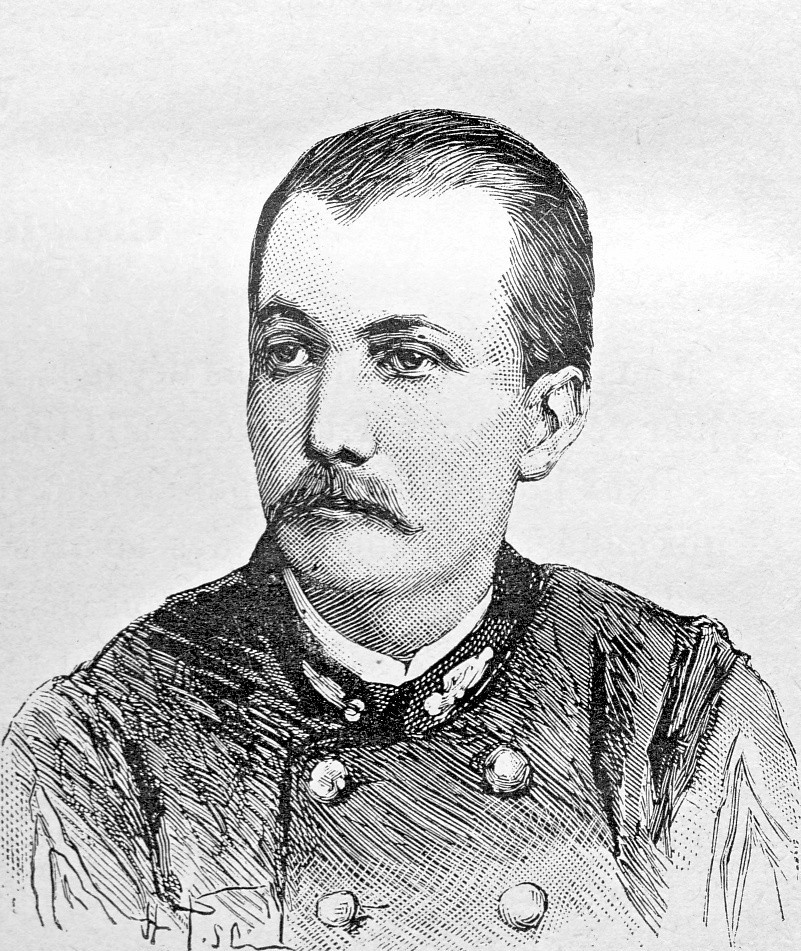
Captain Gravereau, 2nd Legion Battalion (Tay Hoa, 4 February 1885)

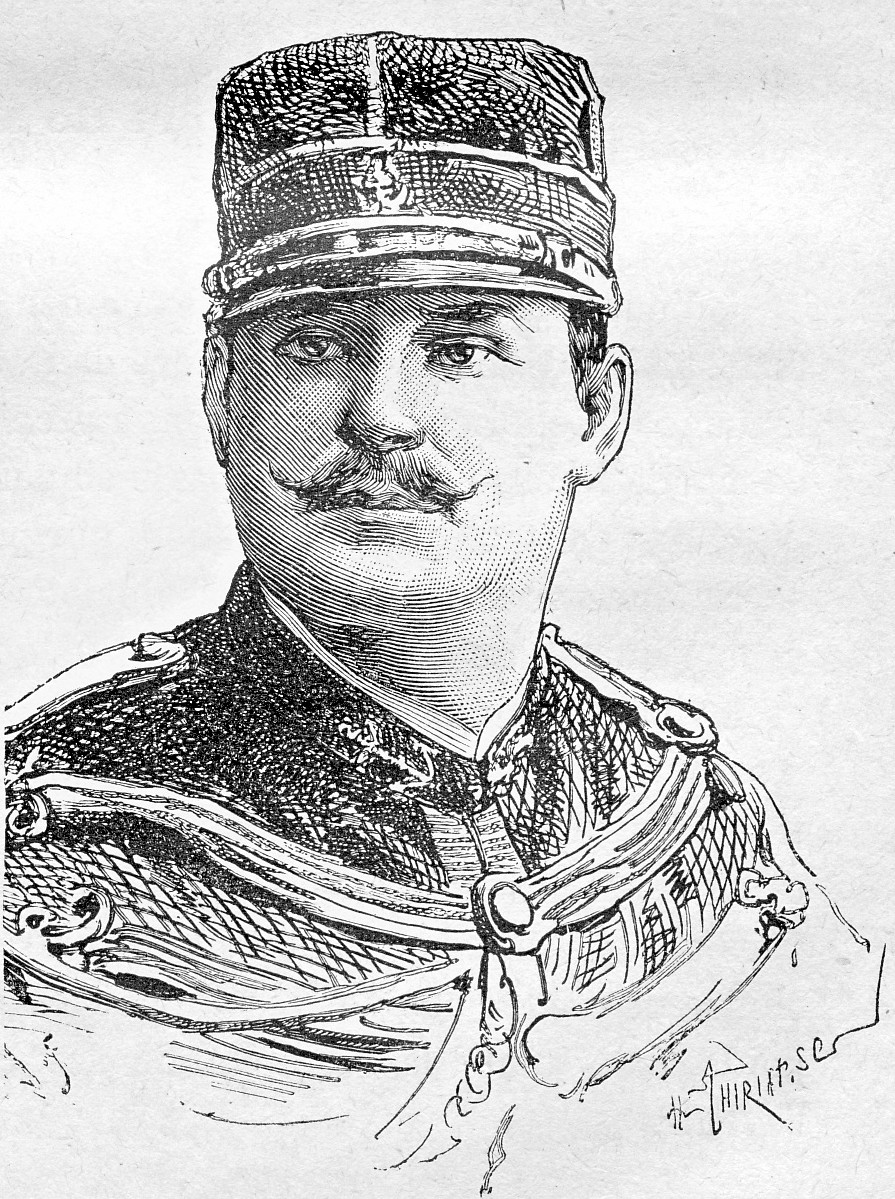
2nd Lieutenant Bossant, marine infantry (Bac Vie, 12 February 1885)

== Aftermath ==
=== Battle of Dong Dang, 23 February ===
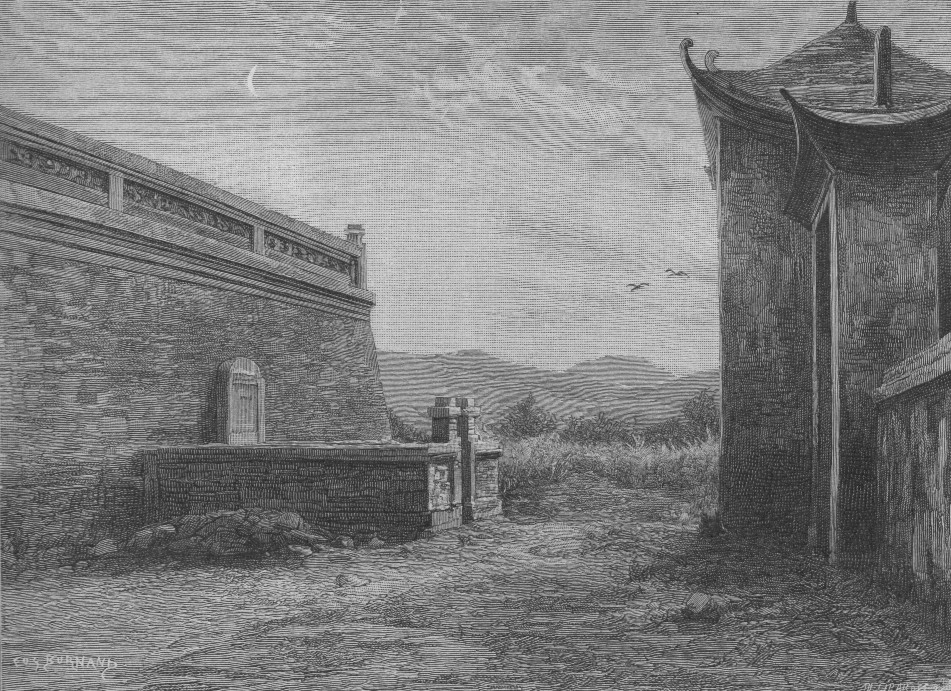
2nd Lieutenant Bossant's tomb in Lạng Sơn. Bossant was killed in action at Bac Vie, 12 February 1885

On 16 February Brière de l'Isle left Lạng Sơn with Giovanninelli's 1st Brigade to relieve the Siege of Tuyên Quang. Before his departure he ordered General de Négrier, who would remain at Lạng Sơn with the 2nd Brigade, to press on towards the Chinese border and expel the battered remnants of the Guangxi Army from Tonkinese soil. After resupplying the 2nd Brigade with food and ammunition, De Négrier advanced to attack the Guangxi Army at Dong Dang. On 23 February de Négrier stormed the Chinese defences at Dong Dang, forcing the Chinese to retreat towards the Chinese border town of Longzhou (Lung-chou, 龍州).

After clearing the Chinese from Tonkinese territory the French crossed briefly into Guangxi province and on 25 February blew up the 'Gate of China', an elaborate Chinese customs building on the border at Zhennan Pass (Zhennanguan). They were not strong enough to exploit this victory, however, and de Négrier returned to Lạng Sơn with the bulk of the 2nd Brigade at the end of February. A small French garrison under the command of Lieutenant-Colonel Herbinger was left at Dong Dang to watch the movements of the Guangxi Army. Three weeks later the Chinese attacked the Dong Dang garrison, precipitating a series of events that led to a decisive French defeat at the Battle of Bang Bo (24 March 1885).
