= Louis Brière de l'Isle =

French Army general

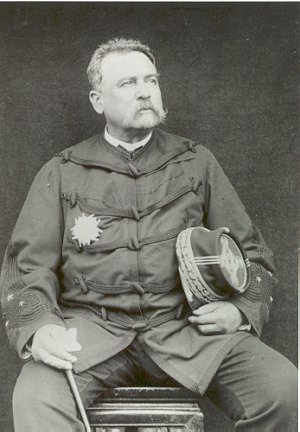
- General Briere de l'Isle, with the plaque of a Grand Officer of the Légion d'honneur on his chest
- Born: 24 June 1827; Martinique
- Died: 19 June 1896 (aged 68) Saint-Leu–Taverny, France
- Allegiance: France
- Branch: Marine Troops
- Service years: 1847–1893
- Rank: Général de division
- Commands: 1st Marine Infantry Regiment; Tonkin Expeditionary Corps
- Conflicts: Franco-Prussian War; Sino-French War
- Awards: Citation in L'Ordre de L'Armee (1861); Grand Officer of the Légion d'honneur
- Other work: Governor of Senegal

Louis Alexandre Esprit Gaston Brière de l'Isle (24 June 1827 – 19 June 1896) was a French Army general who achieved distinction firstly as Governor of Senegal (1876–81), and then as general-in-chief of the Tonkin Expeditionary Corps during the Sino-French War (August 1884–April 1885).

== Military career to 1871 ==
Louis Briere de l'Isle was born on 4 June 1827 in Martinique. In 1847 he graduated from Saint-Cyr and was made Sous lieutenant in the Troupes de marine, promoted to lieutenant in 1852 and captain in 1856. In the French colonial campaign in French Indochina, he was served as adjudant major du régiment de marine (1859–1860). Stationed in Cochinchina from 1861 to 1866. In 1861 he received a citation in the ordre de l'armée for combat at the February Battle of Kỳ Hòa, just west of Saigon.

Briere de l'Isle was made Chef d'escadron in 1862, and inspecteur des affaires indigènes at Tây Ninh in 1863.

At the outbreak of the Franco-Prussian War he was made Colonel, led the 1st Marine Infantry Regiment at the Battle of Bazeilles (for which he was made a Commandeur de la Légion d'honneur), and was wounded at the Battle of Sedan in 1870.

== Governor of Sénégal ==
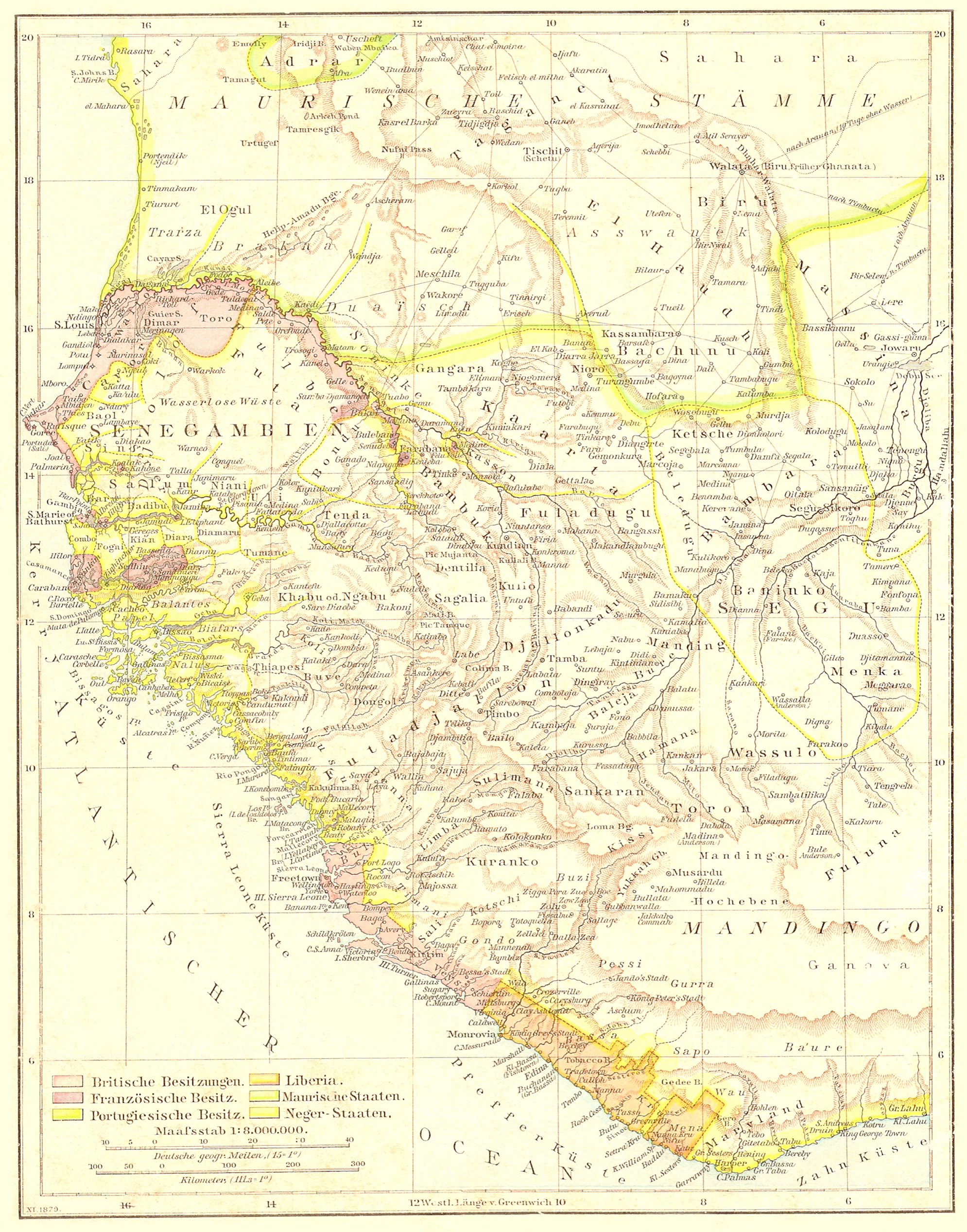
Senegambia in 1881, at the end of Briere de l'Isle's tenure. Areas in pink are annexed to the French Empire, while much of the surrounding territory are French "protectorates".

After the war, Brière de l'Isle was named Governor of Sénégal from 1876 to 1881. He took an important role in the French conquest of Senegal.

Kanya-Forstner describes him as "an authoritarian ruler who angered French commercial interests and turned the colony into a quasi-military dictatorship". Finding the colony in dire financial straits, he increased taxes on imported cloth from other countries, which went some way to placating the large French commercial houses while alienating local interests in Saint-Louis and Dakar. Militarily, the Senegal colony had recently faced both uprisings in the Wolof states which now make up the coastal heart of Senegal, and powerful states in the interior. The Minister of the Navy issued orders to Governor Brière de l'Isle that no new territory was to be annexed. Despite this he began a series of expansions through protectorates and direct military control, unprecedented since the highpoint of expansion under the governorship of Louis Faidherbe (1854–1865). Brière de l'Isle oversaw the conquest of French territory in West Africa which would be formalised at the Berlin Conference of 1884, beginning the so-called "Scramble for Africa".

=== Expansion into the Middle Niger ===
In April 1873 Brière de l'Isle, had sent Paul Soleillet to Ségou (now central Mali) to open negotiations with the ruler Ahmadu Tall, beginning French expansion into the Middle Niger River valley. In March 1880, he again sent envoys to Ségou, this time led by the future governor Joseph Gallieni to establish regular trade. In the process, Gallieni constructed the French fort at Bafoulabé. Soleillet had advocated in his reports for what was to become the Dakar-Niger Railway, linking Senegal to the middle Niger at Ségou. Brière de l'Isle was quickly won over, and found an ally in the new Minister of the Navy (to whom colonial officials reported), Admiral Jean Bernard Jauréguiberry, appointed February 1879. While Jauréguiberry failed to win sufficient government funding, and Gallieni's failure to build roads to Bafoulabé shook government resolve, the process of eastward expansion of direct territorial control had begun. Charles de Freycinet, Minister of Public Works supported the proposed railway, and in 1880, Jauréguiberry issued a decree that all work on the railway was to be carried out by the Troupes de Marine.

Brière de l'Isle was committed to expanding French control over the middle Niger River valley, but unlike many of his predecessors the French governments of the late 1870s were more willing to sanction (or accept) direct conquest of territory. Ironically the merchant houses based in Saint-Louis were in this period still hesitant about direct control of the hinterlands, preferring to work through their own trade networks and the series of French military trading posts. In this way as well, Brière de l'Isle was representative of the next stage in French colonialism.

=== Final pacification of Senegal ===
In 1876 and 1877, Brière de l'Isle saw to it that the last remaining Wolof leader who could offer a threat to the French, the already isolated Lat Dior, was blocked from any attempt to retake his lost territory, and consolidated French control over northwest Senegal. When Dior and his Cayor kingdom again rose in 1879, the French crushed them for the final time. This enabled Brière de l'Isle's government to go ahead with what had been Faidherbe's grand project: the construction of the Dakar-Saint-Louis railway through the rich groundnut cultivating regions of central Senegal. This provided transport, security, and access to a rich export crop that would be channeled through French merchant ports. In October 1877 Brière de l'Isle's began a campaign east and south along the Senegal River aimed at Abdul Bubakar's state in the northern Fouta Djallon highlands. Ignoring direct orders from Paris, he sent a force to attack Bubakar, forcing him to submit to a French protectorate over the provinces of Toro, Lao and Irlabé.

=== French Guinea ===
To the south (in what is today Guinea), he began a series of offensives in Rivières du Sud occupying positions near Benty in 1879 and seizing the islands of Kakoutlaye and Matakong. This, with the expansion in Fouta Djallon, laid the basis for the formal creation of Rivières du Sud colony in 1882.

=== Conflict with the Toucouleur Empire ===
In 1878 he sent another French force against the Kaarta Toucouleur vassal state along the north bank of the Senegal River. Again blocked by the colonial minister in Paris, he argued that they were a threat to the Senegalese kingdom of Futa Tooro (then a French client state) with which the British were poised to interfere. The Ministry, under Jauréguiberry, gave in and on 7 July 1878, a French force destroyed the Tokolor fort at Sabouciré, killing their leader, Almany Niamody. This portion of the Kaarta vassal state was then incorporated into the Khasso Wolof protectorate kingdom.

This marked the beginning of the conquest of the Toucouleur Empire by the French. While the Siege of Medina Fort in 1857 had helped persuade the empire's founder El Hadj Umar Tall to turn his attentions east of the Senegal River valley, the French had had little contact with the conquest state since then. This allowed first Faidherbe and then Brière de l'Isle a free hand in what is now Senegal. Brière de l'Isle's tenure marked not only the consolidation of French control of Senegal, but the next push to the east.

This same commitment to military expansion led to Brière de l'Isle dismissal when the political winds in Paris changed. Admiral Georges Charles Cloué was named Minister of the Navy in 1881, and the Governor was warned that expansion of the rail line to the Niger River was a low priority, to be pressed by civilian (business) interests only, removing the Marine involvement in its construction. Cloué ordered the governor to cease military operations pushing east of Kita. Within weeks Brière de l'Isle ordered his military protege Lieutenant Colonel Gustave Borgnis-Desbordes to launch a punitive expedition to the Niger and seize the small town at Bamako. Brière de l'Isle was recalled on 11 March 1881 in response. By the end of 1881 Senegal had its first civilian governor, Marie Auguste Deville de Perière.

=== Foundation for the conquest of French Soudan ===
While it fell to Borgnis-Desbordes, Joseph Gallieni and Louis Archinard to lead the conquest of the middle Niger region, Brière de l'Isle began the advance, and oversaw the creation of the military territory of "Upper Senegal" (Haut-Sénégal) region on 27 February 1880. This created the institutional conditions, just as Brière de l'Isle's flouting of government restrictions stoked the martial culture, for independent action and imperial expansion by officers in the field. One historian has written that the creation of Haut-Sénégal:

...marks the real beginning of the phase of French expansion in Africa christened "military imperialism" by Kanya-Forstner. For the next twenty years marine commanders, not government ministers, would determine the pace and extent of French expansion along the road to Timbuktu.

Giving its military commanders sufficient cover to act unilaterally (if unlawfully), this territory was quickly expanded through conquest to the east, and renamed French Sudan in 1890.

== Tonkin ==
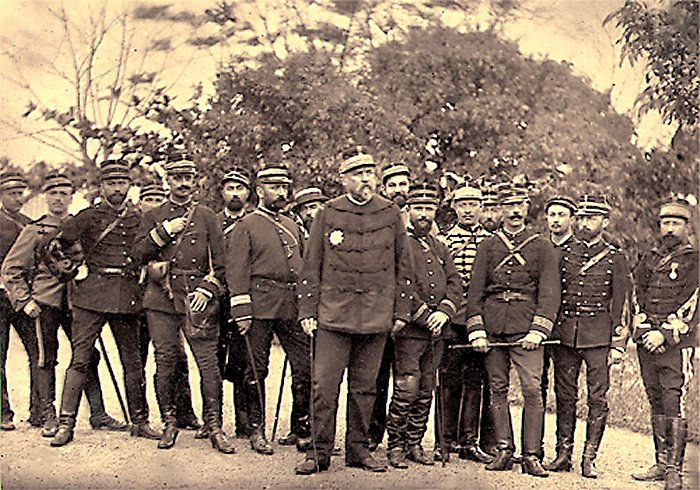
General Brière de l'Isle and his staff on the eve of the Lạng Sơn Campaign. General François de Négrier (with hand on chest) and Lieutenant-Colonel Paul-Gustave Herbinger (clasping cane in both hands) are in the front row.

Promoted brigadier (général de brigade) in 1881, Brière de l'Isle was given command of the 1st Brigade of the Tonkin Expeditionary Corps in February 1884, during the French expedition to Tonkin (now northern Vietnam). In March 1884 he drove the Chinese from the Trung Son heights and routed the right wing of the Guangxi Army in the Bắc Ninh campaign. In recognition of his services at Bắc Ninh, he was appointed a Grand Officier de la Légion d'honneur in April. In April 1884 he outflanked the defences of Hưng Hóa with the 1st Brigade while General François de Négrier's 2nd Brigade fixed them frontally, forcing Liu Yongfu to withdraw the Black Flag Army from the town before his men were cut off. Brière de l'Isle's flank march at Hưng Hóa enabled the French to occupy the most heavily fortified Black Flag stronghold in Tonkin without losing a man.

In September 1884, shortly after the outbreak of the Sino-French War (August 1884 to April 1885), he replaced General Charles-Théodore Millot as general-in-chief of the Tonkin Expeditionary Corps. In October 1884 he defeated a major Chinese invasion of the Tonkin Delta in the Kep Campaign. In January 1885 he was promoted divisional general (général de division). In February 1885 he commanded both brigades of the Tonkin Expeditionary Corps in the Lạng Sơn Campaign, defeating China's Guangxi Army and capturing the strategically important border town of Lạng Sơn. This campaign, which required months of patient preparation, was perhaps the greatest military achievement of his career. Immediately after the capture of Lạng Sơn he returned to Hanoi with Lieutenant-Colonel Laurent Giovanninelli's 1st Brigade to relieve the Siege of Tuyên Quang, leaving General François de Négrier's 2nd Brigade at Lạng Sơn. After defeating Liu Yongfu's Black Flag Army at the Battle of Hòa Mộc (2 March 1885), Brière de l'Isle entered the beleaguered French post in triumph on 3 March. These battlefield successes underscored the failure of concurrent diplomatic attempts to resolve the conflict between France and China, and evoked a heartfelt tribute from the French premier Jules Ferry: 'It seems that the only negotiator China will respect is General Brière de l'Isle.'

Brière de l'Isle's record of substantial military achievement was marred at the end of March 1885 by the controversial Retreat from Lạng Sơn. The retreat, which threw away the gains of the February Lạng Sơn Campaign, was ordered by Lieutenant-Colonel Paul Gustave Herbinger, the acting commander of the 2nd Brigade, and came less than a week after General de Négrier's defeat at the Battle of Bang Bo (24 March 1885). Brière de l'Isle was in Hanoi at the time, and was planning to shift his headquarters to Hưng Hóa, to supervise a planned offensive against the Yunnan Army around Tuyên Quang. Without waiting to sift the misleading information contained in Herbinger's alarmist cables from Lạng Sơn, Brière de l'Isle fired off a pessimistic telegram on the evening of 28 March to the French government, warning that the Tonkin Expeditionary Corps faced disaster unless it was immediately reinforced. This cable, immediately dubbed the 'Lạng Sơn telegram', brought down Jules Ferry's government on 30 March 1885, ruined Ferry's political career, and dealt a severe blow to domestic support for French colonial expansion (see Tonkin Affair). It also cast a shadow over Brière de l'Isle's professional reputation. Although he was to obtain further professional advancement before his retirement, he knew that he would in future be remembered not as the French commander who had captured Lạng Sơn and relieved Tuyên Quang but as the man who had lost his head and sent the notorious telegram that had brought down Ferry's administration.

In May 1885, in consequence of its expansion into a two-division army corps, Brière de l'Isle was replaced in command of the Tonkin Expeditionary Corps by General Henri Roussel de Courcy. He was offered command of the 1st Division of the expanded expeditionary corps, and accepted only on condition that General François de Négrier was given command of the 2nd Division. The army ministry granted this request, and Brière de l'Isle served under de Courcy's command for several months. De Courcy was an arrogant and obtuse commander, unwilling to listen to advice from his more experienced juniors, and relations between the two men soon plummeted. Brière de l'Isle disagreed with de Courcy's unimaginative pacification strategy in Tonkin and his failure to take effective quarantine measures to deal with a cholera outbreak in August 1885. In October 1885, with Annam and Tonkin in open insurrection against French rule and the Tonkin Expeditionary Corps decimated by cholera, he decided that he had had enough. Unable to stomach working for de Courcy any longer, he left Tonkin and returned to France.

== Final years ==
Brière de l'Isle was appointed Adjutant Inspector General of Marine Infantry from 1888 to 1891, then Inspector General from 1892 to 1893. He died on 19 June 1896, Saint-Leu–Taverny, Seine-et-Oise Department (now in Val-d'Oise Department), France.

== Commemoration ==
- There is a Rue Brière de l'Isle in Toulon, the site of a major naval base in southern France.
- While a Rue Brière de l'Isle remains in central Dakar, the Rue Brière de l'Isle in Saint-Louis has been renamed Rue Abdoulaye Seck.
- Prior to independence, the Avenue Brière de l'Isle ran by the Colonial Governors Place in central Hanoi, Vietnam.
- Barracks of the 5eme Régiment Interarmes d'Outre-Mer in Djibouti are named Quartier Brière de l'Isle.
- In colonial Indochina, a major French base in Hanoi was named fort Brière-de-l'Isle. It was taken by the Japanese from Franco-Vietnamese colonial forces in a bloody battle on 9 March 1945.

== Offices held ==
Government offices
Preceded by François-Xavier Michel Valière	Governor of Sénégal; 18 June 1876–11 March 1880	Succeeded by Louis Ferdinand de Lanneau
