= Pan Dingxin =

Chinese Qing dynasty governor and military commander (1828–1888)

Pan Dingxin (Chinese: 潘鼎新; Wade–Giles: P'an Ting-hsin; 1828–1888) was a Qing dynasty governor and military commander of the Huai Army, best known for his role in the Sino-French War.

== Early life ==
Pan was born in Lujiang, Anhui Province. He began his education with his father Pan Xiao'an, a teacher. One of his classmate was Liu Bingzhang. He passed the county exam (考秀) and then the provincial exam, obtaining the juren (Chinese: 举人) degree in 1849.

== Career ==
He edited biographies at the Guoshiguan, National History Bureau (国史馆). When the Taiping Rebellion broke out, he ran militia and eventually had his own army, the Ding Battalion (Chinese: "鼎"字营; also Ting-tzu-ying). He was a commander in the civil wars against the Taiping Rebellion and the Nian Rebellion. He served as governor of Shandong in 1865, Yunnan in 1876 and Guangxi in 1884., He was most noted for his role during the Sino-French War: Battle of Đồng Đăng, Battle of Bang Bo (Zhennan Pass), Kep Campaign.

== Movie ==
Pan Dingxin is at the center of the movie The War of Loong (2017)
