= Charles-Théodore Millot =

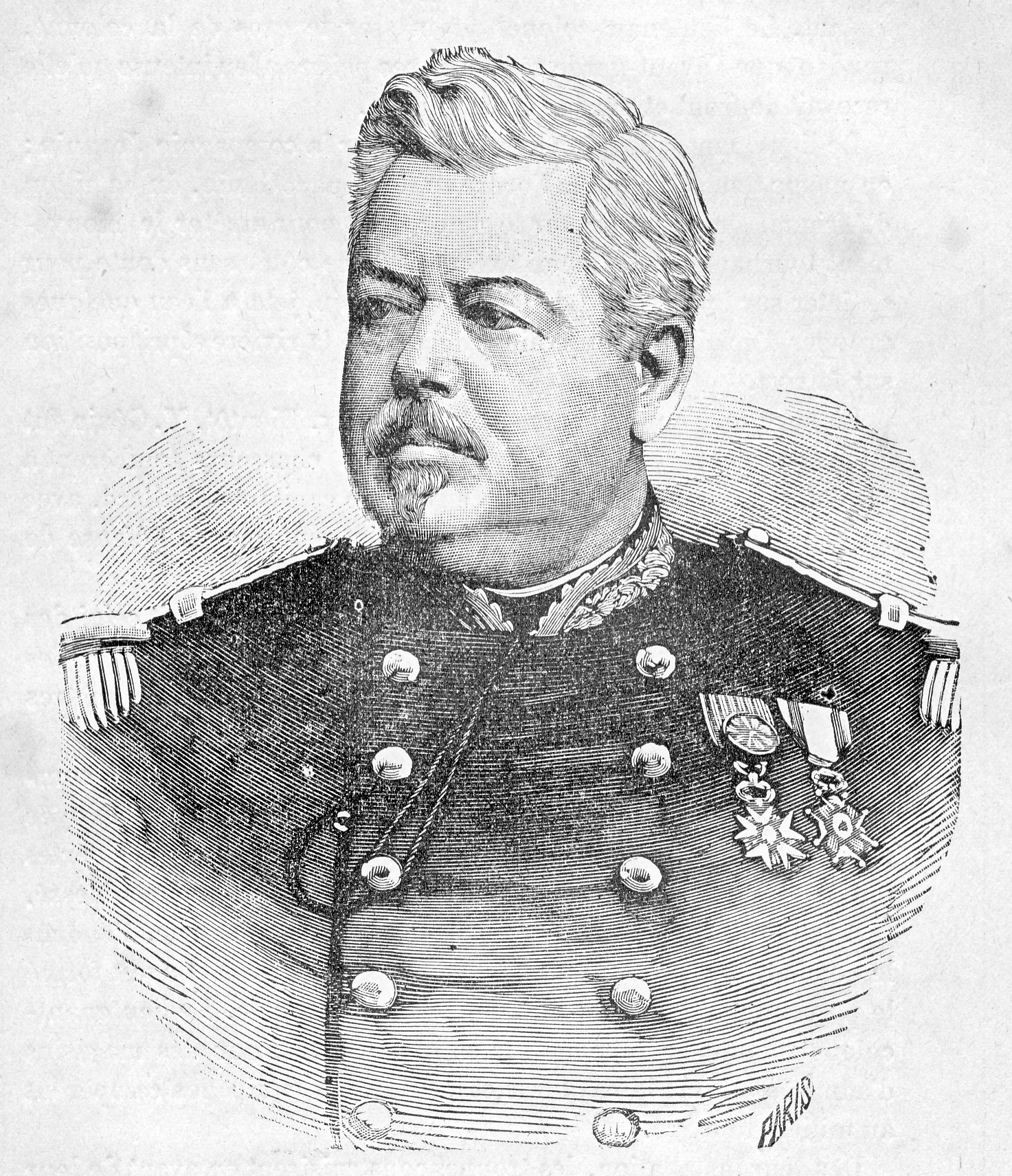
- Nickname: Toi Toi ("Stop!")
- Born: 28 June 1829; Montigny-sur-Aube
- Died: 17 May 1889 (aged 59) Angoulême
- Allegiance: France
- Branch: French Army
- Service years: 1847–1884
- Rank: Général de division
- Commands: Tonkin Expeditionary Corps (1884)
- Conflicts: Franco-Prussian War; Tonkin campaign

Charles-Théodore Millot (28 June 1829 – 17 May 1889) was a French general who distinguished himself in the Franco-Prussian War (1870–1871) and the Tonkin Campaign (1883–1886). His victories at Bắc Ninh (March 1884) and Hưng Hóa brought to an end the two-year undeclared war in northern Vietnam between France and China, and paved the way for the conclusion of the Tientsin Accord between the two countries on 11 May 1884. Millot resigned as general-in-chief of the Tonkin Expeditionary Corps shortly after the outbreak of the Sino-French War on 23 August 1884 and returned to France.

== Command of Tonkin Expeditionary Corps ==
In early 1884 the arrival of substantial reinforcements from France and the African colonies raised the strength of the expeditionary corps to over 10,000 men. Its new commander, général de division Charles-Théodore Millot (1829–1889), organised this force into two brigades. The 1st Brigade was commanded by général de brigade Louis Brière de l'Isle (1827–1896), who had earlier made his reputation as governor of Senegal. The 2nd Brigade was commanded by général de brigade François de Négrier (1842–1913), a charismatic young Foreign Legion commander who had recently quelled a serious Arab rebellion in Algeria.

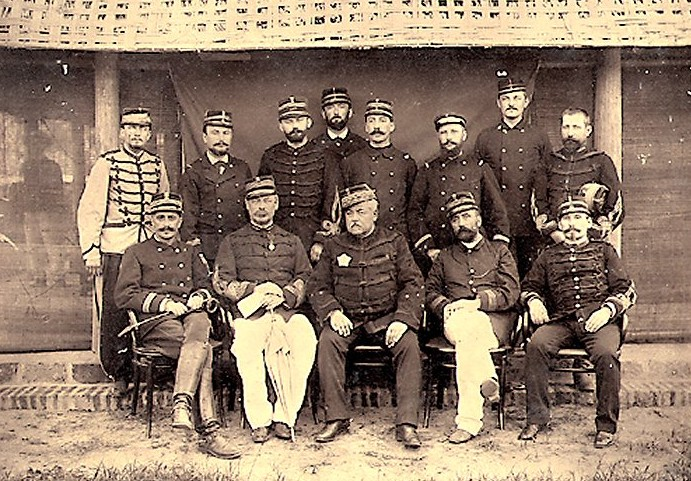
General Millot and his staff, summer 1884. The charismatic young general François de Négrier is sitting second to Millot's right

Millot commanded the expeditionary corps for eight months, from February to September 1884. During his tenure of command he organised two major campaigns to capture Bắc Ninh and Hưng Hóa (March and April 1884) and two more modest expeditions to capture Thái Nguyên and Tuyên Quang (May and June 1884). In the Bắc Ninh campaign he won a spectacular walkover victory against Xu Yanxu's Guangxi Army. At the Capture of Hưng Hóa, he flanked Liu Yongfu out of a formidable defensive system without losing a man. Having argued strenuously against sending a column to occupy Lạng Sơn in the heat of the Tonkin summer, he emerged unscathed from the official enquiry into the circumstances of the Bắc Lệ ambush (June 1884).

Millot was arguably the most successful of the many commanders of the expeditionary corps, but he was unpopular with both his officers and his men, who considered him overcautious. Significantly, his decision to halt General de Négrier's pursuit of the defeated Chinese forces in the Bắc Ninh campaign was held against him, even though he had sound military reasons for this decision. The troops immediately gave sardonic Vietnamese nicknames to their three generals. The much-admired de Négrier became Maolen ('Quick!'), Brière de l'Isle Mann Mann ('Slow!'), and Millot Toi Toi ('Stop!').

Millot's career in Tonkin ended on a sour note. In poor health, and dismayed at the way the French government used the Bắc Lệ ambush as a pretext for war with China, he submitted his resignation in September 1884. In his last order of the day, he described himself as 'a sick and disappointed man'.
