= Treaty of Tianjin (1885) =

Treaty which ended the Sino-French War

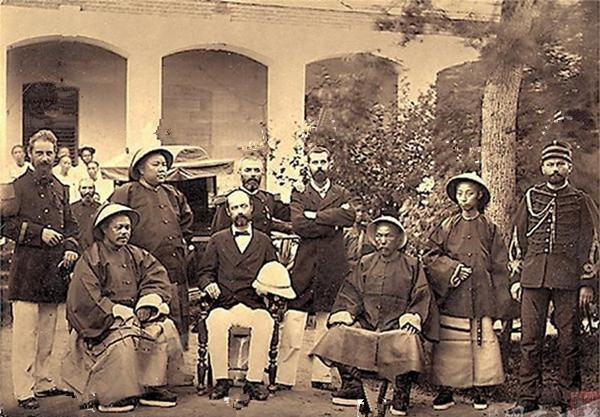
Li Hongzhang and Jules Patenotre after signing the treaty

Treaty of Tianjin (Chinese: 中法新約), signed on June 9, 1885, officially ended the Sino-French War. The "unequal treaty", or colonial treaty, restated in greater detail the main provisions of the Tianjin Accord, signed between France and China on May 11, 1884. As Article 2 required China to recognize the French protectorate over Annam and Tonkin established by the Treaty of Hue in June 1884, implicitly forcing China to abandon its claims to suzerainty over Vietnam, the treaty formalized France's diplomatic victory in the Sino-French War.

== Background ==
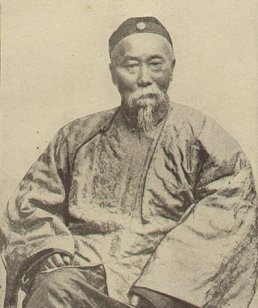
Li Hongzhang

In December 1884, alarmed by Japanese ambitions in Korea, Empress Dowager Cixi ordered her ministers to extricate China from the undeclared war with France that had broken out on 23 August. Key French victories in Tonkin and Formosa in February and early March 1885, respectively strengthened her desire to end the Sino-French War. Although the Chinese won an unexpected victory in Tonkin in late March, defeating General de Négrier's 2nd Brigade at Bang Bo and reoccupying Lạng Sơn, this success was counterbalanced by the simultaneous French capture of the Pescadores Islands. Despite the fall of Jules Ferry's ministry in France at the end of March in the wake of the retreat from Lạng Sơn, China's position in early April 1885 was critical. Thus, seizing the opportunity offered by the fall of the Ferry ministry, the Chinese agreed to implement the provisions of the May 1884 Tianjin Accord, which recognized France's protectorate over Vietnam. In return, the French dropped their longstanding demand for an indemnity for the Bắc Lệ ambush. After a flurry of negotiations in Paris in the first days of April 1885, peace was made on this basis.

Preliminaries of peace between France and China were signed on 4 April 1885. The preliminary peace protocol provided for an immediate ceasefire in both Tonkin and Formosa. The French agreed to lift their blockade of Formosa immediately, and the Chinese agreed to withdraw their armies from Tonkin by the end of May 1885. As a surety for Chinese good faith, the French maintained their 'rice blockade' of the Yangtze River and the Chinese ports of Ningbo and Beihai while continuing to occupy both Keelung and the Pescadores Islands.

The Chinese carefully observed the terms of the peace settlement; thus, both the Yunnan and Guangxi Army withdrew from Tonkin. Recognizing the practical difficulties faced by Tang Jingsong's Yunnan Army, located deep in Tonkinese territory around Hưng Hóa, the French extended the April 4th deadline specified in the accord for its withdrawal, and the Yunnan Army finally returned to China via Lào Cai on June 2, 1885. Under pressure from Chinese commanders, Liu Yongfu's Black Flag Army also withdrew from Tonkinese territory. Satisfied that China intended to honor its obligations, the French government consented to the conclusion of a definitive peace treaty between France and China.

A comprehensive peace treaty in ten articles, based on the provisions of the Tianjin Accord of May 11, 1884, was signed at Tianjin on June 9, 1885, by Li Hongzhang on behalf of China and by Jules Patenôtre on behalf of France. Li had been widely criticized in China for too many concessions to France. Conservative officials prevented the provisions of the Tianjin Accord from being put into effect, resulting in a clash between French and Chinese troops at Bắc Lệ in Tonkin. This confrontation had led directly to the outbreak of the Sino-French War on 23 August 1884. Although the hardline elements in the Qing court were unable to prevent the empress dowager from again appointing Li Hongzhang to negotiate a peace treaty with the French, they insisted that Li was accompanied by two members of the Zongli Yamen, Xi Zhen and Deng Chengxiu. Deng was a prominent member of the hardline Purist party and his appointment, a deliberate insult to Li Hongzhang, was one of the last occasions on which the Purists were able to influence court policy. Discredited by China's defeat in the Sino-French War, the Purists rapidly lost influence at court thereafter.

== Text of the treaty (English translation) ==
Treaty of Peace, Friendship and Commerce, concluded between France and China at Tianjin on 9 June 1885

The President of the French Republic and His Majesty the Emperor of China, animated, the one and the other, by an equal desire to put an end to the difficulties they have given each other by their simultaneous interventions in the affairs of Annam, and wishing to reestablish and ameliorate the former relations of friendship and commerce which existed between France and China, have resolved to conclude a new treaty responding to the common interests of the two nations, based on the Preliminary Convention signed at Tianjin, 11 May 1884, and ratified by imperial Decree, 13 April 1885.

To that effect, the two High Contracting Parties have designated their plenipotentiaries, to wit: the President of the French Republic: M. JULES PATENÔTRE, Envoy Extraordinary and Minister Plenipotentiary of France in China, Officer of the Légion d'Honneur, Grand-Cross of the Polar Star of Sweden, etc; and His Majesty the Emperor of China: LI HONGZHANG, Imperial Commissioner, First Grand Secretary of State, Tutor of the Heir Presumptive, Superintendent of Trade of the Northern Ports, Viceroy of Zhili, holder of the First Degree of the Third Rank of Nobility, with the title Souyi; assisted by XI ZHEN, Imperial Commissioner, Member of the Council of Foreign Affairs, President of the Ministry of Justice, Administrator of the Treasure of the Ministry of Finances, Director of the Schools for the Education of the Hereditary Officers of the Left Wing of the Tartar Army of Beijing, Commander-in-Chief of the Chinese Contingent of the Yellow Bordered Banner; and DENG CHENGXI, Imperial Commissioner, Member of the Ceremonial Estate; who, after communicating to each other their plenipotentiary powers, which they have recognized as in good and due form, are agreed on the following Articles.

ARTICLE ONE

France engages herself to reestablish and maintain order in the provinces of Annam which border upon the Chinese Empire. To that effect, she will take the measures necessary to disperse or expel the bands of pillagers and vagabonds which compromise the public tranquility, thus preventing it from reforming itself. Nevertheless, French troops will not cross the frontier which separates Tonkin from China, a frontier which France promises to respect and guarantee against all aggression.

On her side, China engages herself to disperse or expel the bands which take refuge in her provinces bordering on Tonkin, and to disperse those which seek to organize themselves on her territory in order to spread trouble among the populations placed under the protection of France, and in consideration of the guarantees which have been accorded to her for the security of her frontier, she categorically pledges not to send troops to Tonkin.

The High Contracting Parties will fix by a special convention the conditions under which wrongdoers will be extradited between China and Annam. Chinese colonists or former soldiers who live peaceably in Annam, earning their living by agriculture, industry or commerce and whose conduct is above reproach, shall enjoy the same security for their persons and their goods as French protégés.

ARTICLE TWO

China, having decided to do nothing which could compromise the work of pacification undertaken by France, engages herself to respect, in the present and in the future, the treaties, conventions and arrangements directly concluded or to be concluded between France and Annam.

In those things which concern the relationships between China and Annam, it is intended that they will be of a nature such as not to affront the dignity of the Chinese Empire, and not to lead to any violation of the present treaty.

ARTICLE THREE

After an interval of six months from the signature of the present treaty, commissioners designated by the High Contracting Parties will go to delineate the frontier between China and Tonkin. They will place, wherever there is need, boundary markers designed to clearly delineate the line of demarcation. In the case where they can not agree among themselves on the placement of the markers or on the rectifications of detail in the actual frontier of Tonkin which it may be necessary to make in the common interest of both parties, they will refer it to their respective governments.

ARTICLE FOUR

When the frontier has been identified, the French, French protégés and foreign inhabitants of Tonkin who wish to cross it in order to go to China will only be allowed to do so after having previously furnished themselves with passports delivered by Chinese authorities at the frontier on the request of the French authorities. For Chinese subjects, an authorization by the imperial Frontier Authorities will suffice.

Chinese subjects who wish to travel from China to Tonkin, by the land route, must be provided with regular passports by the French authorities on request by the Imperial Authorities.

ARTICLE FIVE

Import and export trade will be permitted to French merchants or French protégés and to Chinese merchants on the land frontier between China and Tonkin. It must be carried out, however, at certain points which will be determined later and the choice as well as the number will be in agreement with the direction of flow as well as the importance of the traffic of the two countries. The regulations in force in the interior of the Chinese Empire will be taken into account in this respect.

Two trading posts will be designated on the Chinese frontier, one above Lào Cai and the other above Lạng Sơn. French merchants may establish themselves there under the same conditions and with the same advantages as in the treaty ports. The Government of His Majesty the Emperor of China will set up customs posts there, and the Government of the Republic will be able to maintain consuls there with the same privileges and prerogatives accorded to similar agents in the treaty ports.

His Majesty the Emperor of China may appoint consuls in the principal towns of Tonkin, subject to the agreement of the French Government.

ARTICLE SIX

A special regulation, annexed to the present treaty, will specify the conditions in which will be carried out the land commerce between Tonkin and the Chinese provinces of Yunnan, Guangxi and Guangdong. That regulation will be prepared by commissioners who will be named by the High Contracting Parties within three months of the signing of the present treaty.

The merchandise which will be the object of this commerce will be subject to, on entering and leaving Tonkin and the provinces of Yunnan and Guangxi, the same duties as those stipulated for foreign commerce. However, the reduced tariff will not be applied to merchandise transported across the land frontier between Tonkin and Guangdong and will not have effect in the ports opened by the treaties.

Trade in arms, machinery, provisions and munitions of war of all kinds will be subject to the laws and regulations laid down by each of the contracting states on its territory.

The export and import of opium will be regulated by special arrangements which will be part of the above mentioned commercial regulations.

The sea trade between China and Annam will be equally the object of a special regulation, provided that it contains no deviations from common practice.

ARTICLE SEVEN

In view of the development of conditions advantageous for commercial relations and neighbourliness which the present treaty has for its object to reestablish between France and China, the Government of the Republic will construct roads in Tonkin and will encourage the construction of railways there.

When, on her side, China decides to construct railway tracks, it is intended that she will address herself to French industry, and the Government of the Republic will provide her with every facility for the procurement in France of the personnel that she needs. It is also intended that this clause will not be considered as constituting an exclusive privilege in favor of France.

ARTICLE EIGHT

The commercial stipulations of the present treaty and the regulations arising from them can be revised after an interval of ten years has elapsed, dating from the exchange of ratifications of the present treaty. But, in the case where, six months before the appointed time, neither one nor the other of the High Contracting Parties has manifested a desire to proceed with revision, the commercial stipulations will remain in force for a new period of ten years and so forth.

ARTICLE NINE

After the present treaty has been signed, French forces will receive the order to retire from Keelung and to cease visitation, etc., on the high seas. Within one month after the signature of the present treaty, the Island of Formosa and the Pescadores will be entirely evacuated by French troops.

ARTICLE TEN

The provisions of older treaties, accords and conventions between France and China, not modified by the present treaty, remain in full force.

The present treaty will be ratified first by His Majesty the Emperor of China, and after that it will be ratified by the President of the French Republic, the exchange of ratifications to take place at Beijing after the shortest possible delay.

Done at Tianjin in four examples, 9 June 1885, corresponding to the 27th day of the fourth month of the eleventh year of Guangxu.

== Restoration of diplomatic relations ==
The signing of the treaty on 9 June was followed by a banquet at which the two plenipotentiaries expressed their satisfaction with the results of the negotiations. Patenôtre spoke as follows:

I have every confidence that the diplomatic agreement we have just signed will do more than just put an end to our past disputes and—I hope—speedily efface them from our memory. By creating new links between France and China, by opening new markets for the commercial activity of all nations, the Treaty of 9 June will indubitably help to entrench and develop between the Chinese Empire and foreign countries that community of interests which has always most effectively cemented friendships between peoples. If the imperial government holds the same sentiments in this respect as the government of the Republic, this treaty will confer real and lasting benefits on everyone.

Li Hongzhang made the following reply:

We Chinese have a saying: 'Friendship shines as brightly as the sun.' This proverb applies particularly to the bonds that link two great countries. China also desires the general welfare and wellbeing. From now on, the friendship between our two countries will shine as brightly as the morning sun when it emerges from the gloom of night.

== Implementation of the treaty ==
French cavalry troopers prepare to reoccupy Lạng Sơn, October 1885

On 10 June 1885, immediately after the signature of the peace treaty, the French lifted their naval blockade of the Yangtze River, Ningbo, and Beihai. They evacuated Keelung on 21 June 1885 and the Pescadores Islands on 22 July 1885.

Ratifications of the Treaty of Tianjin were exchanged at Beijing on 28 November 1885.

Article 3 of the treaty provided for the appointment of a Sino-French commission to demarcate the border between Tonkin and China, which largely forms today's China-Vietnam border. China's commissioners were Zhou Derun and Deng Chengxiu. The French commission was led by M. Bourcier Saint-Chaffray, and its members included M. Scherzer, the French consul in Canton, Dr Paul Neis, a noted Indochina explorer, Lieutenant-Colonel Tisseyre, Captain Bouinais, and M. Pallu de la Barrière (though the latter took no part in the commission's work). In preparation for the commission's work General de Courcy dispatched French troops to occupy Lạng Sơn, That Khe and other border towns in October 1885.

Demarcation work began in late 1885 and was completed in 1887. The French rejected Chinese claims to the Vietnamese town of Đồng Đăng, close to the Guangxi border and the site of a French victory during the Sino-French War, but agreed that the Bailong peninsula on the western border of Guangdong province should be awarded to China. A dispute over two areas on the border between Yunnan province and Tonkin was settled by the award of Mengsuo and Menglai (猛賴) to Vietnam, and the transfer of a large tract of fertile arable land between Mabaiguan (馬白關) and Nandan Mountain (南丹山) to China. An agreement confirming the new border between Vietnam and China was signed in Beijing on 26 June 1887 by French and Chinese representatives.

== Significance ==
The peace treaty of June 9, 1885 formalized France's diplomatic victory in the Sino-French War. Although the French were obliged to evacuate Keelung and the Penghu Islands (which Admiral Courbet had wanted to retain as a French counterweight to the British colony of Hong Kong), the Chinese withdrawal from Tonkin left the way clear for the French to reoccupy Lạng Sơn and to advance up the Red River to Lào Cai on the Yunnan-Tonkin border. In the years that followed the French crushed a vigorous Vietnamese resistance movement while consolidating their hold on Annam and Tonkin.

In 1887, Cochinchina, Annam and Tonkin (the territories which comprise the modern state of Vietnam) and Cambodia were incorporated into French Indochina. They were joined a few years later by Laos, ceded to France by Siam at the conclusion of the Franco-Siamese conflict of 1893.

== See also ==
- Unequal treaties
- Imperialism in Asia
