= Citadel of Hưng Hóa =

Historical settlement in Northern Vietnam

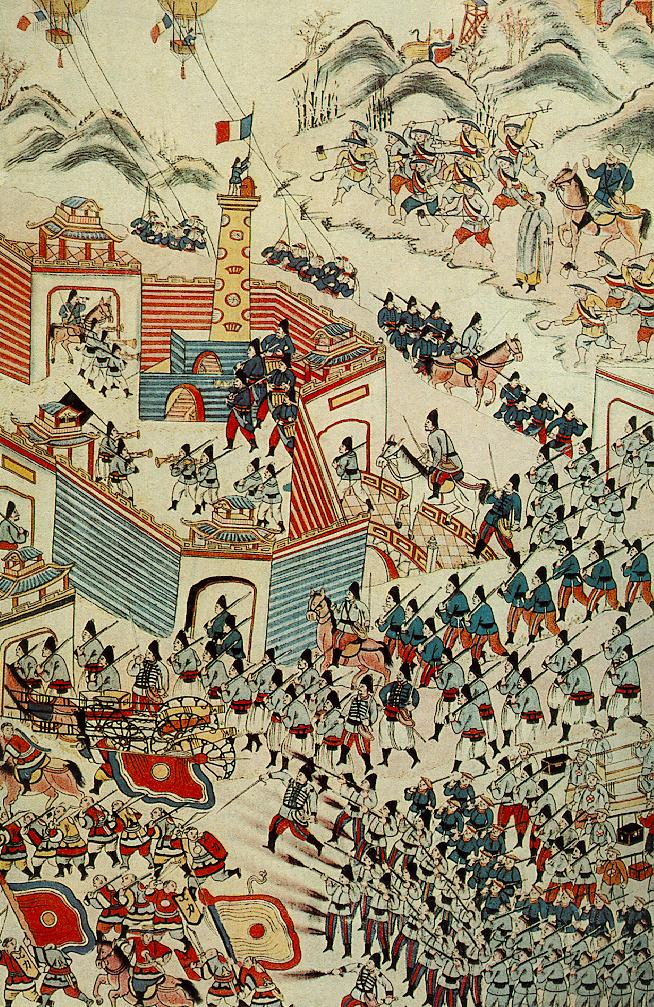

Thành Hưng Hóa was a fort and settlement in present-day Phú Thọ Province, northern Vietnam. The capture of Hưng Hóa in 1884 was an important French victory in the Tonkin Campaign.
