= Alphonse Dugenne =

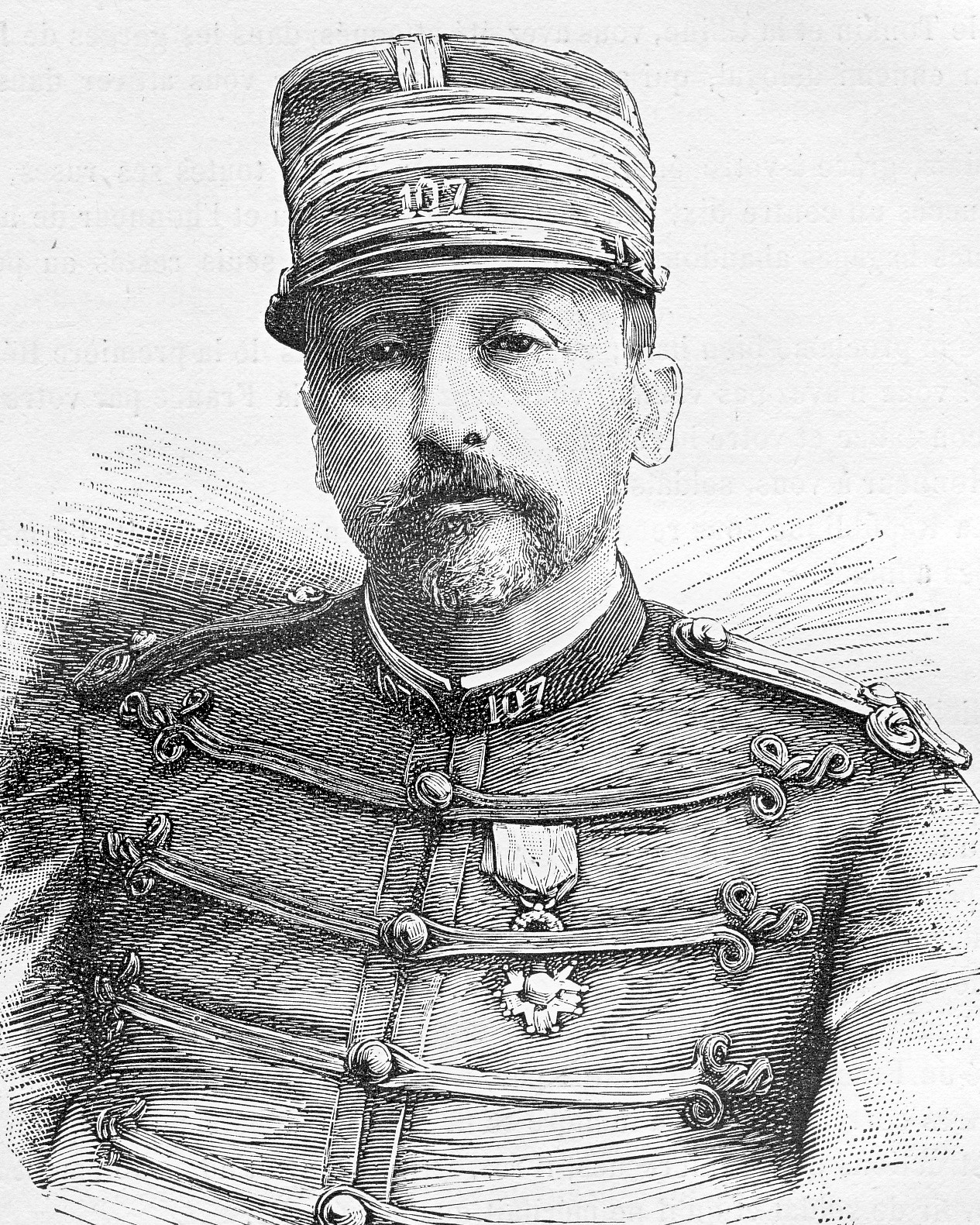
- Born: February 10, 1841; Pau, Pyrénées-Atlantiques, France
- Died: December 20, 1887 (aged 46); Phủ Lạng Thương, Tonkin, French Indochina
- Education: École spéciale militaire de Saint-Cyr
- Military career
- Allegiance: Second French Empire; French Third Republic
- Branch: French Army
- Service years: 1859 – 1887
- Rank: Colonel
- Conflicts: Second French intervention in Mexico; Franco-Prussian War; Tonkin Campaign: Bắc Lệ ambush

Alphonse Jules Alexandre Dugenne (1841–1887) was a French colonel who led the Bắc Lệ ambush during the Tonkin campaign as part of the French effort to capture the territory that would become French Indochina. He was later decorated as Officer and Knight of the Legion of Honour.

== Biography ==
Alphonse was born on February 10, 1841, in the Basses-Pyrénées department as the son of Alexandre-Louis Dugenne, the editor of the Mémorial des Pyrénées, and was the great-grandson of Elie-François Dugenne.

He entered the Saint Cyr military academy (École spéciale militaire de Saint-Cyr) in 1859 and subsequently began his military career.

Dugenne was appointed corporal in October 1860, second lieutenant of the 2nd Foreign Regiment in October 1861, and lieutenant in October 1866. On April 10, 1867, he was moved to the 81st Infantry Regiment. He was promoted to captain in March 1870, and served from November 20, 1870, in the 52nd Infantry Regiment. On December 18, he became senior battalion commander of the Garde mobile de la Haute-Loire, moved to the 21st Provisional Regiment on April 13, 1871, and was laid off by redundancy on May 29, 1871. Appointed Captain on November 31, 1871, he served from April 22, 1872, at 64th Infantry Regiment and then from February 17, 1873, as part of the 1st Foreign Regiment. He was promoted to Battalion commander on November 28, 1878, in the 19th Infantry Regiment, then moved to the 2nd Zouaves Regiment on June 14, 1879, and was appointed Battalion Commander of the 1st Battalion of Chasseurs of Pied on August 22, 1882.

He was later appointed to the 2nd African Light Infantry Battalion on May 22, 1884, arriving in Tonkin (modern Vietnam) later that year. At the beginning of June, he inflicted losses to the bands of pirates that were meandering around the Dong Trien. As a result of those actions, he received four wounds in Hong-Hoa. A year after arriving in Vietnam, on March 29, 1885, he became Lieutenant Colonel in the 107th Infantry Regiment. He rose through the ranks and then on February 6, 1886, he was appointed Lieutenant Colonel in the 11th Infantry Regiment and on February 10, 1886, in the 51st Infantry Regiment. On February 10, 1886, he served in the 11th Infantry Regiment, then on July 1, 1887, he was finally appointed Colonel in the 17th Infantry Regiment, and later on transferred to the 88th Infantry Regiment.

=== Bắc Lệ Ambush ===
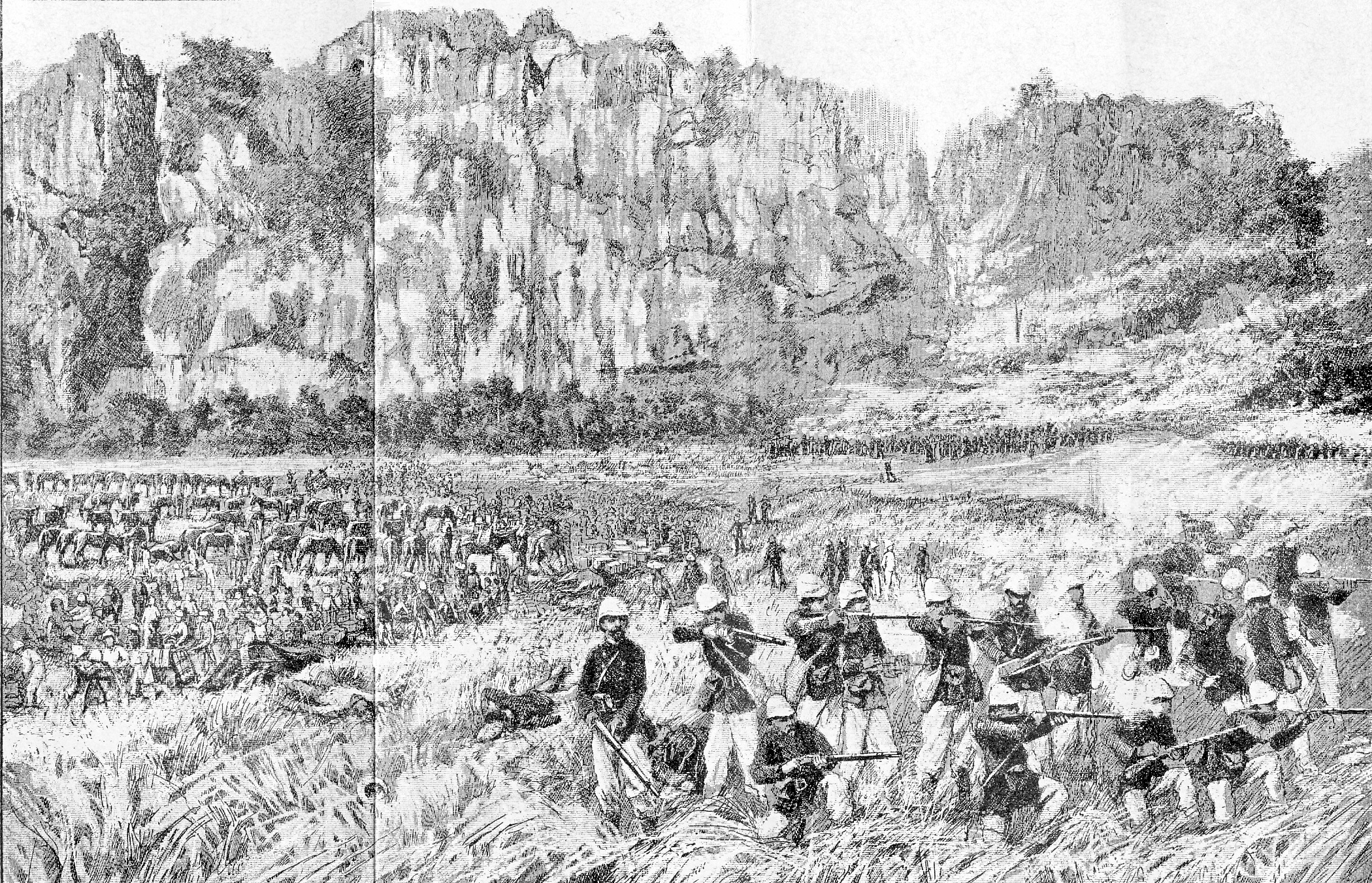
The Bac Lé ambush

On June 23, 1884, after the signing of the Tientsin Accord on June 3, Dugenne led a column of 799 French troops towards Langson. He encountered several thousand Chinese troops who opposed his passage. Dugenne sent a parliamentarian bearing a letter announcing that, having no order, he asks the commander of the French column to have one given to him by Peking.

Dugenne revealed that he had orders to go to Langson and that, in three hours, he would continue on his way. At the appointed time, he crossed the Thương River, but was turned back by the Chinese. Forced to make a retreat, he called Captain Maillard to go with his men to stand in the rear. After 2 hours, at 4 o'clock Maillard re-joined the main body, which had recrossed the river and was encamped on the right bank, bringing back a third of his men. When night came, in his rudimentary headquarters and under fire, Dugenne wrote a dispatch to the general-in-chief.

Lieutenant of the Marine Infantry Bailly, in charge of optical telegraphy, was instructed to try, from a hill on the left bank, to warn the French headquarters in Hanoi of the situation of the column. The light caught the attention of the Chinese, who rained a hail of bullets down the hill, but salvo fires made them believe that it was occupied by important forces. As such, the Chinese did not engage, which enabled the volunteers to regain the bulk of the column safe and sound, and continue their retreat in relative safety. The forces then arrived at Cau-son on June 30.

=== Final Years ===
Dugenne was later recalled to France in September. He was sent to Formosa (now Republic of China) at the beginning of 1885 and returned to Tonkin. He was appointed colonel in July 1887, he commanded the marching regiment of the French Foreign Legion and the circle of the 11th military region. He returned to France in May 1887, passing his command to Commander Diguet.

He then returned again to Tonkin after a brief visit to France, and died 20 December 1887 during a column of operations between the Thương River and the Cầu River against the Caï Kinh-le, a few kilometres north of Tin-Dao in the territory of Monkayo, from the rupture of an aneurysm. He was buried in Phu Lang Thuong.
