= Oscar de Négrier =

19th-century French general

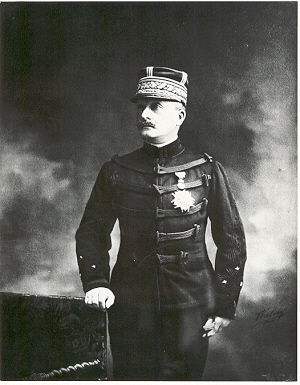
- General Oscar de Négrier
- Nickname: Maolen ("Quick!")
- Born: 2 October 1839; Belfort, France
- Died: 22 August 1913 (aged 73) off the Norwegian coast
- Allegiance: France
- Branch: French Army
- Rank: Général de division
- Commands: Tonkin Expeditionary Corps (1884)
- Conflicts: Franco-Prussian War; Tonkin campaign

François Oscar de Négrier (French pronunciation: [fʁɑ̃swa ɔskaʁ də neɡʁije]; 2 October 1839 – 22 August 1913), known as Oscar de Négrier, was a French general of the Third Republic, winning fame in Algeria in the Sud-Oranais campaign (1881) and in Tonkin during the Sino-French War (August 1884 – April 1885).

== Early career ==
Born in Belfort, France on 2 October 1839, De Négrier served with Marshal François Achille Bazaine's Army of the Rhine during the Franco-Prussian War, and was among the thousands of French officers who laid down their arms when Bazaine surrendered his army at Metz. He subsequently escaped from Prussian captivity and joined the armies of national defence for the rest of the war.

== Sino-French War ==
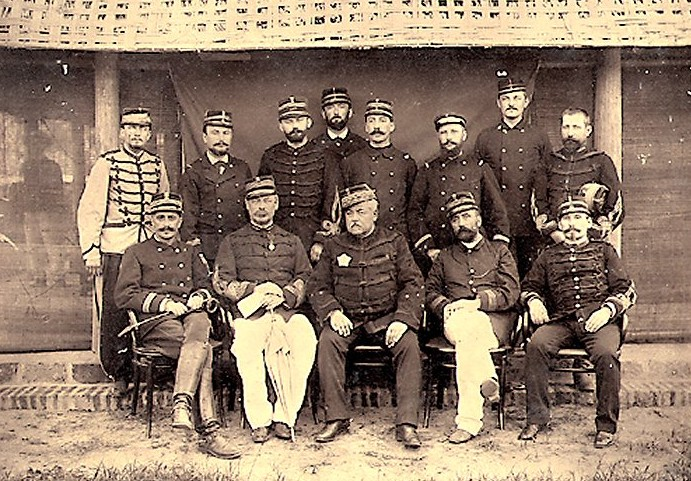
General Millot and his staff. De Négrier is sitting second to Millot's right.

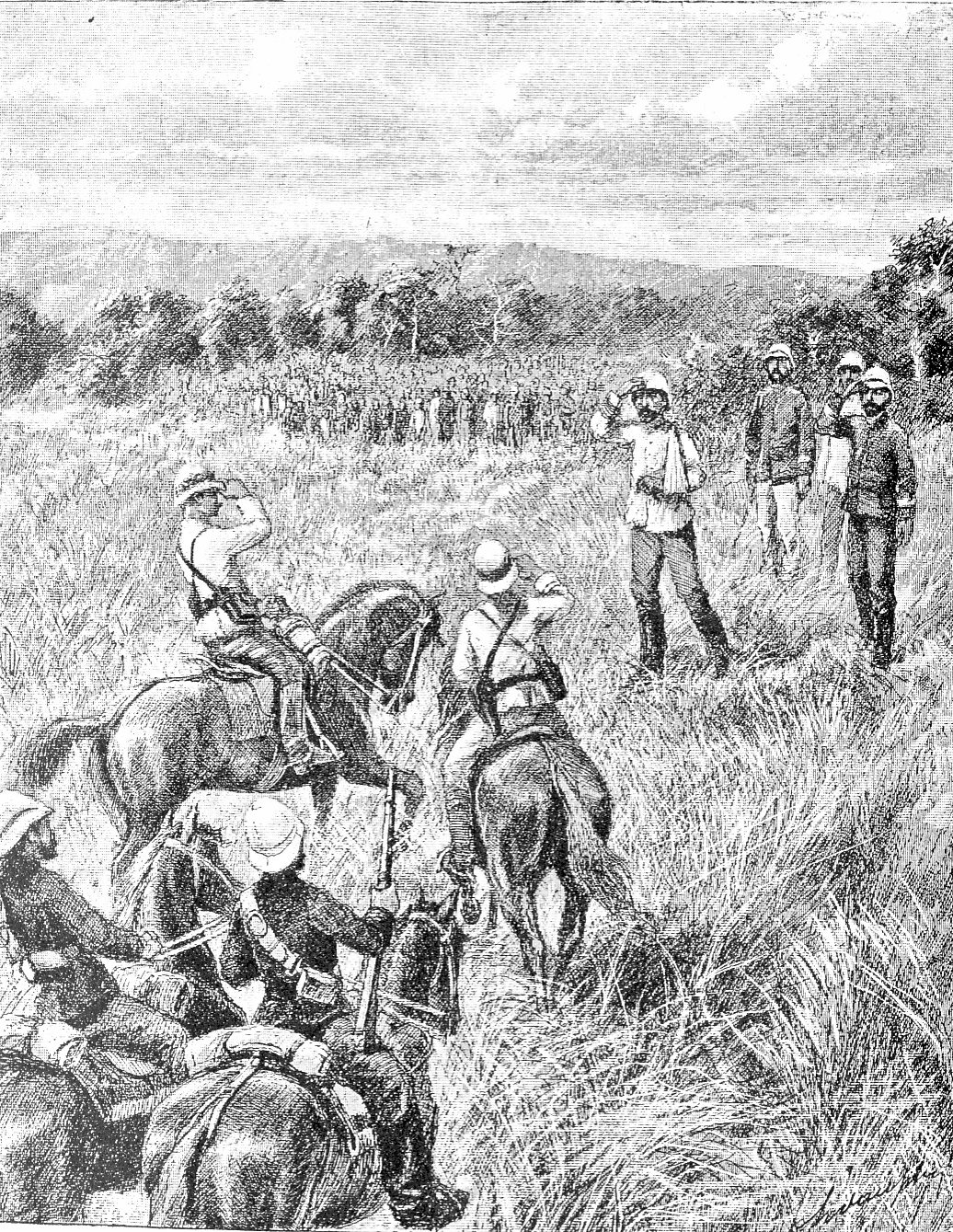
De Négrier joins Dugenne's column on the Bac Le plateau, 27 June 1884

De Négrier arrived in Tonkin in February 1884, and was given command of the 2nd Brigade of the Tonkin Expeditionary Corps. During the period of undeclared hostilities that preceded the Sino-French War he took part in the Bắc Ninh Campaign (March 1884) and the subsequent campaign to capture Hưng Hóa (April 1884). In June 1884 he was sent by General Charles-Théodore Millot, the general-in-chief of the Tonkin Expeditionary Corps, to the aid of Colonel Alphonse Dugenne with a relief column when the news of the Bắc Lệ ambush reached Hanoi.

During the Sino-French War he commanded the three French columns involved in the Kep Campaign (October 1884). The largest of these columns, under his personal command, defeated the right wing of the Cinese Guangxi Army at the Battle of Kep (8 October). De Négrier was wounded in the leg in this battle, and fell from his horse. His troops, believing that he had been killed, gave no quarter to the Chinese defenders when they stormed the village of Kep. In January 1885 de Négrier won the Battle of Núi Bop, often considered his professional masterpiece. In February 1885 he commanded the 2nd Brigade in the Lạng Sơn Campaign, in which the Tonkin Expeditionary Corps drove the Chinese from their entrenched camps at Dong Song and Bac Vie and captured Lạng Sơn.

Immediately after the French capture of Lạng Sơn, General Louis Brière de l'Isle returned to Hanoi with Lieutenant-Colonel Giovanninelli's 1st Brigade to relieve the Siege of Tuyên Quang, leaving de Négrier at Lang Son with the 2nd Brigade. On 23 February 1885 de Négrier advanced from Lang Son and defeated the demoralised Guangxi Army at Đồng Đăng, close to the Chinese border, driving the Chinese out of Tonkin altogether. De Négrier briefly crossed into Guangxi province and blew up the Gate of China, an elaborate ceremonial gate erected by the Chinese at Zhennan Pass to mark the border between China and Annam.

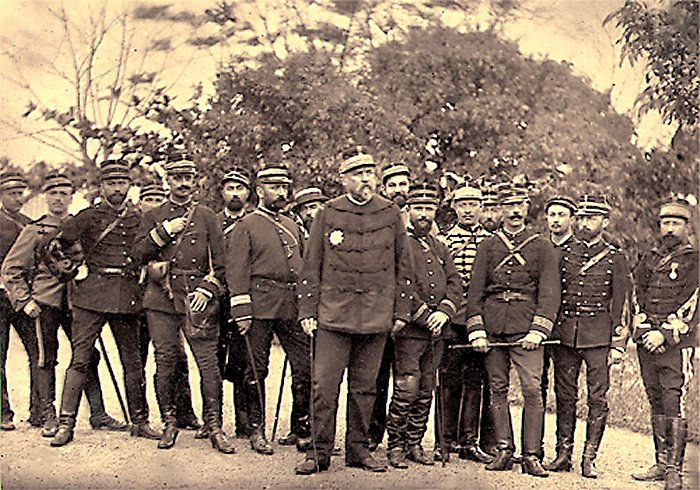
General Brière de l'Isle and his staff. De Négrier (with hand on chest) and Herbinger (clasping cane in both hands) are in the front row

The Chinese reinforced the Guangxi Army in March 1885, and on 22 March a detachment of Chinese troops from the command of Feng Zicai crossed into Tonkin and raided the French forward positions at Đồng Đăng. To discourage further incursions by the Chinese, de Négrier decided to pursue the raiders across the frontier with the bulk of the 2nd Brigade and attack the Chinese in their entrenched camp at Bang Bo near Zhennan Pass, hoping that the element of surprise would make up for his lack of numbers. On 23 March the French took the outworks of the Chinese camp at Bang Bo, but on 24 March 1885 further attacks on the Chinese miscarried, and de Négrier was forced to make a fighting retreat. The Battle of Bang Bo was the only defeat he suffered in his entire military career.

The Guangxi Army cautiously pursued the French, and four days later launched a disastrous frontal attack on the defences of Lạng Sơn. The battle of Ky Lua, on 28 March 1885, was a walkover victory for the French, but de Négrier was shot in the chest and seriously wounded while scouting the Chinese positions in preparation for a French counterattack, and was forced to hand over command to Lieutenant-Colonel Paul Gustave Herbinger, one of his two regimental commanders. Herbinger, a theoretical soldier with little experience of command in the field, lost his head. More than a thousand Chinese corpses lay in front of the 2nd Brigade's positions, and the Chinese could be seen falling back in disorder towards the frontier, leaving only a small rearguard at Ky Lua to protect their retreat. Herbinger was unimpressed. Ignoring all the evidence that the Guangxi Army had been decisively defeated, and convinced that the 2nd Brigade would be encircled if it remained where it was, he took the controversial decision to abandon Lạng Sơn and fall back to stronger defensive positions at Kep and Chu. This misjudgement transformed de Négrier's tactical victory at Ky Lua into a strategic defeat.

== Later career ==
De Négrier quickly recovered from his Ky Lua wound, and in May 1885, shortly after the end of the Sino-French War, was appointed to the command of the 2nd Division of the expanded Tonkin Expeditionary Corps. General Brière de l'Isle had been offered command of the 1st Division, and made it a condition of his acceptance that de Négrier got the 2nd Division. De Négrier was not at his best serving under General Roussel de Courcy. Instead of fighting set-piece battles against Chinese regular troops in which his tactical abilities had every opportunity to shine, he was required to conduct punitive sweeps against elusive Vietnamese guerilla concentrations. In December 1885 he swept the Bai Sai region near Hanoi with a column of 3,000 men. The sweep netted few guerillas, and French casualties from cholera in de Négrier's column were heavy. The exasperated French bayoneted any prisoners they took and de Négrier, a traditional soldier who found it difficult to adapt to the tactics of guerilla warfare, did nothing to stop them. The net result of this brutal campaign was probably to win more recruits and increase sympathy for the insurgents.

De Négrier was attached to the Imperial Japanese Army as an official French observer during the Russo-Japanese War, and published an account of the war, Lessons from the Russo-Japanese War (London, 1905), immediately after its close.

== De Négrier's leadership ==
De Négrier was by far the most popular French commander in Tonkin during the Sino-French War. After the Bắc Ninh Campaign the soldiers of the Tonkin Expeditionary Corps devised sardonic Vietnamese nicknames for General Charles-Théodore Millot and his two brigade commanders. De Négrier, admired for his driving energy, became Maolen (mau lên, 'Quick!'). Louis Brière de l'Isle, whose troops had been beaten to the punch at Bac Ninh by de Négrier's, was Mann Mann (màn màn, 'Slow!'). Millot, who had halted de Négrier's pursuit of the beaten Chinese army at Kep and, in the eyes of the soldiers, prevented him from going all the way to Lang Son, became Toi Toi (thôi thôi, 'Stop!').

De Négrier had a way with words that endeared him to most French soldiers. His most famous mot was made in December 1883 in Algeria, during a review of the 2nd Battalion of the French Foreign Legion on the eve of its departure for Tonkin to take part in the Bắc Ninh Campaign: Vous, légionnaires, vous êtes soldats pour mourir, et je vous envoie où l’on meurt! ('Legionnaires, you became soldiers in order to die, and I'm taking you to a place where you can die!')

De Négrier possessed to a high degree the quality known to the French as coup d'oeil, the ability to make an instant assessment of the battlefield and make the appropriate response. Sergeant Maury of the 2nd Legion Battalion witnessed de Négrier in action at the Battle of Pho Vy (10 February 1885), one of the many confused engagements against the Chinese during the Lạng Sơn Campaign:

Suddenly we stopped being spectators, and took a part in the action ourselves. General de Négrier rode over to give some orders to de Saxcé's battery, which we were still guarding, and called out to our captain, 'Cotter, have you got your whole company up?' 'Sir.' He turned to the battery captain. 'Your battery’s not in any danger, is it, de Saxcé?' 'Sir.' 'Right! Cotter, take your company and capture that hill. Those damned Chinese don't seem to want to be pushed off it.' Then he turned to us. 'Let's go, lads! Chins up, forward march! Show them you don't use your knives just to eat your rations!'

De Négrier had a hasty temper, but it was redeemed by a ready sense of humour, and his troops relished his occasional volcanic eruptions. Second Lieutenant René Normand of the 111th Line Battalion (killed in action a month later in the Battle of Bang Bo) recalled a typical incident during the Lạng Sơn Campaign in February 1885:

General de Négrier began to concentrate his brigade. The column was moving forward slowly, in single file, and as he watched it he remarked to us, 'The thing about warfare is that you have to learn to be patient.' No sooner were the words out of his mouth than a cannon bogged down. He spurred towards the wretched gun section. 'Oh, for God's sake! Keep the damned thing moving!' Then he burst out laughing, and that set us all off.
