= Tianjin Accord =

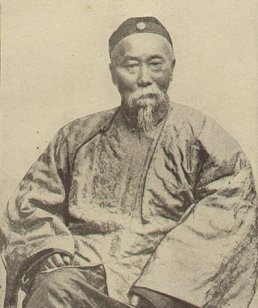
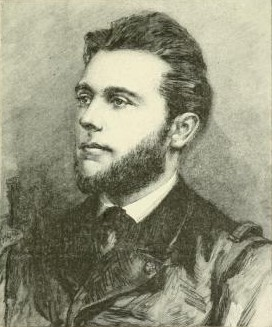
Li Hongzhang (left) and François-Ernest Fournier (right), the Chinese and French representatives who negotiated the Accord.

The Tianjin Accord or Li–Fournier Convention, concluded on 11 May 1884, was intended to settle an undeclared war between France and China over the sovereignty of Tonkin (northern Vietnam). The convention, negotiated by Li Hongzhang for China and capitaine de vaisseau François-Ernest Fournier for France, provided for a Chinese troop withdrawal from Tonkin in return for a comprehensive treaty that would settle details of trade and commerce between France and China and provide for the demarcation of its disputed border with Vietnam.

== Background ==
Chinese opposition to French efforts to clamp a protectorate on Tonkin led to the outbreak of an undeclared war between France and China towards the end of 1883. Chinese troops fought alongside Liu Yongfu's Black Flag Army during the Sơn Tây Campaign (December 1883). Although Admiral Courbet's capture of Son Tay paved the way for the eventual French conquest of Tonkin, the French now had to deal with open opposition from China as well as the Black Flag Army. Having exhausted diplomatic efforts to persuade the Chinese to withdraw their armies from Tonkin, the French government sanctioned an attack by General Charles Millot on the fortress of Bac Ninh, occupied since the autumn of 1882 by China's Guangxi Army. In March 1884, in the Bắc Ninh Campaign, Millot routed the Guangxi Army and captured Bắc Ninh.

The Chinese defeat at Bac Ninh, coming close on the heels of the fall of Sơn Tây, strengthened the hand of the moderate element in the Chinese government and temporarily discredited the extremist 'Purist' party led by Zhang Zhidong, which was agitating for a full-scale war against France. Further French successes in the spring of 1884, including the Capture of Hưng Hóa and Thái Nguyên, convinced the Empress Dowager Cixi that China should come to terms, and an accord was reached between France and China in May. The negotiations took place in Tianjin. Li Hongzhang, the leader of the Chinese moderates, represented China; and Captain François-Ernest Fournier, commander of the French cruiser Volta, represented France. The Tianjin Accord, concluded on 11 May 1884, provided for a Chinese troop withdrawal from Tonkin in return for a comprehensive treaty that would settle details of trade and commerce between France and China and provide for the demarcation of its disputed border with Vietnam.

== Text of the accord (original French) ==
The original French text of the accord, in five articles, is given below.

Art. 1. La France s’engage à respecter et à protéger contre toute agression d’une nation quelconque, et en toutes circonstances, les frontières méridionales de la Chine, limitrophes du Tonkin.

Art 2. Le Céleste Empire, rassuré par les garanties formelles de bon voisinage qui lui sont données par la France, quant à l’intégrité et à la sécurité des frontières méridionales de la Chine, s’engage : 1° à retirer immédiatement, sur ses frontières les garnisons chinoises du Tonkin; 2° à respecter dans le présent et dans l’avenir, les traités directement intervenus ou à intervenir entre la France et la Cour de Hué.

Art. 3. En reconnaissance de l'attitude conciliante du Gouvernement du Céleste Empire, et pour rendre hommage à la sagesse patriotique de Son Excellence Li-Hong-Chang, négociateur de cette convention, la France renonce à demander une indemnité à la Chine. En retour, la Chine s'engage à admettre, sur toute l’étendue de ses frontières méridionales limitrophes du Tonkin, le libre trafic des marchandises entre l’Annam et la France d’une part, et la Chine de l'autre, réglé par un traité de commerce et de tarifs à intervenir, dans l’esprit le plus conciliant, de la part des négociateurs chinois, et dans des conditions aussi avantageuses que possible pour le commerce français.

Art. 4. Le Gouvernement français s'engage à n'employer aucune expression de nature à porter atteinte au prestige du Céleste Empire, dans la rédaction du traité définitif qu’il va contracter avec l’Annam et qui abrogera les traités antérieurs relatifs au Tonkin.

Art. 5. Dès que la présente Convention aura été signée, les deux Gouvernements nommeront leurs Plénipotentiaires, qui se réuniront, dans un délai de trois mois, pour élaborer un traité définitif sur les bases fixées par les articles précédents.

Conformément aux usages diplomatiques, le texte français fera foi.

Fait à Tien-Tsin, le 11 mai 1884, le dix-septième jour de la quatrième lune de la dixième année du Kouang-Sin, en quatre expéditions (deux en langue française et deux en langue chinoise), sur lesquelles les Plénipotentiaires respectifs ont signé et apposé le sceau de leurs armes.

Chacun des Plénipotentiaires a gardé un exemplaire de chaque texte.

Signé : Ll-HONG-TCHANG. Signé : FOURNIER.

== Text of the accord (English translation) ==
Eastman's English translation, modified slightly where it departs too far from the original French, is given below.

Article I: France undertakes to respect and protect against aggression by any nation whatsoever, under any circumstances, the southern frontiers of China bordering on Tonkin.

Article II: The Celestial Empire, reassured by the formal guarantees of good-neighbourliness accorded to her by France as to the integrity and safety of the southern frontiers of China, undertakes: (1) to withdraw immediately to her borders the Chinese garrisons in Tonkin; and (2) to respect, now and in the future, the treaties directly concluded, or to be concluded, between France and the Court of Hue.

Article III: In recognition of the conciliatory attitude of the Government of the Celestial Empire, and as a tribute to the patriotic wisdom of His Excellency Li Hongzhang, the negotiator of this convention, France renounces her demand for an indemnity from China. In return, China undertakes to permit, over the whole extent of her southern frontiers bordering on Tonkin, free traffic in goods between Annam and France on the one part and China on the other, to be regulated by a commercial and customs treaty, which shall be drawn up in the most conciliatory spirit on the part of the Chinese negotiators and under the most advantageous conditions possible for French commerce.

Article IV: The French government engages not to employ any expression which might demean the prestige of the Celestial Empire in the drafting of the definitive treaty which it will shortly contract with Annam, which will abrogate existing treaties respecting Tonkin.

Article V: As soon as the present convention has been signed, the two governments shall name their plenipotentiaries, who shall meet in three months' time to work out the details of a definitive treaty on the bases established by the preceding articles.

In accordance with diplomatic usage, the French text shall be binding.

Done at Tianjin on 11 May 1884, the seventeenth day of the fourth month of the tenth year of Guangxu, in four impressions (two in French and two in Chinese), which the respective plenipotentiaries have signed and impressed with their official seals.

Each of the plenipotentiaries has retained one copy of each text.

Signed: Li Hongzhang. Signed: Fournier.

== Aftermath ==
On 6 June 1884, pursuant to Article IV of the Tianjin Accord, the French concluded a fresh Treaty of Huế with the Vietnamese, which provided for a French protectorate over both Annam and Tonkin and allowed the French to station troops in both territories and to install residents in the main towns. The signature of the treaty, which replaced the punitive Harmand Treaty of August 1883, was accompanied by an important symbolic gesture. The seal presented by the emperor of China several decades earlier to the Vietnamese king Gia Long was melted down in the presence of the French and Vietnamese plenipotentiaries, betokening the renunciation by Vietnam of its traditional links with China.

In theory, the conclusion of the Tianjin Accord should have resolved the confrontation over Tonkin between France and China. Fournier was not a professional diplomat, however, and the agreement contained several loose ends. Crucially, it failed to explicitly state a deadline for the Chinese troop withdrawal from Tonkin. The French asserted that the troop withdrawal was to take place immediately, while the Chinese argued that the withdrawal was contingent upon the conclusion of the comprehensive treaty. In fact, the Chinese stance was an ex post facto rationalisation, designed to justify their unwillingness or inability to put the terms of the accord into effect. The accord was extremely unpopular in China, and provoked an immediate backlash. The war party called for Li Hongzhang's impeachment, and his political opponents intrigued to have orders sent to the Chinese troops in Tonkin to hold their positions.

The intransigence of the Chinese hardliners resulted in a bloody clash between French and Chinese troops near Bac Le on 23 June 1884, which plunged both countries into a fresh crisis. China's refusal to pay an indemnity for the Bắc Lệ ambush led directly to the outbreak of the Sino-French War on 23 August 1884.

== See also ==
- Treaty of Tianjin (1885)
