= Bắc Ninh campaign =

- Part of the Tonkin campaign
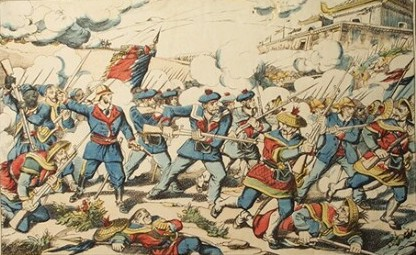
- The capture of Bắc Ninh, 12 March 1884
Date	6 to 24 March 1884 (2 weeks, 4 days)
Location	Bắc Ninh, northern Vietnam
Result	French victory

Belligerents
France	Qing dynasty Black Flag Army

Commanders and leaders
(French Third Republic) Charles-Théodore Millot (French Third Republic) Louis Brière de l'Isle (French Third Republic) François de Négrier	(Qing dynasty) Xu Yanxu (Qing dynasty) Huang Guilan (Qing dynasty) Zhao Wo; Liu Yongfu

Strength
10,000 soldiers, 6 gunboats	20,000 Chinese soldiers 3,000 Black Flag soldiers

Casualties and losses
9 killed 39 wounded	100 killed 400 wounded

The Bắc Ninh campaign (6–24 March 1884) was one of a series of clashes between French and Chinese forces in northern Vietnam during the Tonkin campaign (1883–86). The campaign, fought during the period of undeclared hostilities that preceded the Sino-French War (August 1884 – April 1885), resulted in the French capture of Bắc Ninh and the complete defeat of China's Guangxi Army.

== Background ==
In March 1884, following their victory at Sơn Tây in December 1883, the French renewed their offensive in Tonkin under the command of General Charles-Théodore Millot, who took over responsibility for the land campaign from Admiral Amédée Courbet in February 1884. Reinforcements from France and the African colonies had now raised the strength of the Tonkin Expeditionary Corps to over 10,000 men, and Millot organised this force into two brigades. The 1st Brigade was commanded by General Louis Brière de l'Isle, who had earlier made his reputation as governor of Senegal, and the 2nd Brigade was commanded by the charismatic young Foreign Legion general François de Négrier, who had recently quelled a serious Arab rebellion in Algeria.

The French target was Bắc Ninh, garrisoned by a strong force of regular Chinese troops of the Guangxi Army. The commander-in-chief of the Chinese forces at Bắc Ninh was Xu Yanxu (徐延旭), governor of Guangxi. Elderly and in poor health, Xu remained at Lạng Sơn and delegated the operational command of the Chinese army to his subordinates, Huang Guilan (黃桂蘭) and Zhaowo (趙沃). Huang and Zhao, veterans of the Anhui and Hunan armies respectively, were disinclined to cooperate. The Chinese had about 20,000 troops around Bắc Ninh. Half of the Chinese army was deployed astride the Mandarin Road southwest of Bắc Ninh. The other half was deployed east of Bắc Ninh on the Trung Sơn and Đáp Cầu heights, protecting the southern approaches to Bắc Ninh and covering the vital river crossings to Thái Nguyên and Lạng Sơn at Phú Cẩm and Đáp Cầu.

== French order of battle ==
The French expeditionary column that marched on Bắc Ninh was the largest French military concentration of the Tonkin campaign. After making troop deductions for garrison duty, Millot was able to give each of his brigade commanders two marching regiments (régiments de marche), each containing the equivalent of three infantry battalions. Professional protocol prevented him from mixing the battalions of the marine infantry, the armée d'Afrique and the metropolitan army (armée de terre), and he was obliged to create one regiment of marine infantry, two 'Algerian' regiments of troops from the armée d'Afrique, and one French regiment. One of the 'Algerian' regiments contained the three Turco battalions then in Tonkin, the other the white formations of the Foreign Legion and African Light Infantry. These four marching regiments were commanded respectively by Lieutenant-Colonels Bertaux-Levillain, Belin, Duchesne and Defoy. Each brigade also contained a battalion of armed sailors (fusiliers-marins), commanded respectively by capitaines de frégate Laguerre and de Beaumont.

- 1st Brigade (général de brigade Louis Brière de l'Isle)
  - 1st Marching Regiment (Lieutenant-Colonel Bertaux-Levillain)
    - marine infantry battalion (chef de bataillon Reygasse)
    - marine infantry battalion (chef de bataillon Coronnat)
  - 2nd Marching Regiment (Lieutenant-Colonel Belin)
    - 1st Battalion, 3rd Algerian Rifle Regiment (chef de bataillon Godon)
    - 2nd Battalion, 1st Algerian Rifle Regiment (chef de bataillon Hessling)
    - 3rd Battalion, 3rd Algerian Rifle Regiment (chef de bataillon de Mibielle)
  - fusilier-marin battalion (capitaine de frégate Laguerre)
  - Brigade artillery (chef d'escadron de Douvres)
    - 1st, 2nd and 6th Marine Artillery Batteries bis (Captains Régis, Vintemberger and Dudraille)
    - 11th Battery, 12th Army Artillery Regiment (Captain Jourdy)
    - naval artillery battery, corps de débarquement.
- 2nd Brigade (général de brigade François de Négrier)
  - 3rd Marching Regiment (Lieutenant-Colonel Defoy)
    - 23rd Line Infantry Battalion (chef de bataillon Godart)
    - 111th Line Infantry Battalion (Lieutenant-Colonel Chapuis)
    - 143rd Line Infantry Battalion (chef de bataillon Farret)
  - 4th Marching Regiment (Lieutenant-Colonel Duchesne)
    - 1st Foreign Legion Battalion (chef de bataillon Donnier)
    - 2nd Foreign Legion Battalion (chef de bataillon Hutin)
    - 2nd African Light Infantry Battalion (chef de bataillon Servière)
  - fusilier-marin battalion (capitaine de frégate de Beaumont)
  - Brigade artillery (chef d'escadron Chapotin)
    - 3rd and 4th Marine Artillery Batteries bis (Captains Roussel and Roperh)
    - 12th Battery, 12th Army Artillery Regiment (Captain de Saxcé)
    - naval artillery half-battery, corps de débarquement.

== French high command, Bắc Ninh campaign ==
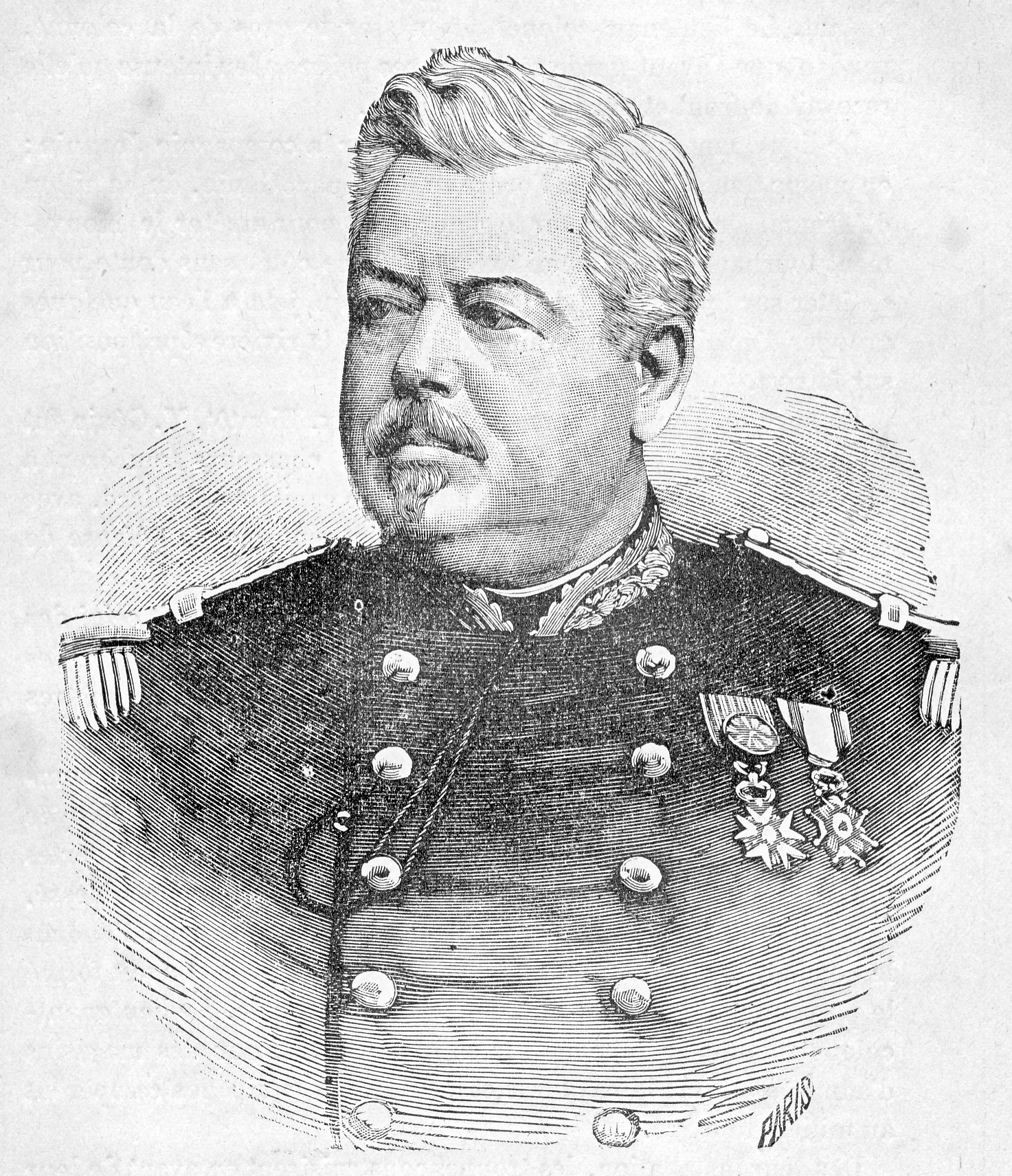
General Charles-Théodore Millot (1829–89)

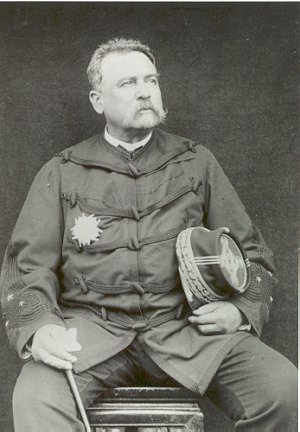
General Louis Brière de l'Isle (1827–96)

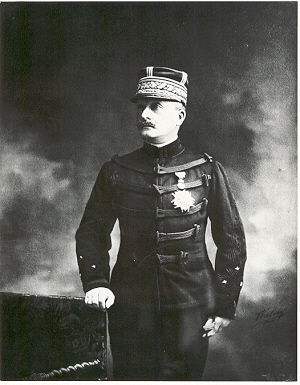
General François de Négrier (1842–1913)

== The campaign ==
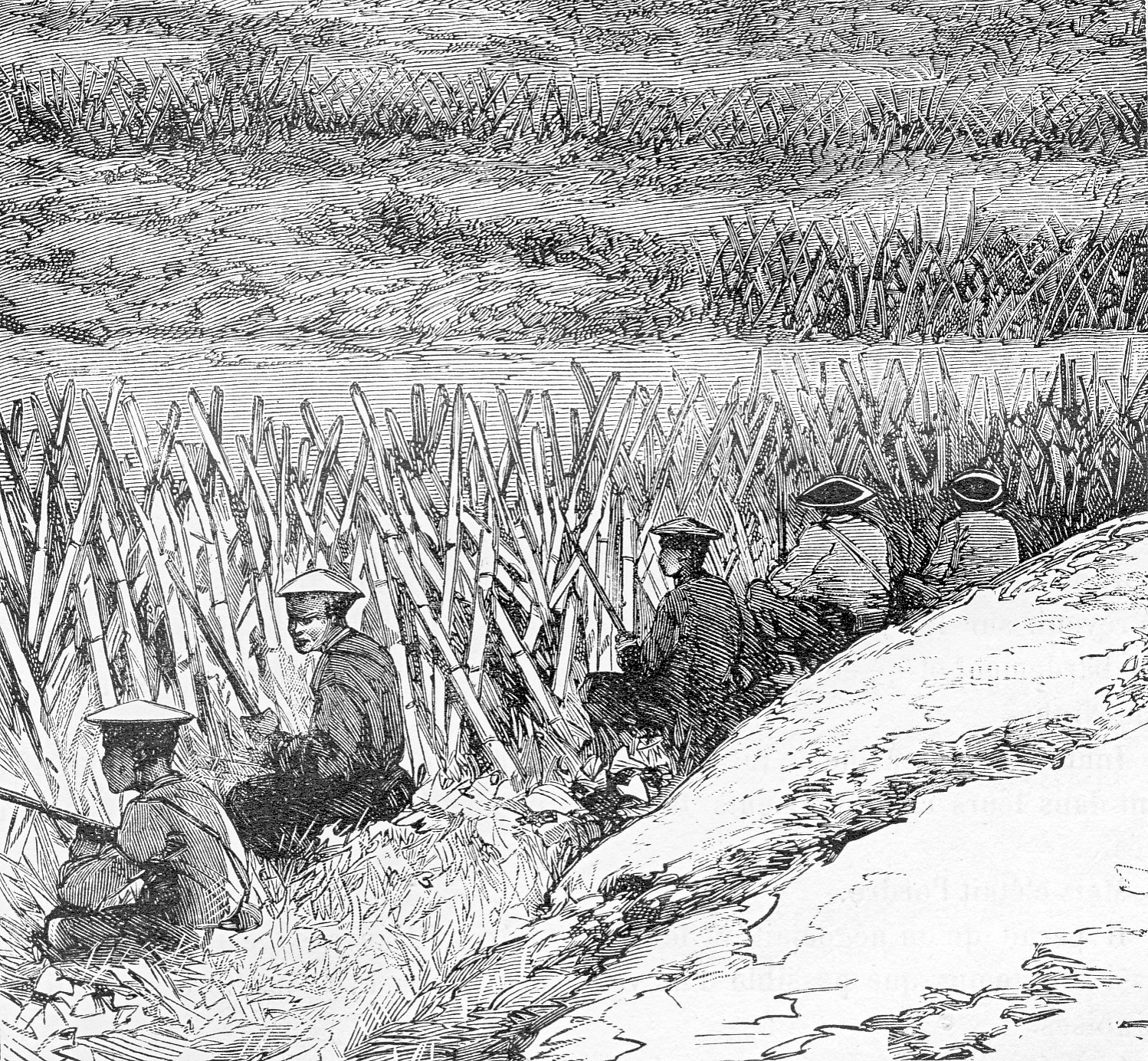
Chinese defences on the Mandarin Road to the southwest of Bắc Ninh. Millot bypassed the main Chinese positions and attacked Bắc Ninh from the southeast

The campaign was a walkover for the French. Morale in the Chinese army was low, and Liu Yongfu was careful to keep his experienced Black Flags out of danger. The French assaulted Bắc Ninh on 12 March from the southeast, with complete success. In the first week of March, Millot concentrated Brière de l'Isle's 1st Brigade at Hanoi and de Négrier's 2nd Brigade at Hải Dương. The two brigades would both make independent approach marches to Bắc Ninh, and would meet up only on the battlefield. Millot was hoping not only to capture Bắc Ninh but also to annihilate the Guangxi Army. His plan was to bypass the Chinese defences along the Mandarin Road and assault the Chinese left wing southeast of Bắc Ninh. A crucial element in this plan was the seizure of the river crossings to the north of Bắc Ninh at Đáp Cầu and Phú Cẩm by a flotilla of gunboats under the command of capitaine de vaisseau de Beaumont, to cut the Guangxi Army's line of retreat to Lạng Sơn and Thái Nguyên.

On 6 March, the 1st Brigade assembled north of Hanoi on the western bank of the Red River, and, on the next day (7 March), its 5,000 combatants and 4,500 Vietnamese porters were ferried across the Red River. Marching along the southern bank of the 80-metre-wide Canal des Rapides, where the Chinese could not attack it, the brigade outflanked the Chinese defences along the Mandarin Road. On 9 March it reached the village of Xam. On the same day it was joined by the gunboats Éclair and Trombe, which had sailed up from Hải Dương with the materials needed to construct a bridge of boats across the canal. On 10 March the brigade bridged the Canal des Rapides and on 11 March crossed to its northern bank, bivouacking 20 kilometres to the southeast of Bắc Ninh in the village of Chi.

While the 1st Brigade was outflanking the Chinese defences to the southwest of Bắc Ninh, de Négrier's 2nd Brigade advanced from Hải Dương to Sept Pagodes, at the junction of the Thái Bình and Sông Cầu rivers. On 8 March the brigade advanced along the southern bank of the Sông Cầu, attacking the Chinese advanced positions at Ne Ou and Do Son. Part of the brigade pinned the Chinese frontally, while a strong force was put ashore by the gunboats behind the Chinese positions at Phủ Lạng. Seeing their line of retreat threatened, the Chinese abandoned the Ne Ou and Do Son forts and fell back to Bắc Ninh. The 2nd Brigade occupied the Chinese forts and extended its line to the southwest to join hands with the 1st Brigade at Chi.

== The battle for Bắc Ninh ==
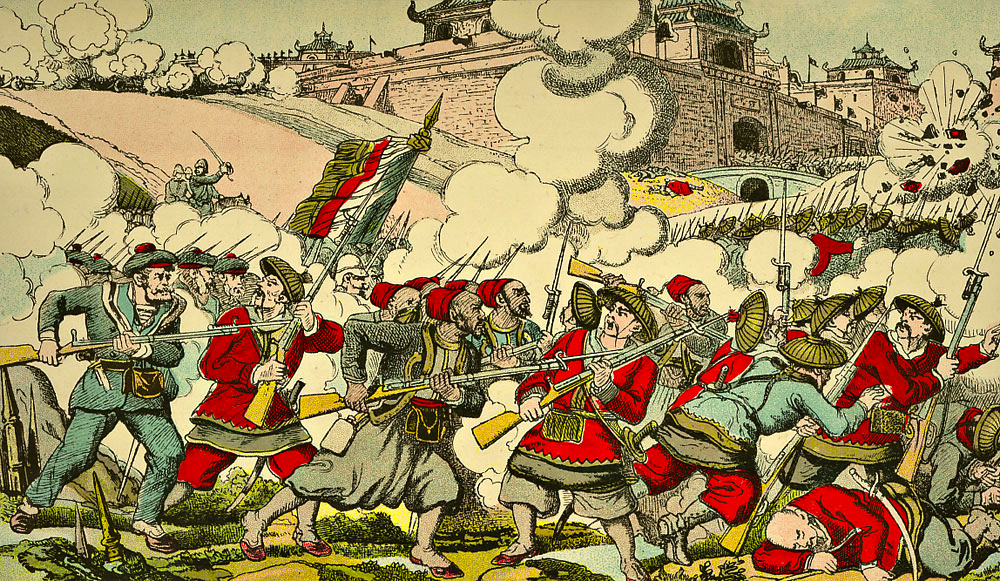
Turcos and fusiliers-marins at Bắc Ninh, 12 March 1884

The united French column attacked the Guangxi Army's positions to the southeast of Bắc Ninh on 12 March. On the left, Godon's Turcos and Coronnat's marine infantry of Brière de l'Isle's 1st Brigade drove the Chinese from the Trung Sơn heights. On the right, the legionnaires and line infantry of de Négrier's 2nd Brigade captured the Chinese positions around the Christian village of Keroi, also known as Xuan Hoa. The Chinese at Trung Sơn made little attempt to stand up to the French, abandoning their positions before Brière de l'Isle's troops could reach them. The Chinese facing the 2nd Brigade put up a stiffer fight, forcing the French to storm Keroi with the bayonet. De Négrier attacked Keroi with the 143rd Line Battalion and the 2nd Legion Battalion. The French troops had been ordered not to fire until they approached within 250 metres of the enemy positions, and the two attacking battalions waded through the waist-high water of the paddy fields in front of the village under Chinese fire until they reached the prescribed distance. They then delivered several disciplined volleys which beat down the enemy fire. Colonel Jacques Duchesne, the future conqueror of Madagascar, then led them in a charge against the Chinese positions. The French broke into the village after a short hand-to-hand struggle, and the Chinese fell back in disorder.

While de Négrier's infantry were engaged around Keroi, de Beaumont's gunboats forced the Lạng Bưởi barrage on the Sông Cầu River and sailed upriver towards Đáp Cầu and Phú Cẩm. Just before 16:00 the infantry of the 2nd Brigade and the fusiliers-marins of the flotilla arrived almost simultaneously at Đáp Cầu, just east of Bắc Ninh. De Négrier ordered the 2nd Legion Battalion and the 23rd Line Battalion to storm an important Chinese fort on the Đáp Cầu heights, but de Beaumont's fusiliers-marins arrived first and captured the fort. The appearance of the French on the Đáp Cầu heights demoralised the Guangxi Army's left wing. Its line of retreat to Lạng Sơn was threatened, its positions at Keroi, Lạng Bưởi, and Đáp Cầu had been taken with ease, and it was under accurate artillery fire. The only concern now for most of the Chinese troops facing the 2nd Brigade was to escape along the road to Lạng Sơn before the French cut it off. Chinese resistance on this part of the battlefield collapsed completely. Meanwhile, the disorderly retreat of the Guangxi Army's left wing placed the army's right wing to the south of Bắc Ninh, already demoralised by the drubbing it had received from Brière de l'Isle, in extreme jeopardy. The generals commanding the right wing saw the Chinese front break on their left and realised that they would be surrounded if they stayed any longer in their present positions. They immediately decamped and headed for Bắc Ninh and the road north to safety. At 17:00 a remarkable sight greeted the French troops on the Đáp Cầu heights. The Chinese flag was still flying from an octagonal tower inside the citadel of Bắc Ninh, but between the city and the Đáp Cầu and Trung Sơn heights, the Bắc Ninh plain was filled with fleeing Chinese milling in panic towards Bắc Ninh, desperate to escape before their line of retreat was cut off completely.

De Négrier's troops took Bắc Ninh in the early evening, capturing large quantities of ammunition and a number of brand new Krupp cannon that hadn't fired a shot during the battle. Without waiting for Millot to come up from Trung Sơn with Brière de l'Isle's 1st Brigade, de Négrier entered Bắc Ninh and secured the town. However, Millot's hopes for a complete encirclement of the Chinese army were not realised. A Chinese rearguard at Đáp Cầu fought de Négrier's infantry just long enough to allow the bulk of the Chinese army to stream northwards through Bắc Ninh and escape to the northern bank of the Sông Cầu river. Meanwhile, although de Beaumont's flotilla had forced the Làng Bưởi barrage and ascended the Sông Cầu as far as Đáp Cầu, other Chinese barrages slowed its progress upriver to Phú Cẩm. As a result, the French were unable to cut the routes to Thái Nguyên and Lạng Sơn and prevent the escape of the Chinese army.

== The pursuit ==
Nevertheless, Millot had won a remarkable victory, and the Tonkin expeditionary corps pursued the Chinese vigorously. Brière de l'Isle advanced as far as Thái Nguyên, where he defeated a mixed force of Chinese, Vietnamese and Black Flags on 19 March. On 15 March de Négrier defeated Huang Guilan's rearguard at Phủ Lạng Thương and chased his wing of the Guangxi Army up to Kép. In accordance with Millot's orders, both brigade commanders returned to Bắc Ninh shortly afterwards, de Négrier on 20 March and Brière de l'Isle on 24 March.

As far as the soldiers of the Tonkin Expeditionary Corps were concerned, de Négrier was the hero of the Bắc Ninh campaign. They were amused that he had entered Bắc Ninh on the evening of 12 March without waiting for General Millot's permission to do so. After the Bắc Ninh campaign the soldiers devised sardonic Vietnamese nicknames for Millot and his two brigade commanders. De Négrier, admired for his driving energy, became Maolen (Quick!). Brière de l'Isle, whose troops had been beaten to the punch at Bắc Ninh by de Négrier, was Mann Mann (Slow!). Millot, who had halted de Négrier's pursuit of the beaten Chinese army at Kép and, in the eyes of the soldiers, prevented him from going all the way to Lạng Sơn, became Toi Toi ('Stop!').

== Casualties ==
French casualties in the Bắc Ninh campaign were 9 dead and 39 wounded. Chinese casualties may have amounted to around 100 dead and 400 wounded.

== Significance ==
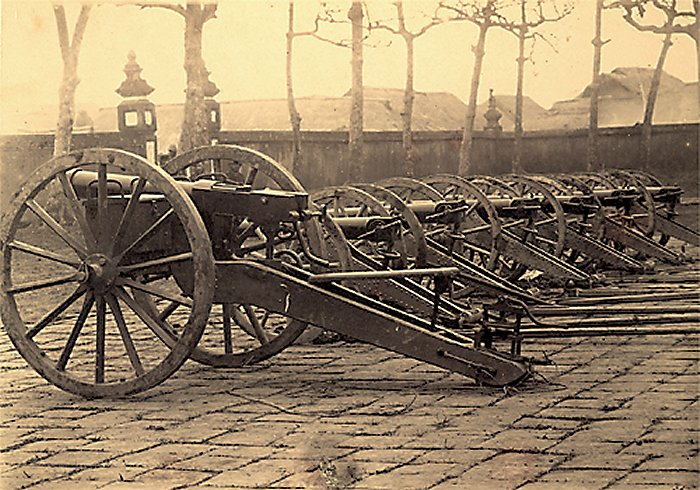
Chinese cannon captured at Bắc Ninh

The defeat of the Guangxi Army at Bắc Ninh was a considerable embarrassment to the Empress Dowager Cixi and a severe shock to the war party in China. Three months earlier, at Sơn Tây, Liu Yongfu's Black Flag Army had fought bitterly and inflicted heavy casualties on the French. At Bắc Ninh, most of the Chinese troops had fled. The empress dowager, furious at the miserable performance of her generals, punished several senior Chinese officials. Xu Yanxu and Tang Qiong (唐炯), the governors of Guangxi and Yunnan, were dismissed from their posts, Xu for losing the battle at Bắc Ninh, and Tang for not coming to his aid with the Yunnan Army, then occupying Hưng Hóa. The field commanders Huang Guilan and Zhao Wo were also disgraced. Huang, anticipating his disgrace, committed suicide at Lạng Sơn on 14 March. Two more junior commanders, Chen Degui (陳得貴) and Dang Minxuan (黨敏宣), were beheaded in front of their troops at Lạng Sơn on 26 May.

The defeat at Bắc Ninh, coming close on the heels of the fall of Sơn Tây, strengthened the hand of the moderate element in the Chinese government and temporarily discredited the extremist 'Purist' party led by Zhang Zhidong, which was agitating for a full-scale war against France. Further French successes in the spring of 1884, including the capture of Hưng Hóa and Thái Nguyên, convinced the empress dowager that China should come to terms, and an accord was reached between France and China in May. The negotiations took place in Tientsin. Li Hongzhang, the leader of the Chinese moderates, represented China; and Captain François-Ernest Fournier, commander of the French warship Volta, represented France. The Tientsin Accord, concluded on 11 May 1884, provided for a Chinese troop withdrawal from Tonkin in return for a comprehensive treaty that would settle details of trade and commerce between France and China and provide for the demarcation of its disputed border with Vietnam.
