= Guangxi Army =

Army used in the Qing dynasty

The Guangxi Army was an army raised by the Qing dynasty (China) to fight in the Sino-French War during the Tonkin Campaign.
