= Tonkin Expeditionary Corps =

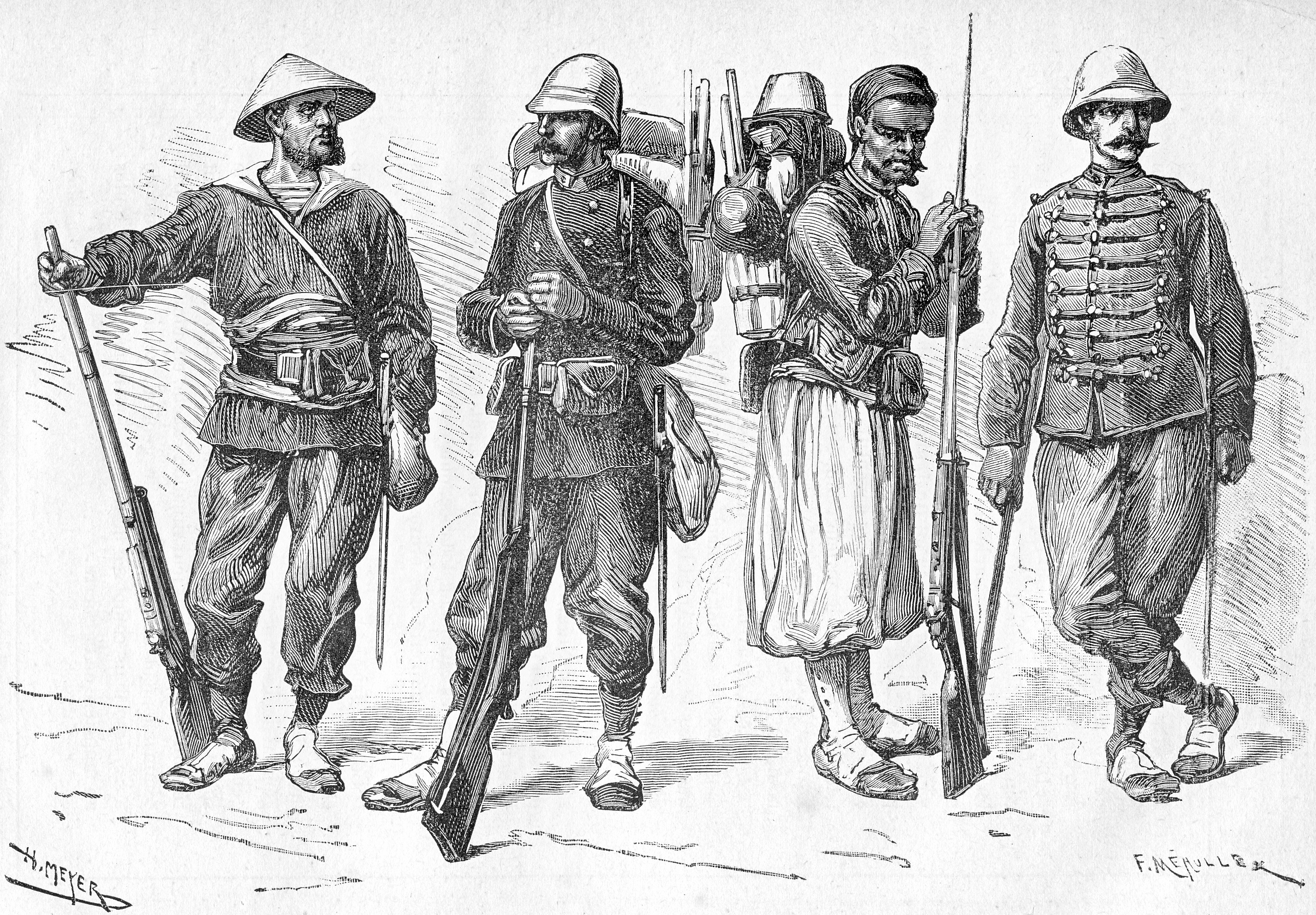
- Soldiers of the Tonkin expeditionary corps in 1885 (from left to right : Naval Fusilier in coolie hat, Marine infantryman, Turco and Marine artilleryman).
- Active: 1883–1886
- Country: France
- Role: Establishment of French protectorate in Tonkin
- Size: 35,000 by summer 1885
- Engagements: Tonkin Campaign, Sino-French War

Commanders
- Notable commanders: Alexandre-Eugène Bouët; Amédée Courbet; Charles-Théodore Millot; Louis Brière de l'Isle

The Tonkin Expeditionary Corps (French: corps expéditionnaire du Tonkin) was a French military command based in northern Vietnam (Tonkin) from June 1883 to April 1886. The expeditionary corps fought the Tonkin Campaign (1883–86) taking part in campaigns against the Black Flag Army and the Chinese Yunnan and Guangxi Armies during the Sino-French War (August 1884–April 1885) and the period of undeclared hostilities that preceded it (August 1883–June 1884), and in important operations against Vietnamese guerrilla bands during the subsequent 'Pacification of Tonkin' (May 1885–February 1886).

== Commanders and campaigns ==
=== General Alexandre-Eugène Bouët (1833–87) ===
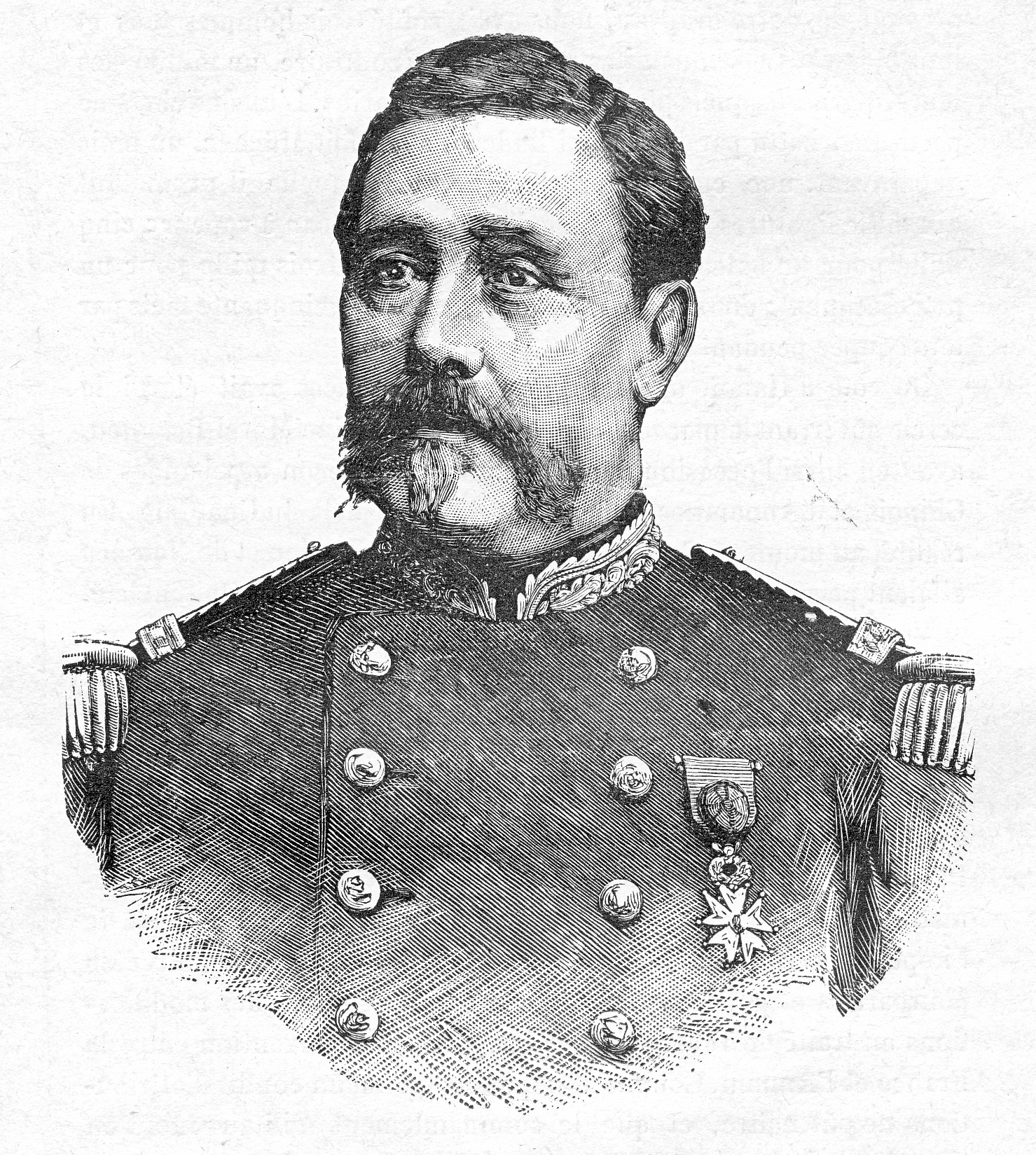
General Alexandre-Eugène Bouët (1833–87)

The expeditionary corps was established in June 1883 in the wake of Henri Rivière's defeat and death at the Battle of Paper Bridge, to entrench the French protectorate in Tonkin. Its first commander was général de brigade Alexandre-Eugène Bouët (1833–87), the most senior marine infantry officer available in the French colony of Cochinchina. Bouët introduced a lightweight black pyjama summer uniform for French troops in Tonkin, and also ordered them to cover their white pith helmets with black cloth to make themselves less conspicuous. These were sensible innovations, which were appreciated by the common soldiers. Bouët's first task was to secure the French posts in Hanoi, Nam Định and Haiphong against Black Flag and Vietnamese attacks. In July 1883 he prepared to go over to the offensive, recruiting a force of 800 Yellow Flag soldiers to augment the French forces at his disposal. Pressured by the civil commissioner-general Jules Harmand to attack the Black Flags as soon as possible in their positions on the Day River, he took the field in August 1883, despite the heat and humidity of the Tonkin summer. Bouët twice attacked the entrenchments held by Liu Yongfu's Black Flag army, at the Battle of Phủ Hoài (15 August 1883) and the Battle of Palan (1 September 1883). Both battles were disappointing for the French, and Bouët's command was also dogged by disagreements with Jules Harmand over French strategy in Tonkin. In early September 1883 Bouët resigned. Shortly before his resignation he recommended to the French government that the Tonkin Expeditionary Corps should be constituted as a regular two-brigade army division with the normal complement of artillery and ancillary support. This recommendation was accepted by the army ministry and implemented in February 1884.

=== Lieutenant-Colonel Anicet-Edmond-Justin Bichot (1835–1908) ===
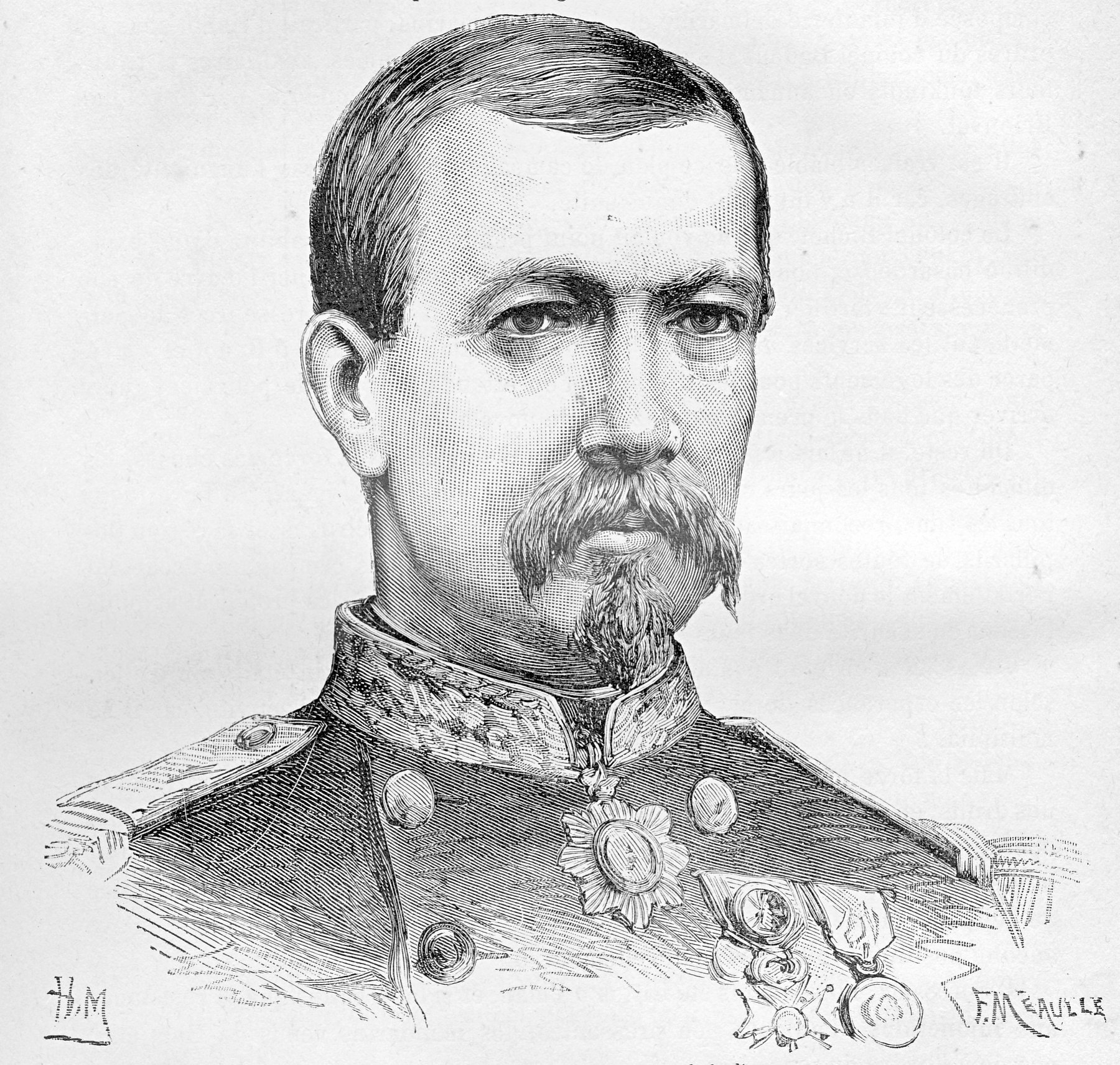
Lieutenant-Colonel Anicet-Edmond-Justin Bichot (1835–1908)

In the wake of Bouët's unexpected resignation, command of the expeditionary corps fell briefly to Lieutenant-Colonel Anicet-Edmond-Justin Bichot (1835–1908), the ranking marine infantry officer in Tonkin. Bichot's interregnum lasted only a few weeks, and saw no large-scale battles between the French and the Black Flags. His short tenure of command was chiefly notable for a reconnaissance in force towards Sơn Tây on 18 September 1883, in the course of which the French discovered the remains of Commandant Henri Rivière, who had been killed in action at the Battle of Paper Bridge (19 May 1883) and whose mutilated body had been buried close to the battlefield, in the village of Kien Mai.

=== Admiral Anatole-Amédée-Prosper Courbet (1827–85) ===
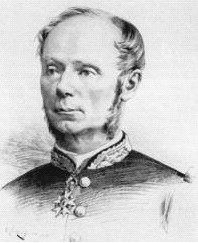
Admiral Anatole-Amédée-Prosper Courbet (1827-85)

Upon the arrival of substantial French reinforcements in Tonkin in November and December 1883, the French government placed Admiral Amédée Courbet, the commander of the Tonkin Coasts naval division, in command of the expeditionary corps. Courbet commanded the expeditionary corps during the Sơn Tây Campaign (December 1883). Among his many other talents, Courbet was a first-class administrator, and was deeply respected by the men of the expeditionary corps for the pains he took to ensure that military life ran as smoothly as possible for them. Long after his departure, this aspect of his command was remembered. If the mail went astray, or if a unit lost its way during a route march, the soldiers would say 'This wouldn't have happened if Courbet were still in command!'

The 1883 campaigns in Tonkin were conducted, like most French colonial enterprises, by the troupes de marine, and had been overseen by the navy ministry. In December 1883, however, in view of the increasing commitment of troops from Algeria to Tonkin, the army ministry insisted on appointing a general from the regular army to command of the Tonkin Expeditionary Corps, which would be henceforth be constituted as a two-brigade infantry division with the normal complement of artillery and other supporting arms. Jules Ferry's cabinet approved this recommendation, and Courbet was replaced in command of the expeditionary corps on 16 December 1883 by General Charles-Théodore Millot—ironically, on the very day on which he captured Sơn Tây. He resumed command of the Tonkin Coasts naval division, and for the next six months played a most unwelcome subordinate role, hunting down bands of Vietnamese pirates in the Gulf of Tonkin while Millot was winning glory in the Bắc Ninh campaign.

=== General Charles-Théodore Millot (1829–89) ===
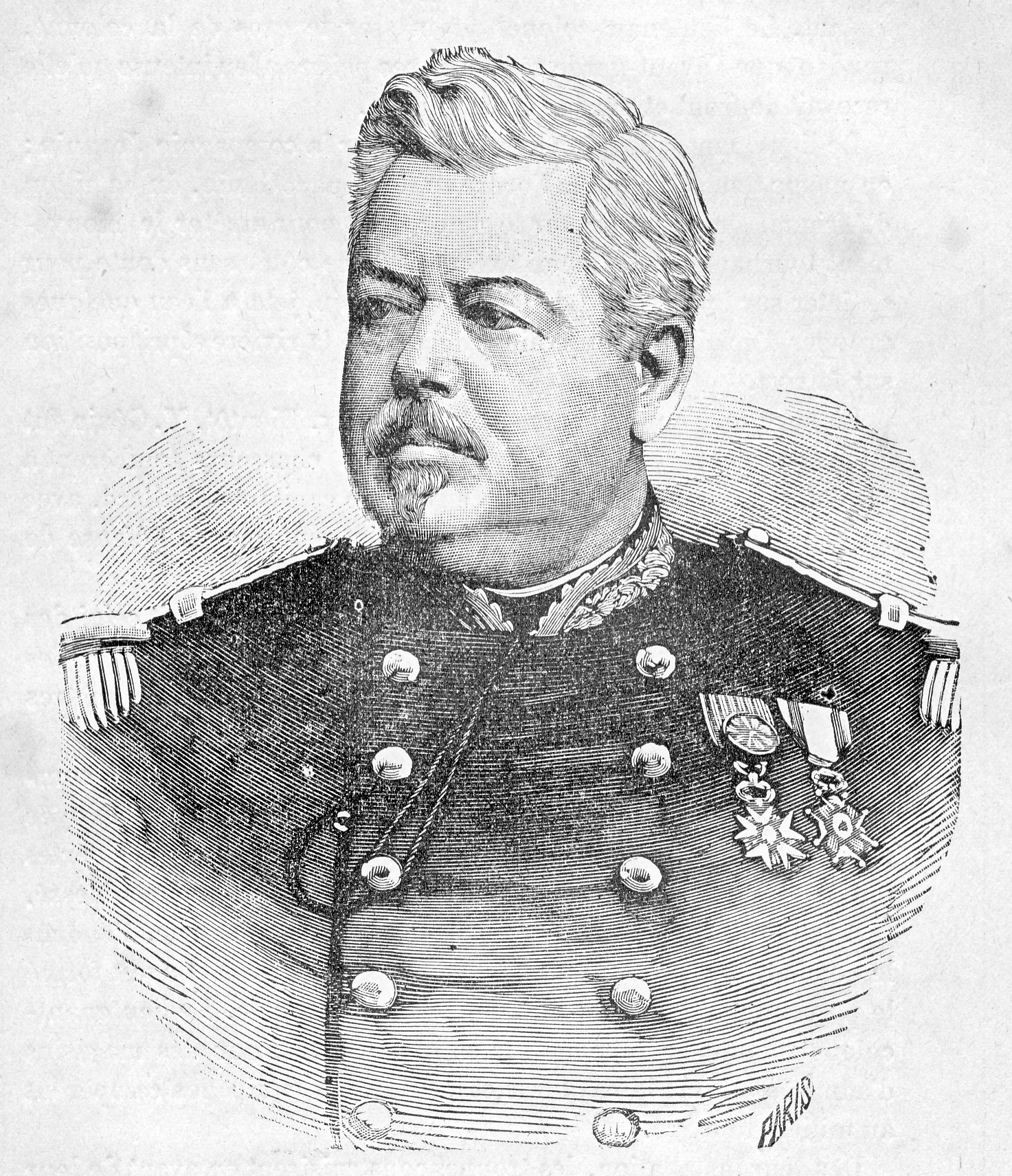
General Charles-Théodore Millot (1829–89)

In early 1884 the arrival of substantial reinforcements from France and the African colonies raised the strength of the expeditionary corps to over 10,000 men. Its new commander, général de division Charles-Théodore Millot (1829–1889), organised this force into two brigades. The 1st Brigade was commanded by général de brigade Louis Brière de l'Isle (1827–1896), who had earlier made his reputation as governor of Senegal. The 2nd Brigade was commanded by général de brigade François de Négrier (1842–1913), a charismatic young Foreign Legion commander who had recently quelled a serious Arab rebellion in Algeria.

Millot commanded the expeditionary corps for eight months, from February to September 1884. During his tenure of command he organised two major campaigns to capture Bắc Ninh and Hưng Hóa (March and April 1884) and two more modest expeditions to capture Thái Nguyên and Tuyên Quang (May and June 1884). In the Bắc Ninh campaign he won a spectacular walkover victory against Xu Yanxu's Guangxi Army. In the Hưng Hóa campaign he flanked Liu Yongfu out of a formidable defensive system without losing a man. Having argued strenuously against sending a column to occupy Lạng Sơn in the heat of the Tonkin summer, he emerged unscathed from the official enquiry into the circumstances of the Bắc Lệ Ambush (June 1884).

Millot was arguably the most successful of the many commanders of the expeditionary corps, but he was unpopular with both his officers and his men, who considered him overcautious. Significantly, his decision to halt General de Négrier's pursuit of the defeated Chinese forces in the Bắc Ninh campaign was held against him, even though he had sound military reasons for this decision. The troops immediately gave sardonic Vietnamese nicknames to their three generals. The much-admired de Négrier became Maolen ('Quick!'), Brière de l'Isle Mann Mann ('Slow!'), and Millot Toi Toi ('Stop!). Millot's career in Tonkin ended on a sour note. In poor health, and dismayed at the way the French government used the Bắc Lệ ambush as a pretext for war with China, he submitted his resignation in September 1884. In his last order of the day, he described himself as 'a sick and disappointed man'.

=== General Louis-Alexandre-Esprit-Gaston Brière de l'Isle (1827–96) ===
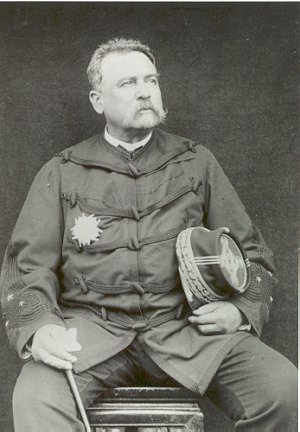
General Louis Brière de l'Isle (1827–96)

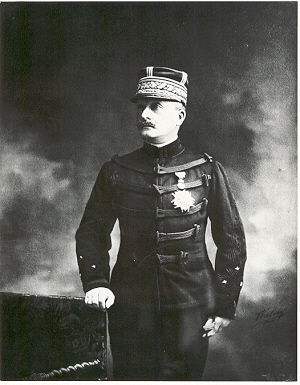
General François de Négrier (1842–1913)

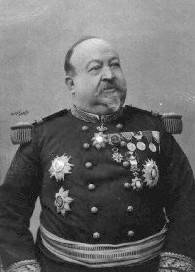
Colonel Ange-Laurent Giovanninelli (1839–1903)

Millot was replaced as general-in-chief by his senior brigade commander, Louis Brière de l'Isle. Brière de l'Isle appointed Colonel Dujardin to the interim command of the 1st Brigade during the autumn and winter of 1884. In January 1885, on the eve of the Lạng Sơn Campaign, Colonel Ange-Laurent Giovanninelli (1839–1903) arrived in Tonkin and assumed command of the 1st Brigade. General de Négrier remained in command of the 2nd Brigade.

Brière de l'Isle was a natural leader of men, and under his command the expeditionary corps achieved a high standard of professional excellence. In October 1884, in the Kep Campaign, Brière de l'Isle defeated a major Chinese invasion of the Tonkin Delta, skilfully exploiting the mobility of the French gunboats to concentrate his forces successively against both wings of the Guangxi Army. In the first fortnight of February 1885, in the Lạng Sơn Campaign, he took the expeditionary corps in triumph to Lạng Sơn. The success of the campaign owed as much to Brière de l'Isle's meticulous planning and organisation as it did to the courage and professionalism of the troops he led. In mid-February, pausing only a few days at Lạng Sơn to resupply his troops, Brière de l'Isle marched personally with Giovanninelli's 1st Brigade from Lạng Sơn back to Hanoi, and then up the Red and Clear Rivers to relieve the Siege of Tuyên Quang. Although the French suffered heavy casualties in the Battle of Hòa Mộc (2 March 1885), they captured Liu Yongfu's blocking position and broke through to Tuyên Quang. The relief of Tuyên Quang, on 3 March 1885, was the high point of Brière de l'Isle's career.

Brière de l'Isle's record of solid professional achievement was marred in the second fortnight of March 1885, with simultaneous French defeats on 24 March at the Battle of Phu Lam Tao and (far more serious) the Battle of Bang Bo. Although de Négrier retrieved his defeat at Bang Bo by inflicting crippling casualties on the Guangxi Army at the Battle of Ky Lua on 28 March, the disastrous decision by Lieutenant-Colonel Paul-Gustave Herbinger to retreat from Lạng Sơn transformed a French tactical victory into a strategic defeat. Although Brière de l'Isle soon stabilised the situation, the French had lost the hard-won gains of the February campaign. Meanwhile, Brière de l'Isle knew that he would now go down in history not as the victor of Lạng Sơn and Tuyên Quang but as the general who had sent the notorious 'Lạng Sơn telegram' that brought down the government of Jules Ferry. In later years, whenever asked about his experiences during the Sino-French War, he would reply 'Let's talk about something else. That campaign left a bitter taste in everybody's mouth!'

Strong reinforcements were sent to Tonkin in the wake of the Retreat from Lạng Sơn (March 1885), bringing the total number of French soldiers in Tonkin to 35,000 in the summer of 1885. In May and June 1885 thousands of fresh French troops poured into Tonkin, swamping the veterans of the two brigades that had fought the Sino-French War, and the expeditionary corps was reorganised into two two-brigade divisions. Brière de l'Isle was replaced in command of the expeditionary corps on 1 June 1885 by General Philippe-Marie-Henri Roussel de Courcy (1827–1887), but remained in Tonkin for several months as commander of the 1st Division of the expanded expeditionary corps. De Négrier, who had recovered from the wound he sustained at the Battle of Ky Lua (28 March 1885), was given command of the 2nd Division.

=== General Philippe-Marie-Henri Roussel de Courcy (1827–1887) ===
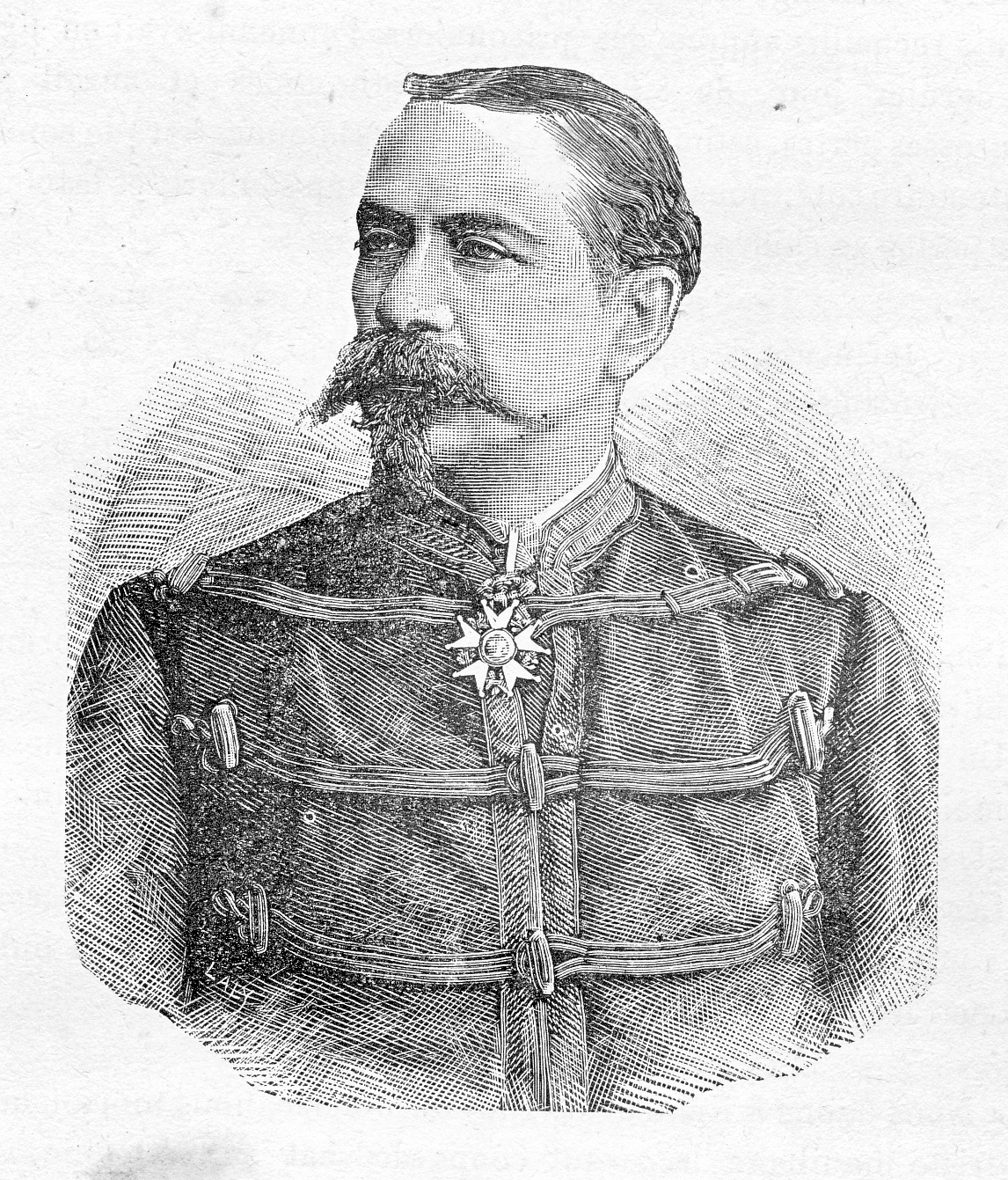
General Philippe-Marie-Henri Roussel de Courcy (1827–1887)

De Courcy's command was marked by growing resistance to French rule in Tonkin and by outright insurrection in Annam. It was also memorable for a cholera epidemic which swept through the expeditionary corps in the summer and autumn of 1885, exacerbated by de Courcy's neglect of quarantine precautions, in which more French soldiers died than in the entire nine months of the Sino-French War. Elements of the Tonkin expeditionary corps were attacked at Huế on 2 July 1885 in the so-called 'Huế Ambush', which initiated the Annamese insurrection. Forbidden by the French government to launch a full-scale invasion of Annam, de Courcy landed troops along the vulnerable coastline of central Vietnam to seize a number of strategic points and to protect Vietnamese Catholic communities in the wake of massacres of Christians by the Annamese insurgents at Quảng Ngãi and Bình Định. Key moments in de Courcy's intervention were the occupation of Vinh by Lieutenant-Colonel Chaumont in August, and the relief of Qui Nhơn and capture of Bình Định by General Prud'homme in September. In November 1885 a so-called 'Annam column' under the command of Lieutenant-Colonel Mignot set off from Ninh Bình in southern Tonkin and marched down the narrow spine of Vietnam as far as Huế, scattering any insurgent bands that attempted to dispute its progress.

In Tonkin, the expeditionary corps undertook a large-scale campaign in October 1885 to capture the Yunnan Army's old base at Thanh May on the Red River, occupied by Vietnamese insurgents under the command of Nguyễn Quang Bích since the end of the Sino-French War. De Négrier also conducted a major sweep of the Bai Sai region near Hanoi. De Courcy was warned by his senior medical officers not to mix units in which cholera had already broken out with uninfected units. He ignored this advice, with the result that there were appalling fatalities from cholera in both the Thanh May and Bai Sai columns.

=== General Charles-Auguste-Louis Warnet (1828–1913) ===
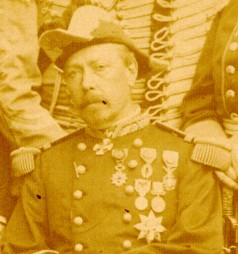
General Charles-Auguste-Louis Warnet (1828–1913)

In December 1885, disgusted with de Courcy's obtuseness, General Briere de l'Isle submitted his resignation and returned to France. Shortly afterwards de Courcy's chief of staff General Charles-Auguste-Louis Warnet (1828–1913) also asked to return to France. The army ministry belatedly realised that things were very wrong in Tonkin. It refused Warnet's resignation and instead recalled de Courcy to France on 16 January 1886. De Courcy was briefly replaced in command of the expeditionary corps by General Warnet.

Warnet, despite a wealth of evidence that Tonkin was far from pacified, was a political general. Knowing that the French public wanted to hear no more depressing news of bandits and pirates in Tonkin, he declared that Tonkin was pacified and recommended to the army ministry the formal downgrading of the expeditionary corps into a division of occupation. Some colour was given to this claim by Warnet's decision to secure the line of the Red River all the way up to the Yunnan border. In March 1886 Lieutenant-Colonel de Maussion advanced up the Red River, meeting almost no resistance, and occupied the town of Lào Cai on the Chinese border. In April 1886 the expeditionary corps was reduced to a three-brigade division of occupation under the command of General Édouard-Ferdinand Jamont (1831–1918).

== Strength, organisation and orders of battle ==
Although the Tonkin expeditionary corps eventually reached a strength of 35,000 men, it was never able to put more than a fraction of its troops into the field against the Chinese armies. Most of its men were tied down in garrison duty and in sweeps against concentrations of Vietnamese resistance fighters ('bandits' or 'pirates', as the French called them). Courbet fielded 9,000 troops during the Sơn Tây Campaign, and Millot 12,000 troops in the Bắc Ninh campaign. De Négrier commanded slightly fewer than 3,000 men during the Kep Campaign of October 1884, and Brière de l'Isle was only with difficulty able to put 7,200 men into the field in the February 1885 Lạng Sơn Campaign. De Courcy, using a sledgehammer to crack a nut, concentrated 6,000 infantry, seven artillery batteries and three squadrons of cavalry for the October 1885 Thanh May campaign.

=== Order of battle, Phủ Hoài, Palan and Sơn Tây campaigns ===
During Bouët and Courbet's tenures of command, the bulk of the expeditionary corps was drawn from the troupes de marine, as befitted a traditional colonial campaign, and the campaign was overseen by the navy ministry. During June and July 1883 the handful of marine infantry companies in Tonkin that had fought under Rivière's command at Nam Định and Paper Bridge were reinforced by an influx of marine infantry from France and New Caledonia. At the Battle of Phủ Hoài (15 August 1883), Bouët fielded three marine infantry battalions (chefs de bataillon Chevallier, Lafont and Roux), three marine artillery batteries (Captains Isoir, Dupont and Roussel), five companies of Cochinchinese tirailleurs (riflemen) and around 450 Yellow Flag auxiliaries. The battle of Palan (1 September 1883), a smaller affair, was fought by two marine infantry battalions (chefs de bataillon Berger and Roux), Roussel's battery and the Yellow Flags. The Yellow Flag auxiliaries plundered a peaceful Vietnamese village shortly after the battle, and Bouët was forced to disband them. Many of the discharged Yellow Flags promptly joined Liu Yongfu's Black Flag Army at Sơn Tây. Three months later they would be fighting against their former paymasters.

The commitment of marine infantry and marine artillery units reached a peak in the Sơn Tây Campaign (December 1883). Courbet's column included four marine infantry battalions (chefs de bataillon Roux, Chevallier, Dulieu and Reygasse) and six marine artillery batteries (Captains Isoir, Dupont, Roussel, Roperh, Péricaud and Dudraille). As often in French colonial warfare, the marsouins and bigors were supported by native auxiliaries and naval detachments. The Sơn Tây column included a Fusiliers Marins battalion (capitaine de frégate Laguerre), 800 Tonkinese tirailleurs (chef de bataillon Bertaux-Levillain), four companies of Cochinchinese tirailleurs and a 65-millimetre naval battery (lieutenant de vaisseau Amelot).

But the column also included two recently arrived Turco battalions (chefs de bataillon Jouneau and Letellier) and the 1st Foreign Legion Battalion (Lieutenant-Colonel Donnier), and the presence of Legion and Turco units at Sơn Tây was a portent of things to come. The army ministry insisted that the Tonkin campaign should be run by a general from the regular army, and Courbet was relieved of the command of the expeditionary corps on 16 December 1883 (ironically, the very day on which he captured Sơn Tây). Thereafter, the army in Algeria would supply most of the formations sent to Tonkin, and the war on land against the Black Flags and China would be run by the army ministry.

=== February 1884 reinforcements ===
In November 1883 the Chamber of Deputies approved the despatch of a further 6,500 troops to Tonkin. This was the largest single troop movement of its kind during the conflict with China. The newcomers included six fresh infantry battalions, which were grouped into two marching regiments. The first regiment, which included three line infantry battalions from France, was under the command of Lieutenant-Colonel Defoy. Its three battalions—the 23rd, 111th and 143rd—were commanded respectively by chef de bataillon Godart, Lieutenant-Colonel Chapuis and chef de bataillon Farret. The second regiment, led by Lieutenant-Colonel Jacques Duchesne of the Foreign Legion, was supplied by the 19th Army Corps in Algeria and included a Legion battalion, a Turco battalion and one of the penal African light infantry battalions. These three battalions—the 2nd Legion Battalion, the 1st Battalion, 3rd Algerian tirailleurs Regiment, and the 2nd African Battalion—were commanded respectively by chefs de bataillon Hutin, de Mibielle and Servière.

The artillery reinforcements consisted of two 80-millimetre army artillery batteries, under the command of Captains Jourdy and de Saxcé, and a battery of canons-revolvers served by sailors. A cavalry detachment of 50 chasseurs d'Afrique under the command of Captain Laperrine was also sent to give the expeditionary corps a capability for scouting and pursuit, plus a number of specialist units, including a balloon detachment (Lieutenant Jullien). A draft of nearly 200 men was also despatched to bring Donnier's Legion battalion, which had suffered heavy casualties at Sơn Tây, back up to its paper strength of 800 men.

The reinforcements sailed from France and North Africa in December 1883 and January 1884 in two convoys. On 23 December the transports Vĩnh Long, Européen, Comorin and Cholon left Toulon to embark the Legion, Turco and Bat' d'Af' reinforcements at Mers-el-Kebir and Oran. On 10 January the three line battalions, the artillery and specialist troops set sail from Toulon aboard the transports Saint-Germain, Poitou, Annamite and Mytho. Two smaller vessels, Sarthe and Shamrock, accommodated the overflow.

=== Order of battle, Bắc Ninh campaign ===
The expeditionary column that General Millot led to Bắc Ninh in March 1884 was organised into two brigades, under the respective command of Generals Louis Brière de l'Isle and François de Négrier. After making troop deductions for garrison duty, Millot was able to give each of his brigade commanders two marching regiments (régiments de marche), each containing the equivalent of three infantry battalions. Professional protocol prevented him from mixing the battalions of the marine infantry, the armée d'Afrique and the metropolitan army (armée de terre), and he was obliged to create one regiment of marine infantry, two 'Algerian' regiments of troops from the armée d'Afrique, and one French regiment. One of the 'Algerian' regiments contained the three Turco battalions then in Tonkin, the other the white formations of the Foreign Legion and African Light Infantry. These four marching regiments were commanded respectively by Lieutenant-Colonels Bertaux-Levillain, Belin, Duchesne and Defoy.

- 1st Brigade (général de brigade Louis Brière de l'Isle)
  - 1st Marching Regiment (Lieutenant-Colonel Bertaux-Levillain)
    - marine infantry battalion (chef de bataillon Reygasse)
    - marine infantry battalion (chef de bataillon Coronnat)
  - 2nd Marching Regiment (Lieutenant-Colonel Belin)
    - 1st Battalion, 3rd Algerian Tirailleur Regiment (chef de bataillon Godon)
    - 2nd Battalion, 1st Algerian Tirailleur Regiment (chef de bataillon Hessling)
    - 3rd Battalion, 3rd Algerian Tirailleur Regiment (chef de bataillon de Mibielle)
  - Fusilier-marin battalion (capitaine de frégate Laguerre)
  - Brigade artillery (chef d'escadron de Douvres)
    - 1st, 2nd and 6th Marine Artillery Batteries bis (Captains Régis, Vintemberger and Dudraille)
    - 11th Battery, 12th Army Artillery Regiment (Captain Jourdy)
    - naval artillery battery, corps de débarquement.
- 2nd Brigade (général de brigade François de Négrier)
  - 3rd Marching Regiment (Lieutenant-Colonel Defoy)
    - 23rd Line Infantry Battalion (chef de bataillon Godart)
    - 111th Line Infantry Battalion (Lieutenant-Colonel Chapuis)
    - 143rd Line Infantry Battalion (chef de bataillon Farret)
  - 4th Marching Regiment (Lieutenant-Colonel Duchesne)
    - 1st Foreign Legion Battalion (chef de bataillon Donnier)
    - 2nd Foreign Legion Battalion (chef de bataillon Hutin)
    - 2nd African Light Infantry Battalion (chef de bataillon Servière)
  - fusilier-marin battalion (capitaine de frégate de Beaumont)
  - Brigade artillery (chef d'escadron Chapotin)
    - 3rd and 4th Marine Artillery Batteries bis (Captains Roussel and Roperh)
    - 12th Battery, 12th Army Artillery Regiment (Captain de Saxcé)
    - naval artillery half-battery, corps de débarquement.

=== Order of battle, Lạng Sơn and Tuyên Quang campaigns ===
During the Lạng Sơn Campaign (February 1885) and the campaigns of March 1885 around Tuyên Quang and Lạng Sơn, both brigades of the expeditionary corps contained two marching regiments (régiments de marche), each of two or three battalions, with supporting artillery, Tonkinese skirmishers and field hospital and engineering detachments. Giovanninelli's 1st Brigade consisted of a two-battalion marine infantry regiment, a two-battalion regiment of Algerian tirailleurs (Turcos), a battalion of Tonkinese tirailleurs and three artillery batteries. De Négrier's 2nd Brigade consisted of a 'French' regiment of three line infantry battalions from the metropolitan army, an 'Algerian' regiment of two Foreign Legion battalions and one battalion of African Light Infantry, a battalion of Tonkinese tirailleurs and three artillery batteries:

- 1st Brigade (Colonel Ange-Laurent Giovanninelli)
  - 1st Marching Regiment (Lieutenant-Colonel Chaumont)
    - marine infantry battalion (chef de bataillon Mahias)
    - marine infantry battalion (chef de bataillon Lambinet)
  - 2nd Marching Regiment (Lieutenant-Colonel Letellier)
    - 3rd Battalion, 3rd Algerian Tirailleur Regiment (chef de bataillon de Mibielle)
    - 4th Battalion, 1st Algerian Tirailleur Regiment (chef de bataillon Comoy)
  - 1st Battalion, 2nd Tonkinese Tirailleur Regiment (chef de bataillon Tonnot)
  - Brigade artillery (chef d'escadron Levrard)
    - 3rd, 4th and 5th Marine Artillery Batteries bis (Captains Roussel, Roperh and Péricaud).
- 2nd Brigade (général de brigade François de Négrier)
  - 3rd Marching Regiment (Lieutenant-Colonel Herbinger)
    - 23rd Line Infantry Battalion (Lieutenant-Colonel Godart)
    - 111th Line Infantry Battalion (chef de bataillon Faure)
    - 143rd Line Infantry Battalion (chef de bataillon Farret)
  - 4th Marching Regiment (Lieutenant-Colonel Donnier)
    - 2nd Foreign Legion Battalion (chef de bataillon Diguet)
    - 3rd Foreign Legion Battalion (Lieutenant-Colonel Schoeffer)
    - 2nd African Light Infantry Battalion (chef de bataillon Servière)
  - 1st Battalion, 1st Tonkinese Tirailleur Regiment (chef de bataillon Jorna de Lacale)
  - Brigade artillery (chef d'escadron de Douvres)
    - 1st Marine Artillery Battery bis (Captain Martin)
    - 11th and 12th Batteries, 12th Army Artillery Regiment (Captains Jourdy and de Saxcé).

The artillery complements of the two brigades were reorganised before the 1st Brigade left Lạng Sơn to relieve the Siege of Tuyên Quang. Roussel and Roperh's batteries were left at Lạng Sơn, and Jourdy's battery was transferred to the 1st Brigade.

=== March 1885 reinforcements ===
In March 1885 the expeditionary corps was reinforced by two battalions of zouaves (chefs de bataillon Mignot and Simon), under the overall command of Lieutenant-Colonel Callet, a third Algerian Tirailleur battalion, an army artillery battery (Captain Gradoz), and two squadrons of spahis (Captains Pfeiffer and Marochetti). Mignot's zouave battalion was defeated at the Battle of Phu Lam Tao on 23 March. Pfeiffer's spahi squadron joined the 2nd Brigade during the retreat from Lạng Sơn, and was forbidden by the acting brigade commander, Lieutenant-Colonel Herbinger, to charge a small party of Chinese skirmishers at Pho Cam.

=== June 1885 reinforcements ===
In April 1885 the French government responded to the news of the Retreat from Lạng Sơn by arranging for reinforcements of just under 8,000 men to be dispatched to Tonkin. It decided to bring the three depleted French line battalions up to their proper strength of just over 3,000 men by calling for volunteers from the classes of 1881 and 1882 from all the line regiments in the metropolitan army. This appeal produced just under 1,700 officers and soldiers, more than doubling the existing strength of the French marching regiment. Meanwhile, the armée d'Afrique was asked to furnish just under 4,000 men in fresh drafts from its zouave, Turco, Legion and African light infantry battalions. It was also asked to send a third zouave battalion under the command of chef de bataillon Hubert Metzinger to Tonkin, and to provide a squadron of spahis and a half-squadron of chasseurs d'Afrique to swell the meagre cavalry contingent of the expeditionary corps. Five army artillery batteries and one marine artillery battery (around 30 guns and 1,400 men) were also earmarked for Tonkin.

=== Deployment of 1st and 2nd Divisions, June 1885 ===
With the arrival of these reinforcements from France in June 1885, the expanded expeditionary corps was a formidable force on paper. Four Turco battalions, three zouave battalions, two marine infantry battalions, four Foreign Legion battalions, three line infantry battalions, two zéphyr battalions and seven Tonkinese Tirailleur battalions, plus supporting artillery, cavalry and engineer units, were grouped into four brigades deployed around the strategic locations in the Delta:

1st Division (General Brière de l'Isle), at Hanoi

- 1st Brigade (General Jamais), at Sơn Tây
  - 1st Marching Regiment (Colonel Mourlan)
  - 2nd Marching Regiment (Lieutenant-Colonel Callet)
- 2nd Brigade (General Munier), at Hanoi
  - 3rd Marching Regiment (Lieutenant-Colonel Chaumont)
  - 1st Tonkinese Tirailleur Regiment (Colonel de Maussion)

2nd Division (General de Négrier), at Haiphong

- 3rd Brigade (General Giovanninelli), at Phu Lang Thuong
  - 4th Marching Regiment (Colonel Donnier)
  - 2 African Light Infantry battalions
- 4th Brigade (General Prud'homme), at Dap Cau
  - 5th Marching Regiment (Colonel Godart)
  - 2nd Tonkinese Tirailleur Regiment (Lieutenant-Colonel Berger).

=== 3rd Division ===
A reserve 3rd Division of 9,000 men was assembled at Pas de Lanciers near Marseilles in April 1885, in case the Chinese showed any reluctance to implement the provisions of the recently signed peace protocol. The 3rd Division, under the command of General Coiffé, consisted of two brigades, each of two line infantry regiments and a battalion of chasseurs à pied. The division's 1st Brigade (General de Pereira) consisted of the 47th Infantry Regiment (from Saint-Malo), the 62nd Infantry Regiment (from Lorient) and the 22nd Battalion, chasseurs à pied (from Morlaix). The 2nd Brigade (General de Sermensan) consisted of the 63rd Infantry Regiment (from Limoges), the 123rd Infantry Regiment (from La Rochelle) and the 28th Battalion, chasseurs à pied (from Bayonne). The division was struck by an epidemic of typhoid fever and had to evacuate its camps. Had its men ever been sent to Tonkin, they would probably have suffered a high mortality rate. In the event, China punctiliously implemented the terms of the peace settlement, and the division was broken up in late June 1885.

== Marine infantry companies in Tonkin, 1883–1886 ==
The following table lists all marine infantry companies known to have served in Tonkin between April 1882 and April 1886. Six companies of the 2nd Marine Infantry Regiment were detached from the Tonkin expeditionary corps in September 1884 to take part in the Keelung Campaign in northern Formosa. Officers killed in action are marked (†).

Regiment	Company	Officers	Campaigns and engagements
1st Marine Infantry Regiment	25th Company	Captain Poulnot, Captain Chanu†, Captain Tailland†	Battle of Phủ Hoài, Sơn Tây Campaign, Battle of Yu Oc, Battle of Núi Bop, Lạng Sơn Campaign, Battle of Hòa Mộc
	28th Company	Captain Boulle, Captain Herbin	Sơn Tây Campaign, Battle of Yu Oc, Battle of Hòa Mộc
	29th Company	Captain Durruthy, Captain Salles	Sơn Tây Campaign, Battle of Núi Bop, Lạng Sơn Campaign, Battle of Hòa Mộc
	34th Company	Captain Larivière, Captain Hougnon	Battle of Phủ Hoài, Battle of Núi Bop, Lạng Sơn Campaign, Battle of Hòa Mộc
	36th Company	Captain Lombard, Captain Bourguignon†	Battle of Phủ Hoài, Battle of Núi Bop, Lạng Sơn Campaign, Battle of Hòa Mộc
2nd Marine Infantry Regiment	21st Company	Captain Bauche	Sơn Tây Campaign, Keelung Campaign
	22nd Company	Captain Cuny, Captain Thirion	Sơn Tây Campaign, Keelung Campaign
	23rd Company	Captain Leverger	Sơn Tây Campaign, Keelung Campaign
	24th Company	Captain Lacroix, Captain Onffroy de la Rozière	Keelung Campaign
	25th Company	Captain Amouroux, Captain Logos	Keelung Campaign, Pescadores Campaign
	26th Company	Lieutenant Goldschoen, Captain Doucet, Captain Bertin, Captain Harlay	Battle of Phủ Hoài, Battle of Palan, Keelung Campaign, Pescadores Campaign
	27th Company	Captain Guérin de Fontjoyeux, Captain Cramoisy	Battle of Phủ Hoài, Battle of Palan, Keelung Campaign, Pescadores Campaign
	29th Company	Captain Retrouvey, Captain Jay	Battle of Phủ Hoài
	30th Company	Captain Le Boulaire, Captain Vaillance	Keelung Campaign, Pescadores Campaign
	31st Company	Captain Caboureau	Battle of Gia Cuc, Battle of Paper Bridge
	33rd Company	Captain Trilha	Battle of Phủ Hoài
3rd Marine Infantry Regiment	21st Company	Captain Buquet	Capture of Nam Định, Battle of Phủ Hoài, Bắc Lệ ambush
	22nd Company	Captain Jeannin†	Capture of Nam Định, Bắc Lệ ambush
	23rd Company	Captain Penther	Capture of Nam Định, Bắc Lệ ambush
	24th Company	Captain Jacquin†	Battle of Paper Bridge
	26th Company	Captain Poisot	Sơn Tây Campaign
	29th Company	Captain Noble	Sơn Tây Campaign
	33rd Company	Captain Trilha	Sơn Tây Campaign
4th Marine Infantry Regiment	25th Company	Captain Drouin	Battle of Phủ Hoài, Battle of Palan
	26th Company	Captain Taccoën, Captain Bécourt	Battle of Phủ Hoài, Battle of Palan
	27th Company	Captain Lancelot	Capture of Nam Định, Battle of Palan
	30th Company	Captain Martellière	Battle of Gia Cuc, Battle of Phủ Hoài
	31st Company	Captain Guilloteaux	Capture of Nam Định

== Officers killed in action ==
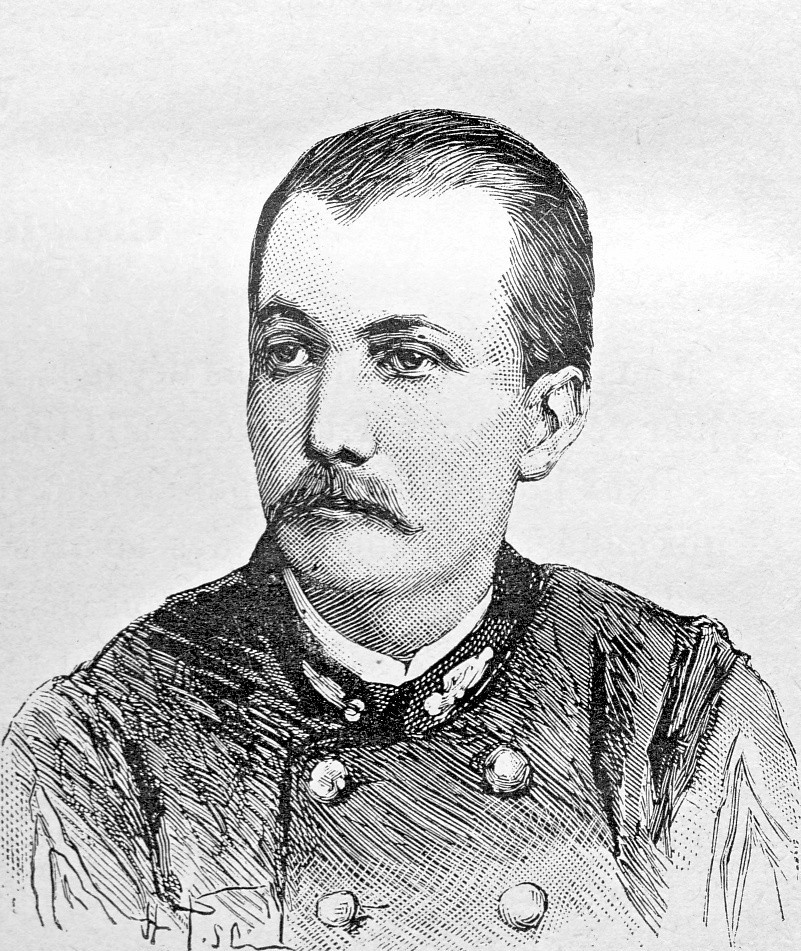
Captain Gravereau, 2nd Legion Battalion (Tay Hoa, 4 February 1885)

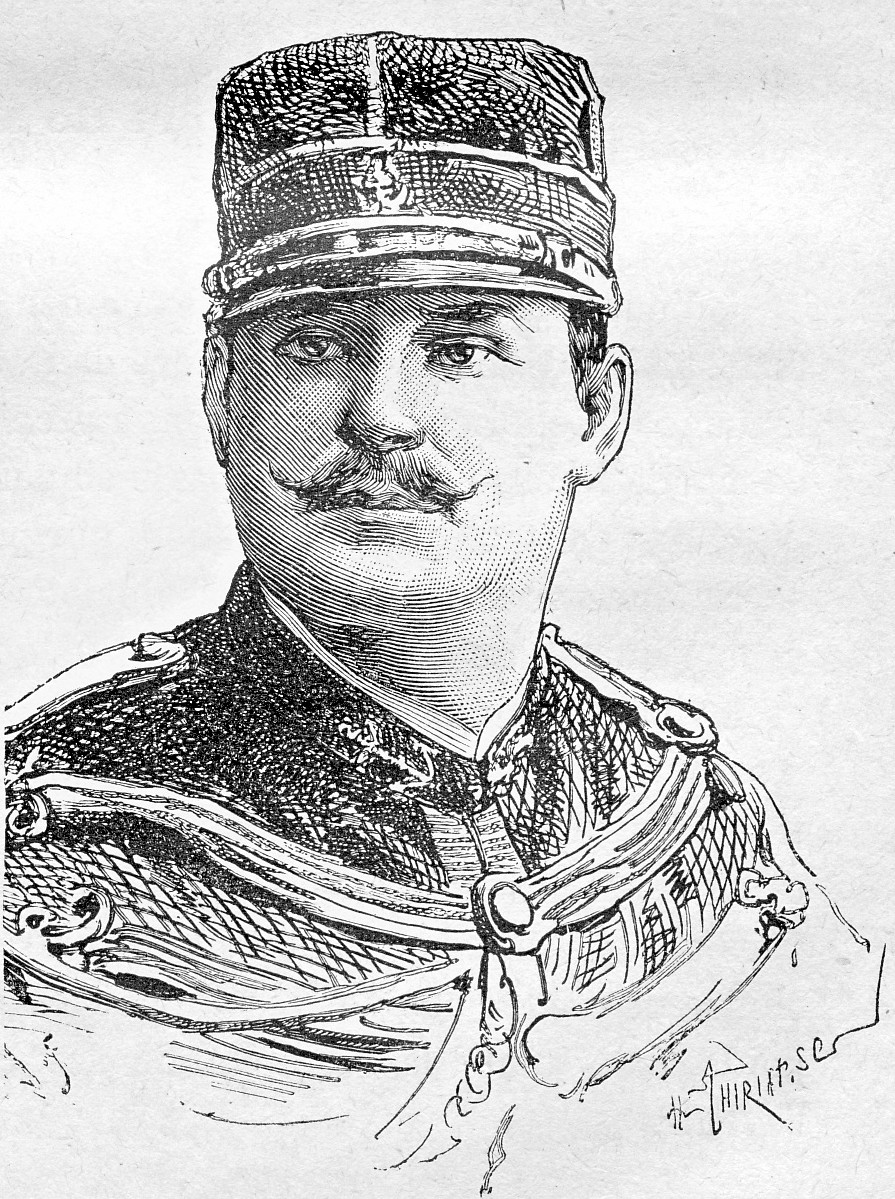
2nd Lieutenant Bossant, marine infantry (Bac Vie, 12 February 1885)

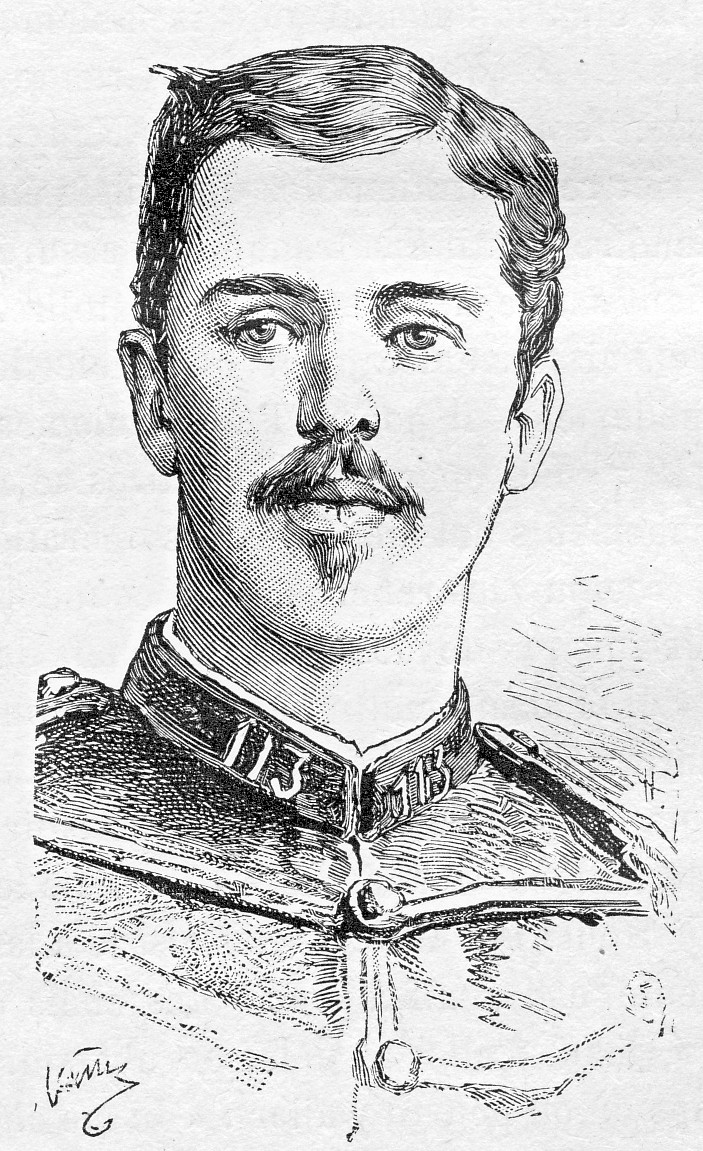
2nd Lieutenant Émile Portier, 111th Line Battalion (Dong Dang, 23 February 1885)

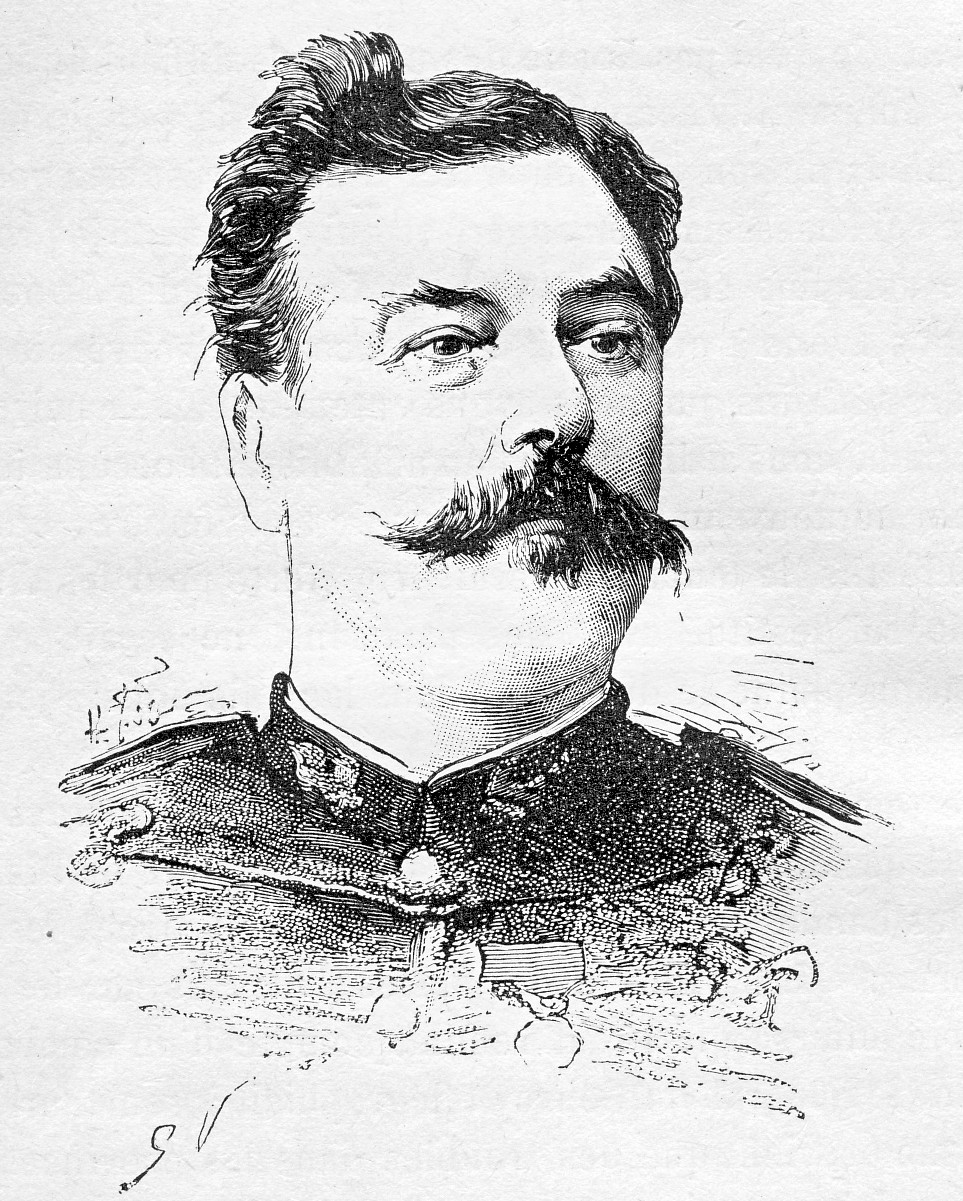
Captain Tailland, marine infantry (Hòa Mộc, 2 March 1885)

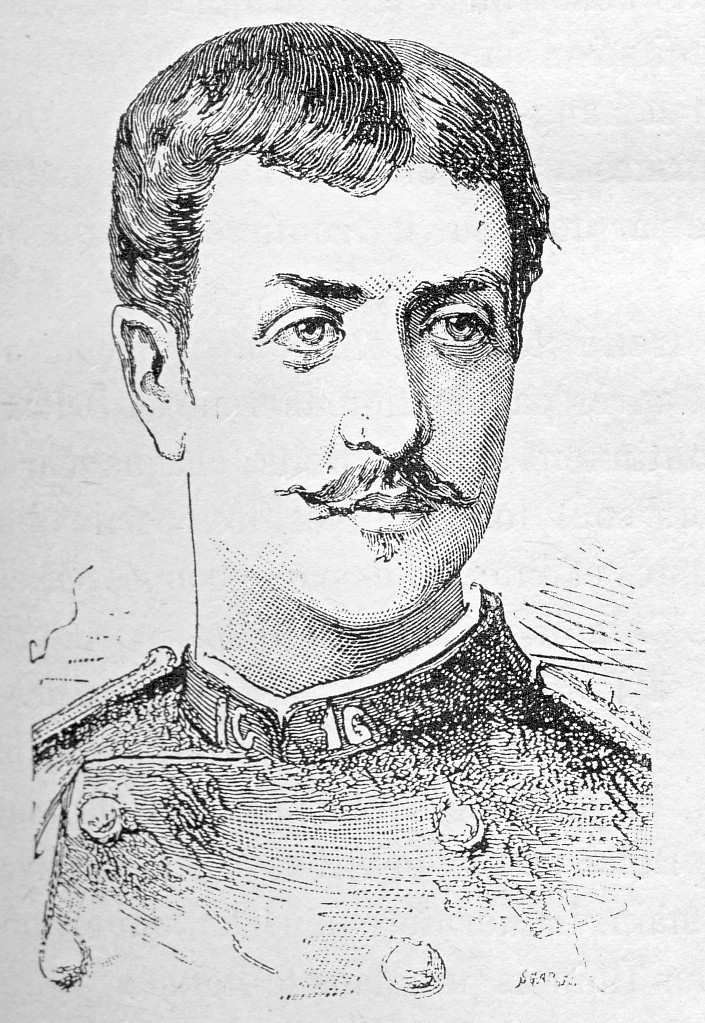
2nd Lieutenant Rene Normand, 111th Line Battalion (Bang Bo, 24 March 1885)

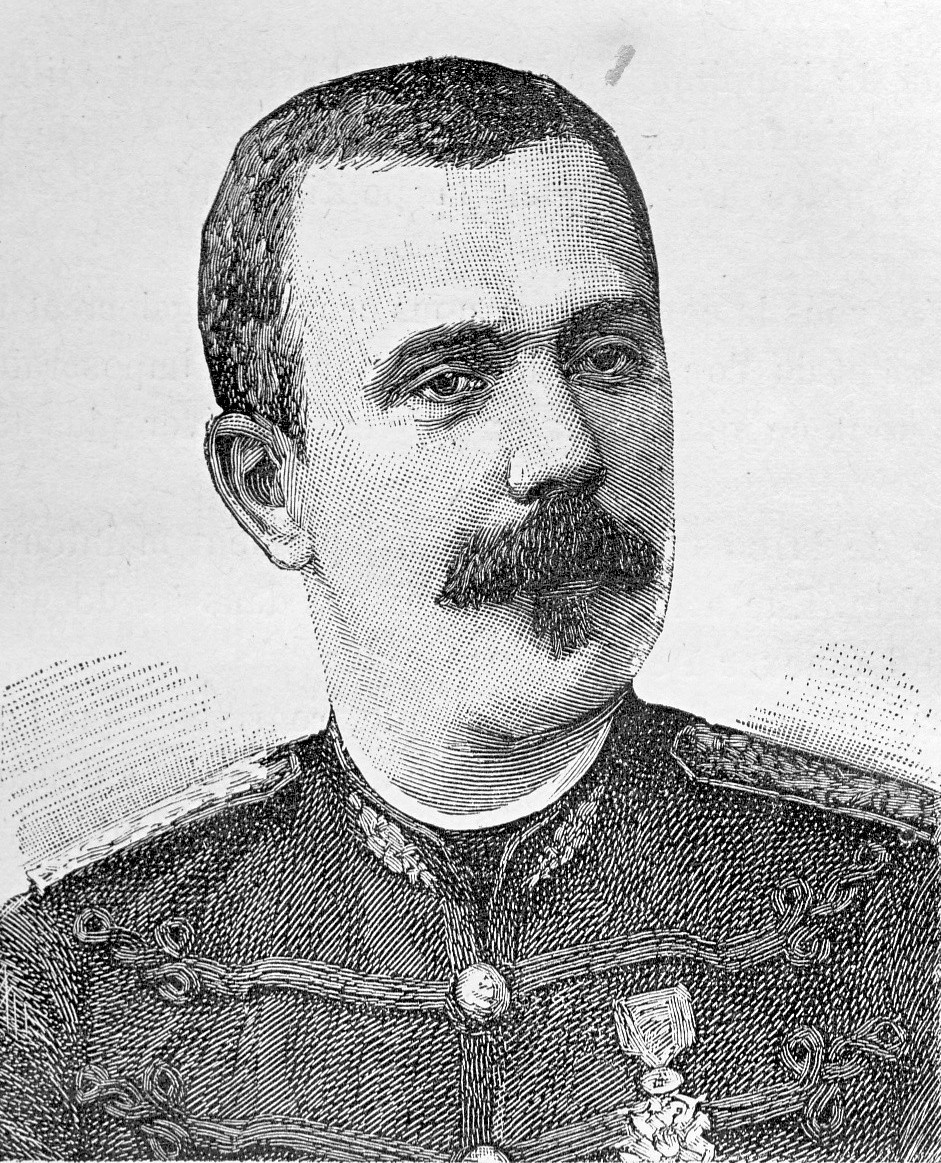
Doctor Raynaud, 111th Line Battalion (Bang Bo, 24 March 1885)

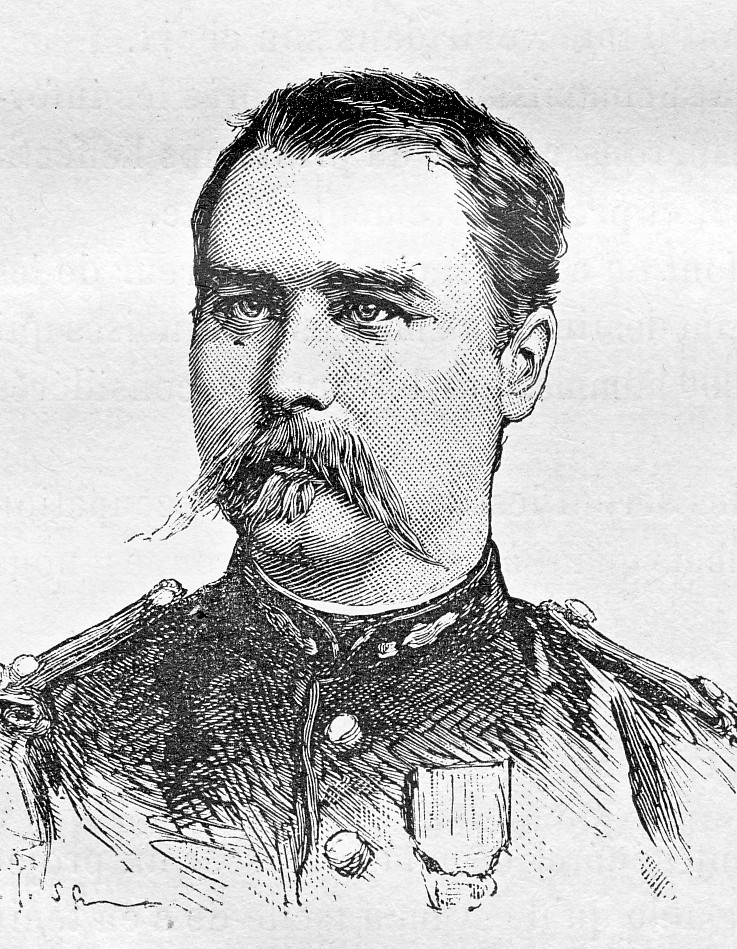
Captain Cotter, 2nd Legion Battalion (Bang Bo, 24 March 1885)

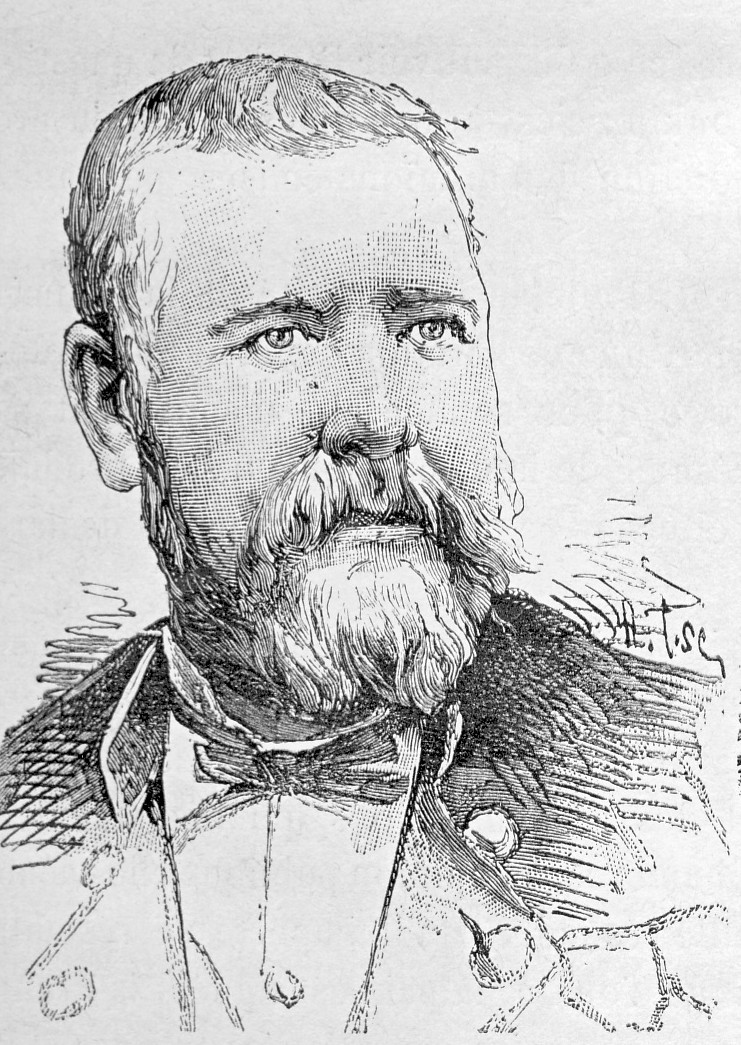
Captain Brunet, 3rd Legion Battalion (Bang Bo, 24 March 1885)

== Soldiers of the expeditionary corps, 1884 ==
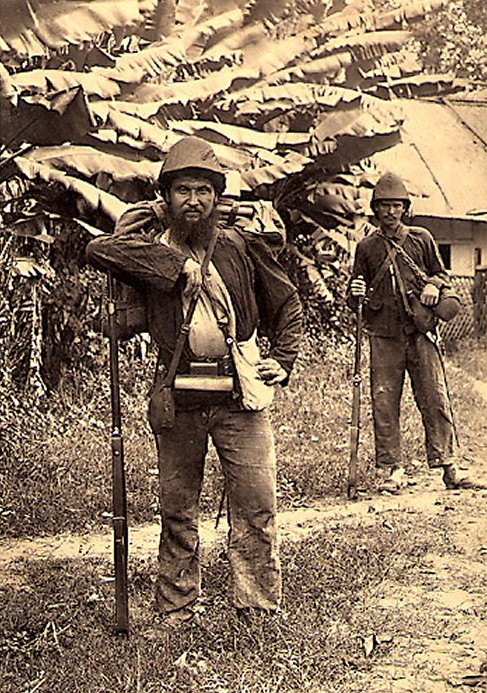
Marine infantrymen

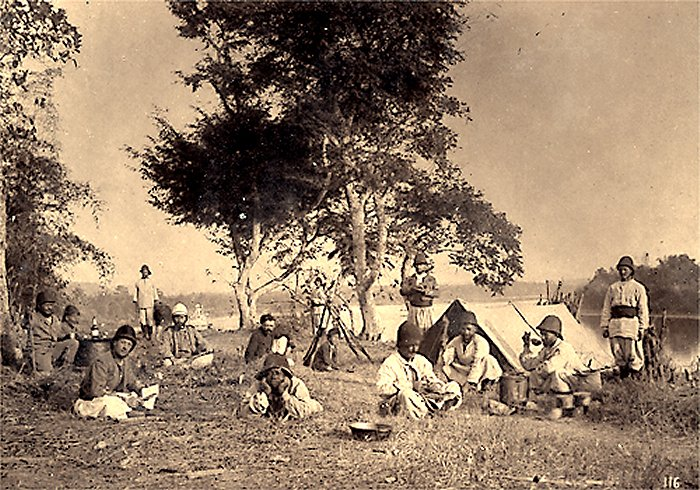
Algerian riflemen

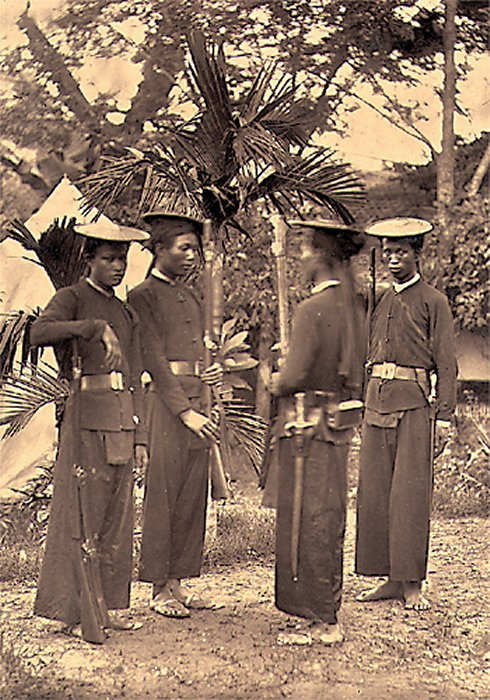
Tonkinese riflemen

== Uniforms of the expeditionary corps, 1884–5 ==
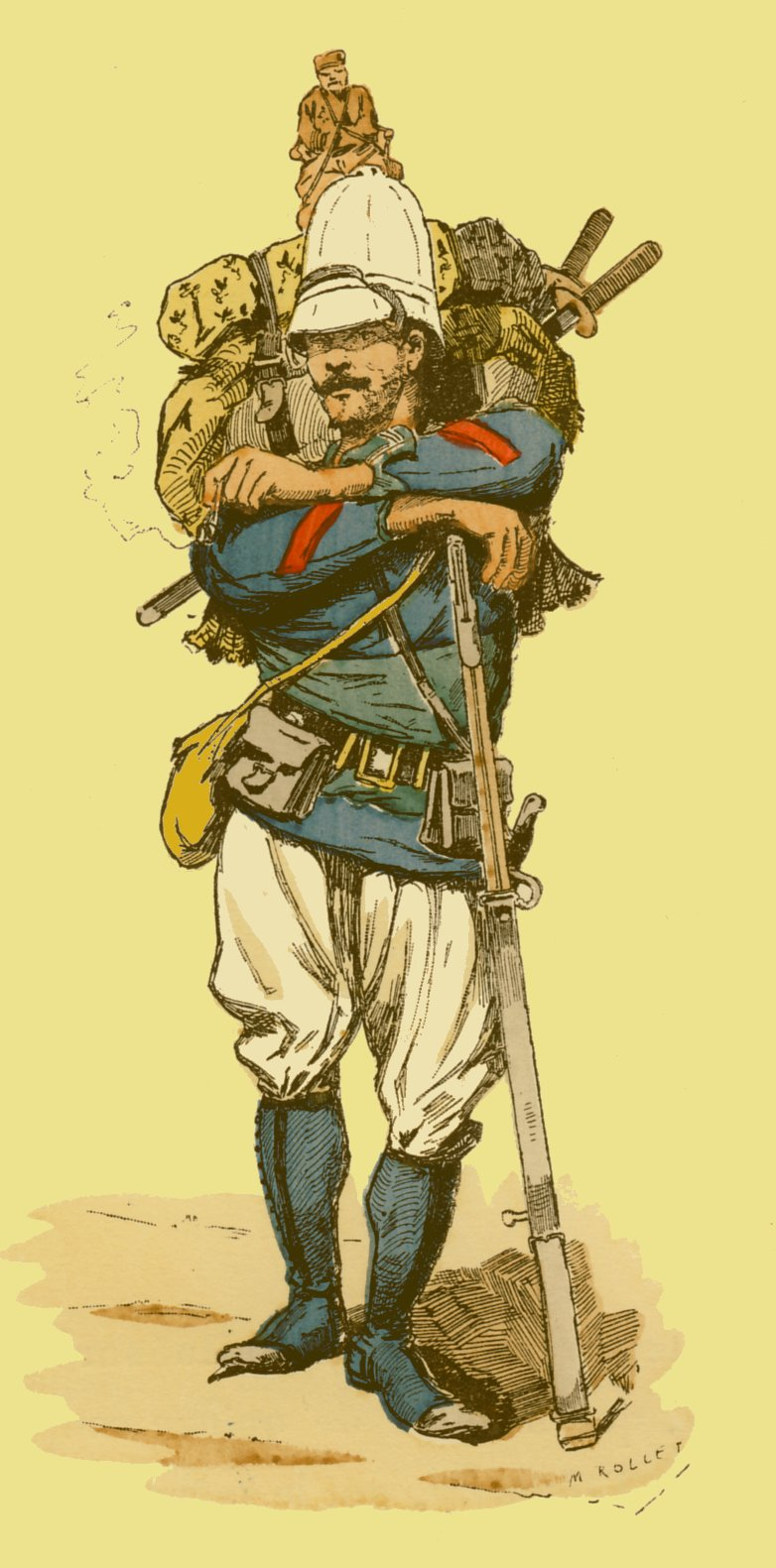
Marine infantryman

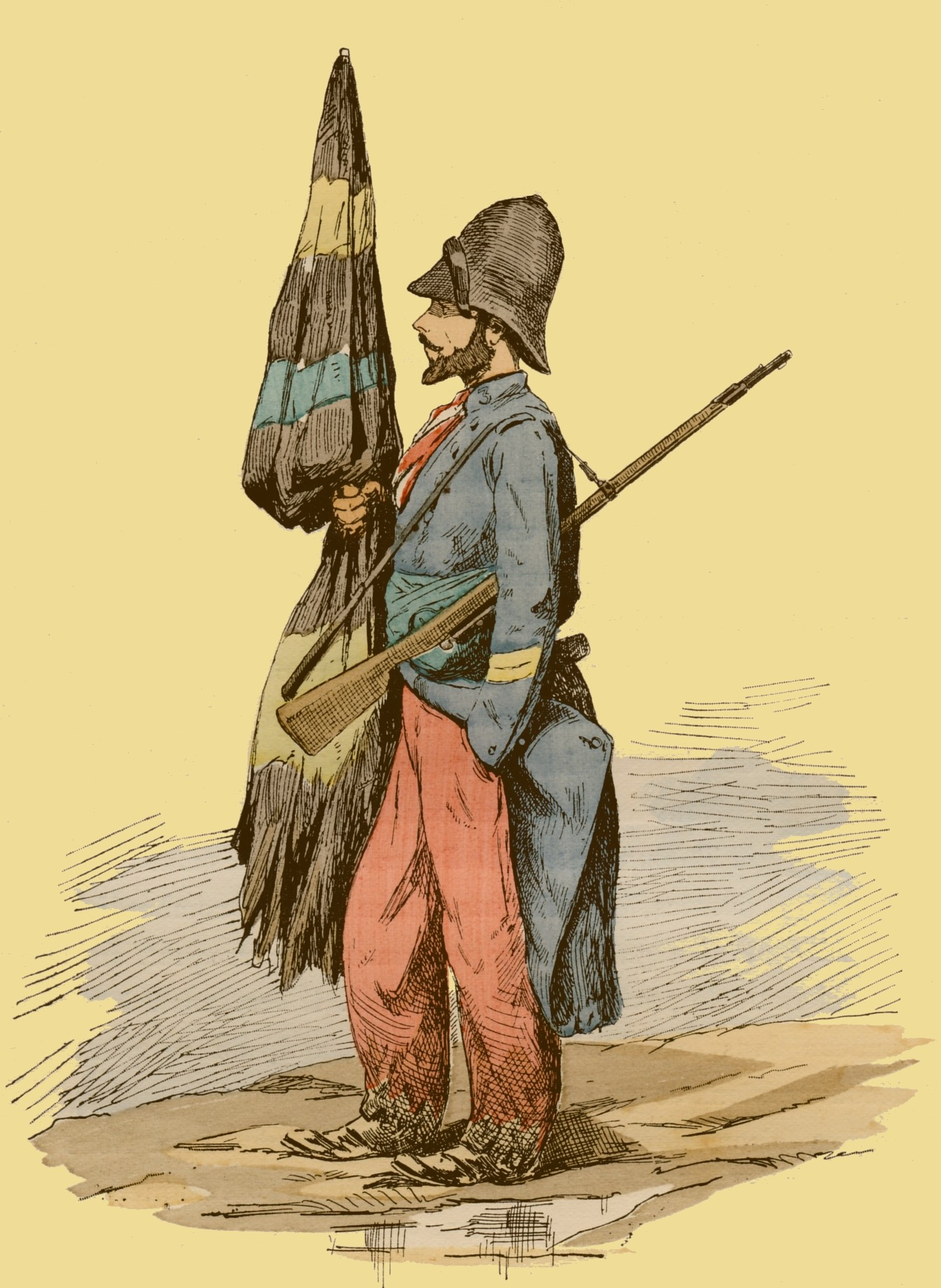
Legionnaire

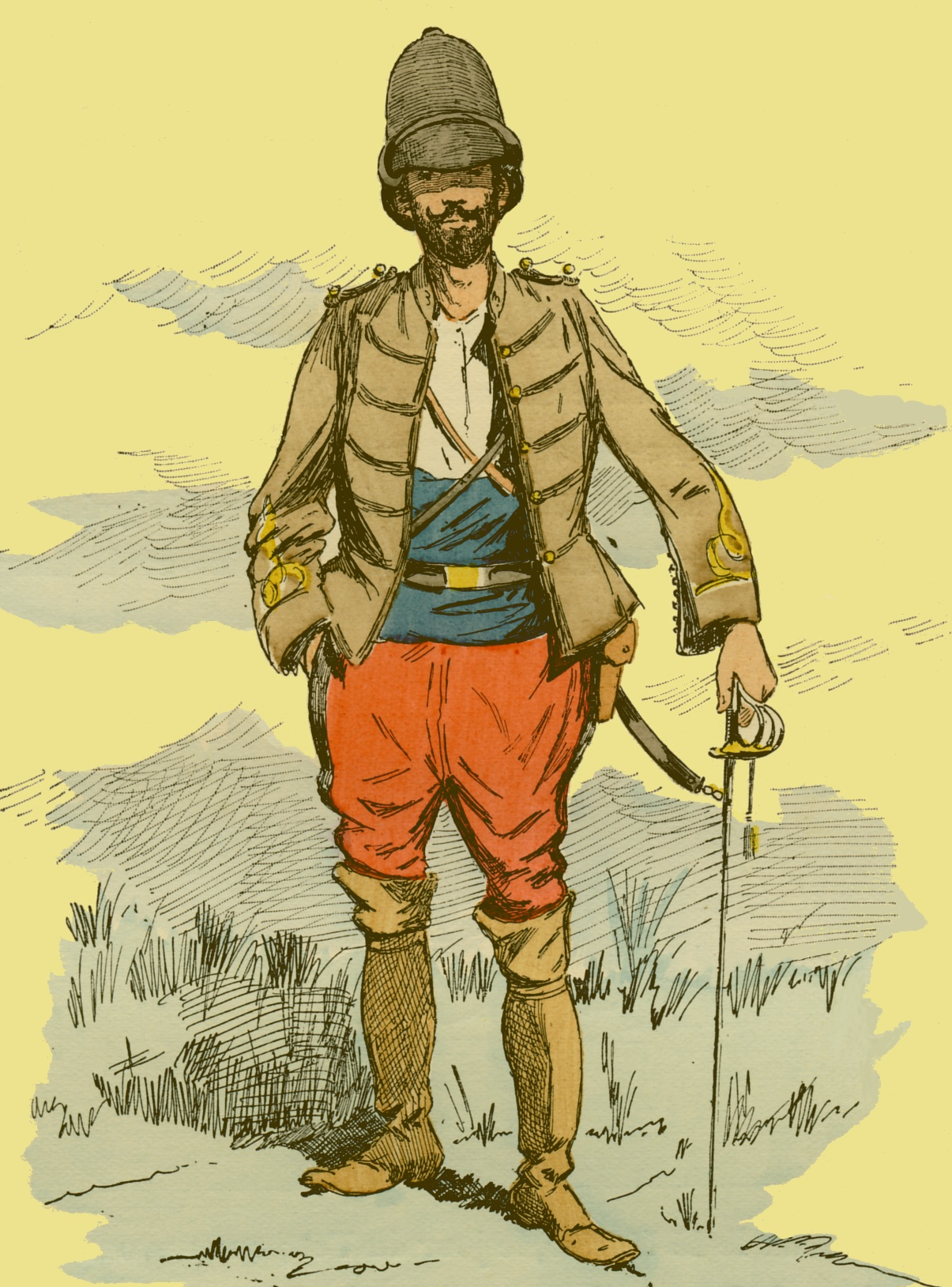
Zouave officer
