= Battle of Phu Lam Tao =

1885 battle of the Sino-French War

- Part of the Sino-French War, Tonkin campaign
Date	23 March 1885
Location	near Hưng Hóa, northern Vietnam
Result	Chinese victory

Belligerents
France	China; Black Flag Army

Commanders and leaders
(French Third Republic) Chef de bataillon Simon	(Qing dynasty) Unknown; Unknown

Strength
1,000 men	Unknown

Casualties and losses
40–50 killed and wounded	Unknown

The Battle of Phu Lam Tao (23 March 1885) was a politically significant engagement during the Sino-French War (August 1884 – April 1885), in which a French Zouave battalion was defeated by a mixed force of Chinese soldiers and Black Flags.

== Background ==
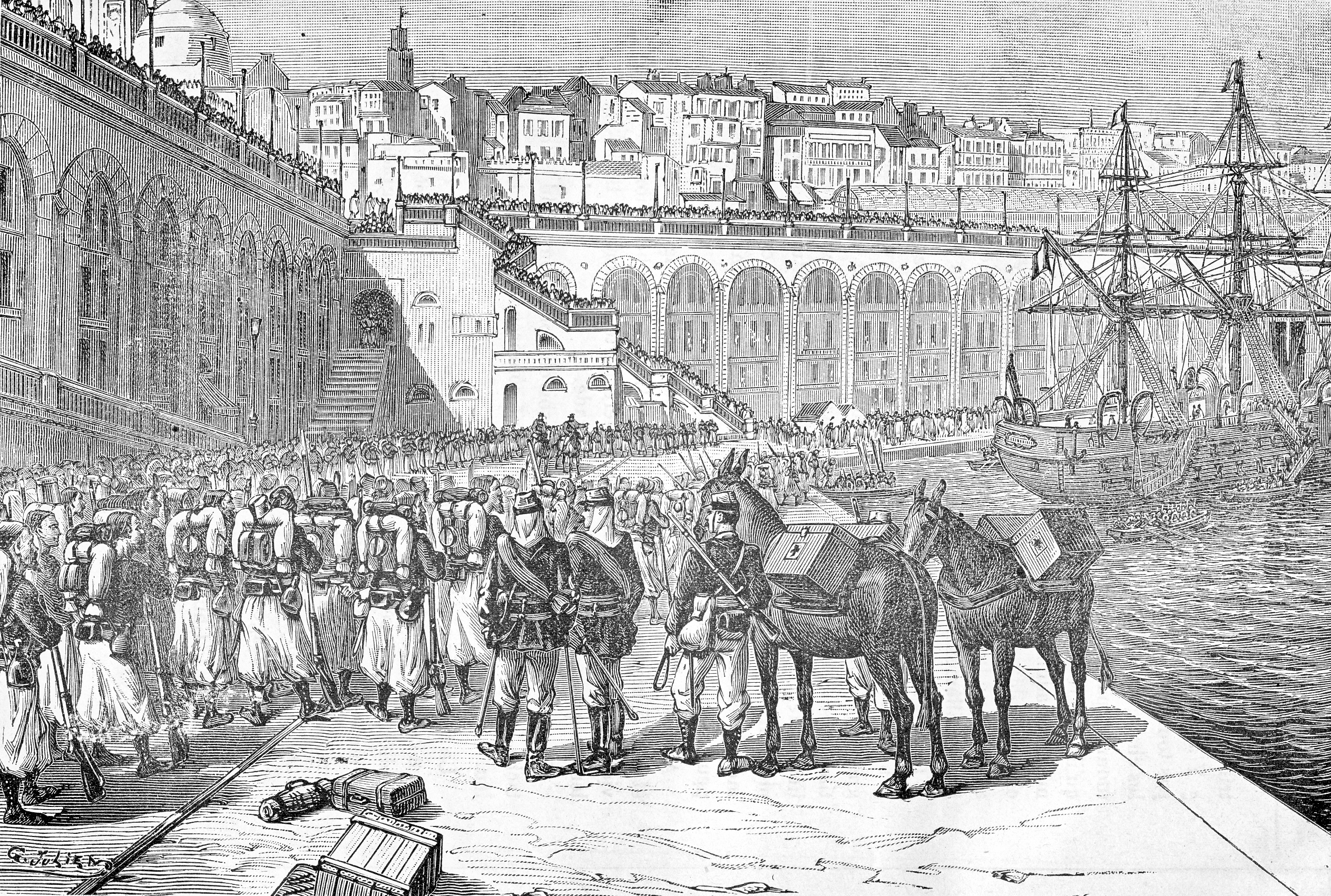
Zouaves embarking at Algiers for Tonkin, January 1885

The battle took place three weeks after the end of the Siege of Tuyên Quang, in the course of a French reconnaissance of positions occupied by troops of Tang Jingsong's Yunnan Army and Liu Yongfu's Black Flag Army. French accounts of the battle are curiously reticent, suggesting that things had gone badly wrong. In the wake of the relief of Tuyên Quang, General Louis Brière de l'Isle, the general-in-chief of the Tonkin Expeditionary Corps, drew up plans for a campaign against the Yunnan Army by a column of 5,000 French and Algerian troops, 2,000 Tonkinese auxiliaries and 460 mules and horses. The campaign would be launched from the major French base at Hưng Hóa. Chef de bataillon Simon's 1st Battalion, 1st Zouave Regiment, which had only recently arrived in Tonkin, was ordered to make a preliminary reconnaissance of the village of Phu Lam Tao, reported to have been occupied by strong elements of the Yunnan Army. On 23 March 1885, Simon reached Phu Lam Tao and discovered that the village was held by a force of Yunnan regulars and Black Flags ("pirates", as the French called them). Simon ordered his battalion to attack.

== The battle ==
What happened next is difficult to establish, as the French sources skate over the engagement in silence or make only the barest of allusions to it. Agence Havas, the official French news agency, announced merely that Simon's battalion had made a reconnaissance towards Phu Lam Tao and had suffered several casualties, but there was clearly more to the affair than that. It is certain that the zouave battalion attacked Phu Lam Tao and was repulsed, and very likely that the repulse was ignominious. The fullest account of the action was given by Paul Sainmont, an officer in chef de bataillon Mignot's battalion of the 2nd Zouave Regiment, which had accompanied Simon's battalion to Tonkin:

Today the 1st Battalion, 1st Zouave Regiment was at grips with the soldiers of Luu Vinh Phuc in the Thanh May district near the village of Bang Huyen.

The pirates arrived there in bands chased from Lang Son by de Négrier and from Tuyen Quang by Brière de l'Isle, to concentrate on this point. Our comrades fought furiously all the evening of 23 March, and after nightfall the garrison of Hung Hoa, which was watching this spectacle from the top of the citadel, saw the glare from the flames which were devouring two or three neighbouring villages, and could guess that action had been joined on a fairly wide front.

The zouaves did not lack energy or bravery, but night came on and the enemy was now in too great numbers. They were forced to regain their cantonments on the left bank of the Red River, in good order, having vainly made several furious assaults on the fortified pagoda of Bang Huyen under an extremely murderous fire.

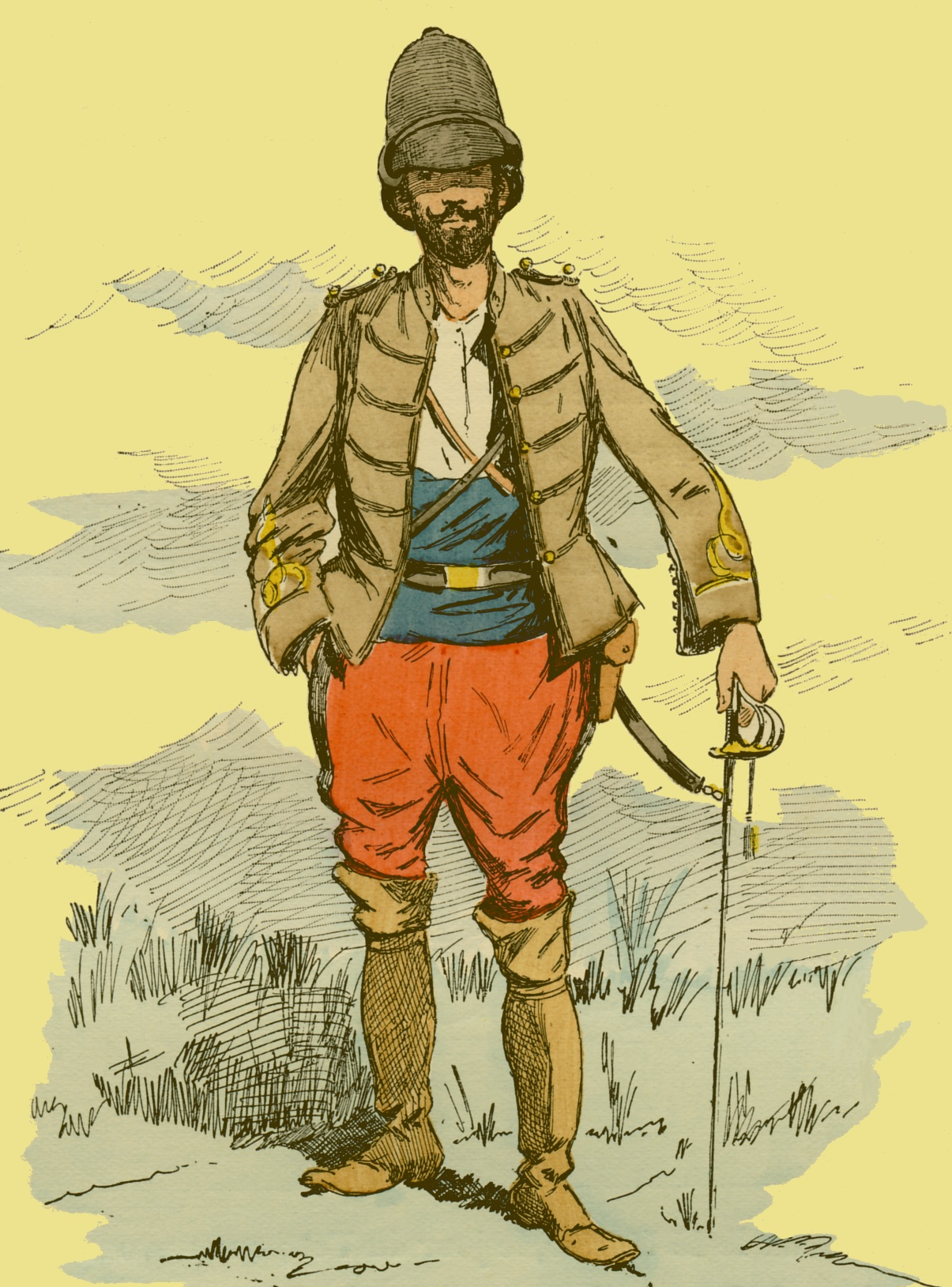
French Zouave officer in Tonkin in Spring of 1885

According to Lieutenant-Colonel Bonifacy, who discussed the battle years later with officers who had been present, the troops fell back in disorder, throwing away their haversacks and rifles. Bonifacy commented that the Zouaves, fresh from Algeria, should not have been given such a mission until they had acclimatised themselves to conditions of war in Tonkin. The Chinese sources claim that the Yunnan Army and the Black Flags won a clear victory at Phu Lam Tao. According to the Yunnan Army's official report, its forces at Phu Lam Tao were attacked by the French on 23 March, the attack was defeated, and the French abandoned their dead on the battlefield and retreated in panic into the jungle. The report added that the French retired from the area on 24 March, abandoning 400 uniforms and quantities of weapons and maps.

== Casualties ==
The casualties suffered by the French in this action are disputed. According to Lecomte, who dismissed the affair as an unimportant skirmish, Simon's battalion suffered 'around a dozen' casualties. According to Sainmont, French casualties were around 40 to 50 dead and wounded. According to Nimier, French casualties were 6 dead and 29 wounded. Nimier's figures were accepted several decades later by Thomazi, the historian of the French conquest of Indochina.

== Significance ==
The significance of the engagement at Phu Lam Tao was that it took place one day before General Oscar de Négriers heavy defeat on 24 March 1885 at the Battle of Bang Bo by the Guangxi Army. The coincidence led Brière de l'Isle to conclude, wrongly, that the French were facing a concerted offensive by both Chinese armies. This conclusion helped to set the pessimistic tone of his notorious "Lạng Sơn telegram" of 28 March 1885, despatched in the wake of Lieutenant-Colonel Paul-Gustave Herbinger's Retreat from Lạng Sơn, which toppled the government of Jules Ferry in the Tonkin Affair and brought the Sino-French War to a speedy end in circumstances of considerable embarrassment for France. The Thanh May district remained in the hands of Vietnamese bandit concentrations until October 1885, when General Roussel de Courcy, who succeeded Brière de l'Isle in command of the Tonkin Expeditionary Corps in May 1885, mounted a large-scale attack on their positions with 5,000 French troops, driving the bandits back up the Red River to Thanh Quan.
