= Wang Debang =

Chinese general of the Hunan Army

Wang Debang 王德榜
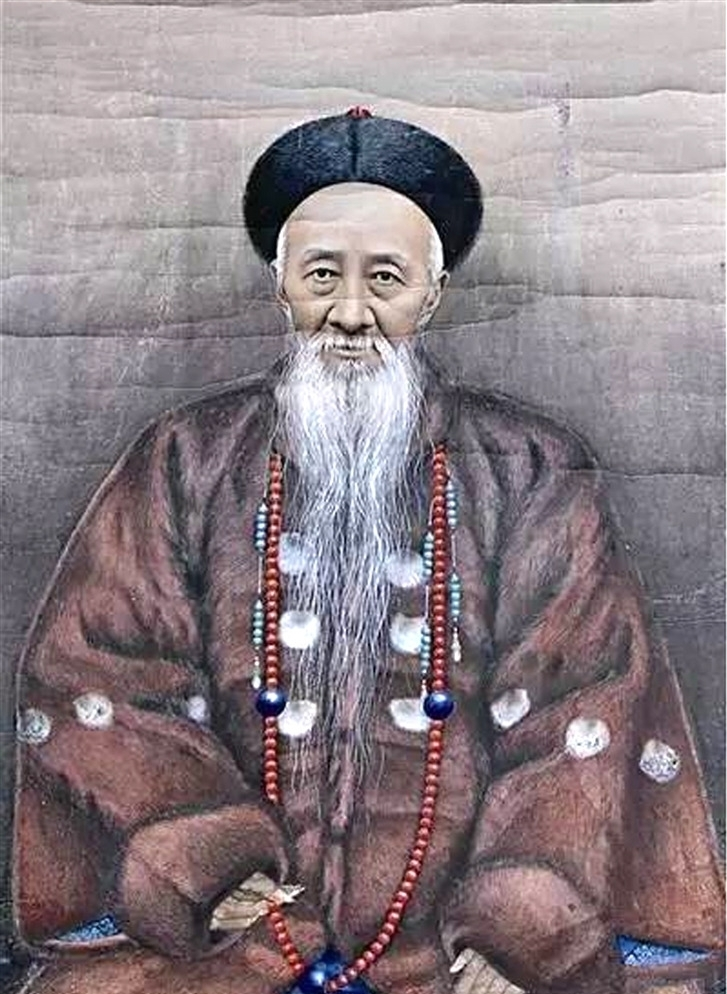
- Born: 1837; Jianghua County, Hunan, China
- Died: 1893 (aged 56)
- Military career
- Allegiance: China
- Branch: Xiang Army
- Rank: General
- Service number: 1851 – 1893
- Conflicts: Taiping Rebellion; Dungan Revolt (1862–1877); Tonkin campaign and Sino-French War: Kép campaign; Bắc Lệ ambush; Battle of Núi Bop; Battle of Zhennan Pass

Wang Debang, courtesy name Langqing was a Chinese general of the Hunan Army during the late Qing Dynasty who was most notable for his service in the Sino-French War.

== Biography ==
Wang was born on Jianghua County, Hunan as his father was a businessman around the area. He joined the Hunan Army in his early years to suppress the Taiping Rebellion. He later followed Zuo Zongtang to reclaim Xinjiang. In 1884, during the Sino-French War, he was transferred to Guangxi and recruited eight new battalions, known as the Dingbian Army. Together with Feng Zicai, he won at the Battle of Zhennan Pass in February 1885 and became a national hero; however, he was implicated in Li Hongzhang's political struggle with the Left, and his official career was suppressed by Li Hongzhang for nearly two years. He was promoted to a high-ranking official in Peking and died during his tenure.
