= Kép campaign =

1884 campaign in the Sino-French War in Vietnam

- Part of the Sino-French War, Tonkin campaign
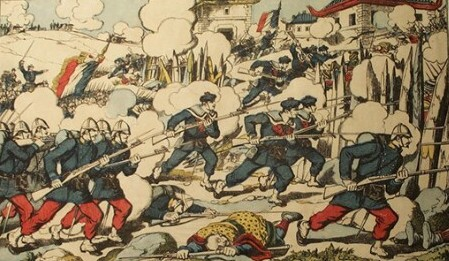
- The battle of Kép, 8 October 1884
Date	2 to 15 October 1884
Location	Bắc Giang, northern Vietnam
Result	French victory

Belligerents
France	Qing dynasty

Commanders and leaders
(French Third Republic) François de Négrier (French Third Republic) Lieutenant-Colonel Donnier	(Qing dynasty) Empress Dowager Cixi (Qing dynasty) Wang Debang (Qing dynasty) Pan Dingxin

Strength
2,800 men	6,000 men

Casualties and losses
65 killed 180 wounded: Lam: 12 killed 27 wounded; Kép: 32 killed 61 wounded.; Chu: 21 killed 92 wounded	Unknown

The Kép campaign (2 to 15 October 1884) was an important campaign in northern Vietnam during the opening months of the Sino-French War (August 1884–April 1885). A force of just under 3,000 French troops under the command of General François de Négrier defeated a major Chinese invasion of the Red River Delta launched by Pan Dingxin's Guangxi Army in successive engagements at Lâm (6 October), Kép (8 October) and Chũ (10 October and 11 October).

== Background ==
During the spring of 1884 the Tonkin Expeditionary Corps, under the command of General Charles-Théodore Millot, routed China's Guangxi Army in the Bắc Ninh campaign (February 1884) and completed the French conquest of the Red River Delta by capturing Hưng Hóa (March 1884), Thái Nguyên (May 1884) and Tuyên Quang (June 1884). Hopes of an early peace with China were shattered on 23 June 1884, however, by the Bắc Lệ ambush, in which a French column advancing to occupy Lạng Sơn was attacked near Bắc Lệ by a detachment of the Guangxi Army. On 23 August 1884, following the breakdown of negotiations to resolve the crisis between France and China, Admiral Amédée Courbet destroyed China's Fujian Fleet at the Battle of Fuzhou, inaugurating the nine-month Sino-French War (August 1884 to April 1885). To avenge the defeat at Fuzhou, Empress Dowager Cixi ordered the commanders of the Guangxi and Yunnan armies to advance into Tonkin, defeat the outnumbered French forces there, recapture Bắc Ninh and occupy Hanoi.

General Millot, whose health was failing, resigned as general-in-chief of the Tonkin Expeditionary Corps in early September 1884 and was replaced by General Louis Brière de l'Isle, the senior of his two brigade commanders. Brière de l'Isle's first task was to beat off a major Chinese invasion of the Red River Delta. In late September 1884 large detachments of the Guangxi Army advanced from Langson and probed into the Luc Nam valley, announcing their presence by ambushing two French gunboats of the Tonkin Flotilla, Hache and Massue, on 2 October. Although French casualties during this ambush were relatively high (1 officer killed and 32 men wounded), the attack deprived the Chinese of strategic surprise. Subsequent French reconnaissances identified three main Chinese concentrations. The Chinese right wing was deployed around the village of Kép on the Mandarin Road, the Chinese centre was at Bao Loc, and the Chinese left wing was at Chu, in the upper valley of the Luc Nam River. Brière de l'Isle responded immediately, despatching General de Négrier to the Luc Nam valley with nearly 3,000 French soldiers aboard several vessels of the Tonkin Flotilla. De Négrier's mission was to attack and defeat the Chinese detachments before they could concentrate.

== The Kép campaign ==
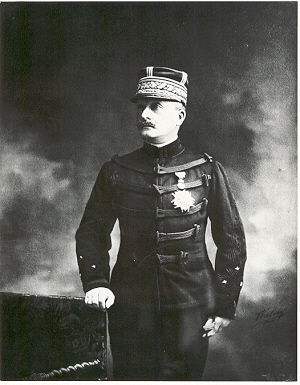
General François Oscar de Négrier (1842–1913)

=== French forces ===
De Négrier's command included units from both the 1st and 2nd Brigades of the Tonkin Expeditionary Corps. The first column, under the command of Lieutenant-Colonel Donnier, included two companies of the 143rd Line Battalion (Captains Cuvellier and Fraissynaud), two companies of chef de bataillon Diguet's 2nd Foreign Legion Battalion (Captains Beynet and Bolgert), 50 Tonkinese riflemen (2nd Lieutenant Bataille) and a section of de Saxcé's artillery battery. The second column consisted of chef de bataillon de Mibielle's 3rd Battalion, 3rd Algerian Rifle Regiment (Lieutenant Martineau and Captains Chirouze, Polère and Valet) and Jourdy's battery. The third and largest column, under de Négrier's direct command, consisted of all four companies of the 111th Line Battalion (Captains Planté, Venturini, Mailhat and Verdun), three companies of the 23rd Line Battalion (Captains Gignoux, Gayon and Pécoul), the remaining two companies of the 143rd Line Battalion (Captains Barbier and Dautelle) and Roussel and de Saxcé's artillery batteries.

=== Chinese forces ===
The Guangxi Army was under the command of generals Wang Debang and Pan Dingxin, both of whom had contributed to the defeat of Lieutenant-Colonel Dugenne's column in June 1884 in the Bắc Lệ ambush. The army's left wing, at Chu, was under the command of Su Yuanchun (蘇元春) and Chen Jia (陳嘉). The Chinese right wing, at Kép, was under the command of Fang Yusheng (方友升) and Zhou Shouchang (周壽昌).

=== French strategy ===
De Négrier planned to use the mobility conferred by the French gunboats to manoeuvre troops rapidly from one point to another, enabling him to concentrate in turn against the separated wings of the Guangxi Army. While Lieutenant-Colonel Donnier's column fixed the Chinese left wing before Chu, where the Chinese had built a large entrenched camp, and de Mibielle's column observed the movements of the Chinese centre, de Négrier would attack and defeat the Chinese right wing at Kép with the bulk of his forces. A victory at Kép would allow him to join Donnier before Chu with the other two columns, and this concentration would force the Chinese left wing either to fight for Chu or to retreat.

In essence, the French plan succeeded. However, not everything went according to plan. Donnier successfully established a bridgehead at Lam on 6 October, close to the Guangxi Army's defences at Chu, and on 8 October de Négrier inflicted a bloody defeat on the Guangxi Army's right wing at Kép. On 9 October de Mibielle's column joined Donnier in front of Chu. On 10 October de Négrier's column left Kép and marched back to Phu Lang Thuong, where a flotilla of gunboats was waiting to ferry the men up the Luc Nam river to join Donnier and de Mibielle in front of Chu, to complete the French concentration for the final stage of the campaign.

All Donnier had to do at this point was to wait patiently until de Négrier's arrival. On 10 October, however, his column was drawn into a costly and premature two-day battle at Chu with the Guangxi Army's left wing. In the event, Donnier won his battle, and on 13 October de Négrier joined him with the Kép column and began to scout the Guangxi Army's defences around Chu in preparation for an assault by the united French forces. The attack was never made. The Chinese, discouraged by the heavy losses they had suffered on 10 and 11 October and by the rout of their comrades at Kép on 8 October, abandoned the entrenched camp of Chu on 19 October and fell back to Bắc Lệ and Dong Song, to protect the approaches to Lạng Sơn.

== The engagements at Lam, Kép and Chu ==
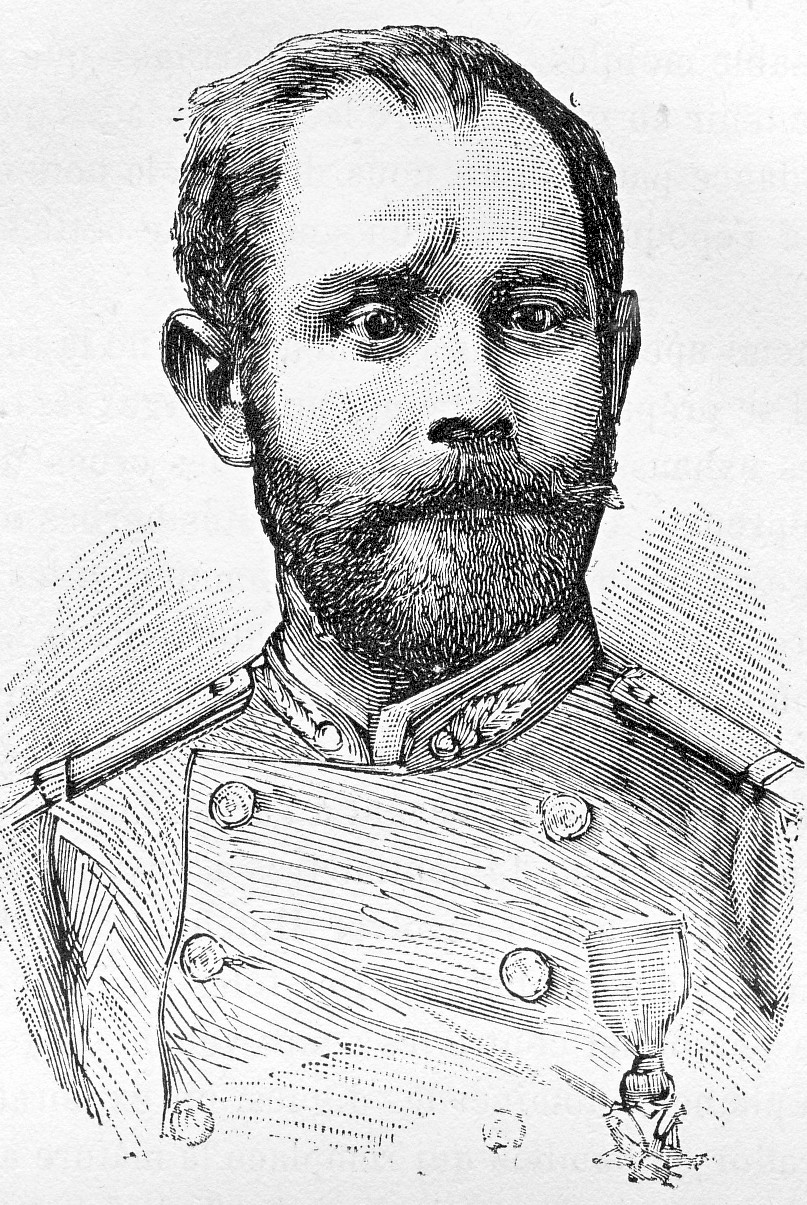
Lieutenant-Colonel Donnier

At Lam, on 6 October, Donnier's column was ferried rapidly up the Luc Nam river on a string of junks towed by the gunboats Hache, Éclair and Massue and the tugs Phủ Lý and Tra Ly, and disembarked opposite the Chinese fort at Chu to seize the villages of Lam and Tray Dam. The Chinese immediately closed with the French, who deployed into an L-shaped line around Lam and fought desperately to hold their precarious bridgehead. At the crisis of the battle the Chinese broke through the French centre, sweeping away Bataille's Tonkinese riflemen and part of Beynet's Legion company, but the timely arrival of French reinforcements enabled Donnier to repair the hole in his line, counterattack, and throw back the Chinese. French casualties at Lam were 12 killed and 27 wounded. The Chinese left more than 100 corpses on the battlefield, and the French estimated their total losses at between 300 and 400 men.

At Kép, on 8 October, de Négrier defeated the Guangxi Army's main body in a bloody engagement. The battle was marked by bitter close-quarter fighting between French and Chinese troops, and de Négrier's soldiers suffered heavy casualties storming the fortified village of Kép. The exasperated victors shot or bayoneted scores of wounded Chinese soldiers after the battle, and reports of French atrocities at Kép shocked public opinion in Europe. In fact, prisoners were rarely taken by either side during the Sino-French War, and the French were equally shocked by the Chinese habit of paying a bounty for severed French heads. French casualties at Kép were 32 killed and 61 wounded. The French estimated Chinese casualties at 1,600 killed (including the entire Chinese garrison of Kép) and around 2,000 wounded.

At Chu, on 10 October, a morning outpost skirmish precipitated by an over-zealous Foreign Legion officer, Captain Cuvellier, escalated into a full-scale afternoon battle in which Donnier's bridgehead at Tray Dam was violently attacked by the Chinese. The French eventually drove off the Chinese attacks, though their rifle fire was less effective than usual. Much of the French ammunition, stored carelessly during the heat and humidity of the Vietnamese summer, had become too damp to fire, and one French unit suffered a misfire rate of 50%. Fortunately for the French, the Chinese never got close enough to take advantage of their vulnerability. On the night of 10 October Donnier ordered trenches to be dug to cover the approaches to Tray Dam. The Chinese resumed the battle on the morning of 11 October, massing their forces for an attack on Donnier's right wing. The attack had no chance of success. The French and Algerians, sheltered in their trenches, had dried out their powder in the hot morning sun. Concentrated, aimed French volleys inflicted heavy casualties on the dense Chinese attack columns and eventually put them to flight. After the failure of this attack, the Chinese broke off the battle. Donnier was content to hold his positions until de Négrier joined him with the Kép column, on 13 October. French casualties at Chu were 21 killed and 92 wounded.

== Significance ==
In the wake of these French victories the Chinese fell back to Bắc Lệ and Dong Song, while de Négrier established important forward positions at Kép and Chu, which threatened the Guangxi Army's base at Lạng Sơn. In January 1885 the French concentrated 7,200 soldiers and 4,500 coolies at Chu, in preparation for a major campaign to take Lạng Sơn. The Kép campaign was an essential preliminary to the February 1885 Lạng Sơn campaign, in which the Tonkin Expeditionary Corps captured Lạng Sơn and drove the Guangxi Army out of Tonkin and back across the Chinese border.
