= Tonkin Flotilla =

1883 French flotilla in Tonkin

The Tonkin Flotilla (French: flottille de Tonkin) of 1883 was a flotilla of French Imperial gunboats and despatch vessels used to enforce French Colonial rule on the waterways of Tonkin (modern-day northern Vietnam). It was organized during an episode of the French Conquest of Vietnam known as the Tonkin campaign (1883–1886), in which the French were to fight against—variously—the Vietnamese, Liu Yongfu's Black Flag Army and the Chinese Guangxi and Yunnan armies with the objective of occupying Tonkin and entrenching a French protectorate there.

== Background ==
In March 1882, on the eve of Commandant Henri Rivière's seizure of the citadel of Hanoi, France had two naval divisions in the Far East. The seas to the east of the Hainan Strait were the responsibility of Rear Admiral Charles Meyer's Far East naval division (division navale de l'Extrême-Orient). France's interests in Indochina were protected by Rivière's Cochinchina naval division (division navale de Cochinchine), responsible for monitoring coastal navigation between Singapore and the Hainan Strait and along the rivers of Cochinchina and Cambodia.

Several vessels under Rivière's command were normally stationed in Cochinchina or Cambodia, including the troopship Drac, the light frigate Alouette and the small gunboats Framée and Javeline. Tilsitt, the flagship of the Cochinchina naval division, was disarmed and in permanent dock at Saigon, and served as the division's storehouse and administrative centre. Most of the division's vessels, however, were stationed in Tonkin, where they were enforcing the right of free navigation on the Red River conceded to France by the Vietnamese government in 1874. Rivière's command in Tonkin consisted of the light frigates Hamelin, Parseval and Antilope (the latter due to be replaced shortly by Pluvier), the heavy gunboats Lynx and Vipère, the seagoing gunboats Fanfare, Léopard and Surprise, and the smaller river gunboats Carabine, Éclair, Hache, Massue, Trombe and Yatagan. The heavy gunboats had crews of 77 men and mounted four cannon, while the smaller gunboats had two cannon each. They all carried a Hotchkiss canon-revolver in their tops.

Following Rivière's defeat and death at the Battle of Paper Bridge (19 June 1883), the navy ministry created a new Tonkin Coasts naval division (division navale des côtes du Tonkin) under the command of Admiral Amédée Courbet, whose mission was to cut off the flow of weapons and ammunition from China to the Black Flag Army by blockading the Gulf of Tonkin. The larger seagoing vessels already on station in Tonkin were transferred to Courbet's new naval division, while the remainder (mostly gunboats) were organised into the 'Tonkin Flotilla'. The flotilla was initially placed under the command of général de brigade Alexandre-Eugène Bouët (1833–87), the French commandant supérieur in Tonkin. Operational command was given to capitaine de vaisseau Morel-Beaulieu.

== Composition ==
The Tonkin Flotilla consisted initially of the light frigates (avisos à roues) Pluvier and Alouette, the seagoing gunboats Fanfare, Léopard and Surprise, the large river gunboats (avisos de flotille à roues) Éclair and Trombe, and the smaller river gunboats (chaloupes-cannonières démontables) Carabine, Hache, Massue and Yatagan. Alouette was normally stationed in Cochinchina, and does not seem to have seen service in Tonkin.

The stationary pontoon Tilsitt at Saigon and the small river gunboats Framée, Javeline and Mousqueton, normally stationed in Cochinchina, were also placed under the orders of the commander of the Tonkin Flotilla.

In April 1884 the Farcy gunboats Revolver and Mitrailleuse, both of which had seen service on the Seine during the Franco-Prussian War (1870–1), arrived in Tonkin. The two gunboats were transported to Tonkin lashed to the bridge of the troopship Bien Hoa, and re-floating them on their arrival at Haiphong was a technical task of considerable complexity.

In October 1883 Admiral Courbet asked the navy ministry to design a new class of shallow-draft gunboats which could penetrate the maze of shallow tributary streams and arroyos of the Delta, so that the Black Flags and pirates could be hunted down far more effectively. The ministry accepted his recommendations, and laid down two new classes of gunboats. Eight gunboats of the Henri Rivière class were designed and built specifically for service in Tonkin, while more than a dozen gunboats of the Arquebuse class were produced for use in both Tonkin and Madagascar.

The gunboats of the former class were named after the French officers who had been killed or mortally wounded in action in Tonkin in Francis Garnier and Henri Rivière's campaigns: Francis Garnier, Colonel Carreau, Henri Rivière, Berthe de Villers, Jacquin and Moulun. The gunboats, built at the Claparède works in Lorient, reached Haiphong in the autumn of 1884.

The Arquebuse class of gunboats was designed for more general service, in Madagascar as well as Tonkin. Six vessels in this class (Arquebuse, Alerte, Avalanche, Bourrasque, Mutine and Rafale) were deployed in Tonkin in the summer of 1884. These 70 horsepower (52 kW) gunboats were 30 metres long and 5 metres wide, cruised at 8 knots (15 km/h), and drew less than one-and-a-half metres of water. Although they could carry only 60 men, they were armed with two 90-millimetre cannon and three Hotchkiss canons-revolvers, so that they packed a powerful punch. Two other gunboats of the Arquebuse class, Casse-tête and Estoc, joined the Tonkin flotilla in early 1885. They differed from the earlier models in having two masts, each with a Hotchkiss station.

In February 1885, on the eve of the Lang Son Campaign, the Flotilla also included the gunboats Hyène, Jaguar, Nagotna and Petit Haiphong. The Flotilla also deployed a number of steam launches and tugs that were used to tow strings of junks loaded with men, ammunition or food. Contemporary French sources mention the vessels Haiphong, Pélican, Kowloon, Whampoo, Ruri Maru, Cua Cam, Cua Lac, Cua Dai, Phu Ly and Tra Ly. Just as French transports were often named after French rivers, these small river craft for use in Tonkin tended to be named after the watercourses of the Tonkin Delta.

By 1886 the Flotilla included the gunboats Levrard, Bossant and Cuvellier, named after three French officers killed in action in Tonkin during the Sino-French War.

== Operations ==
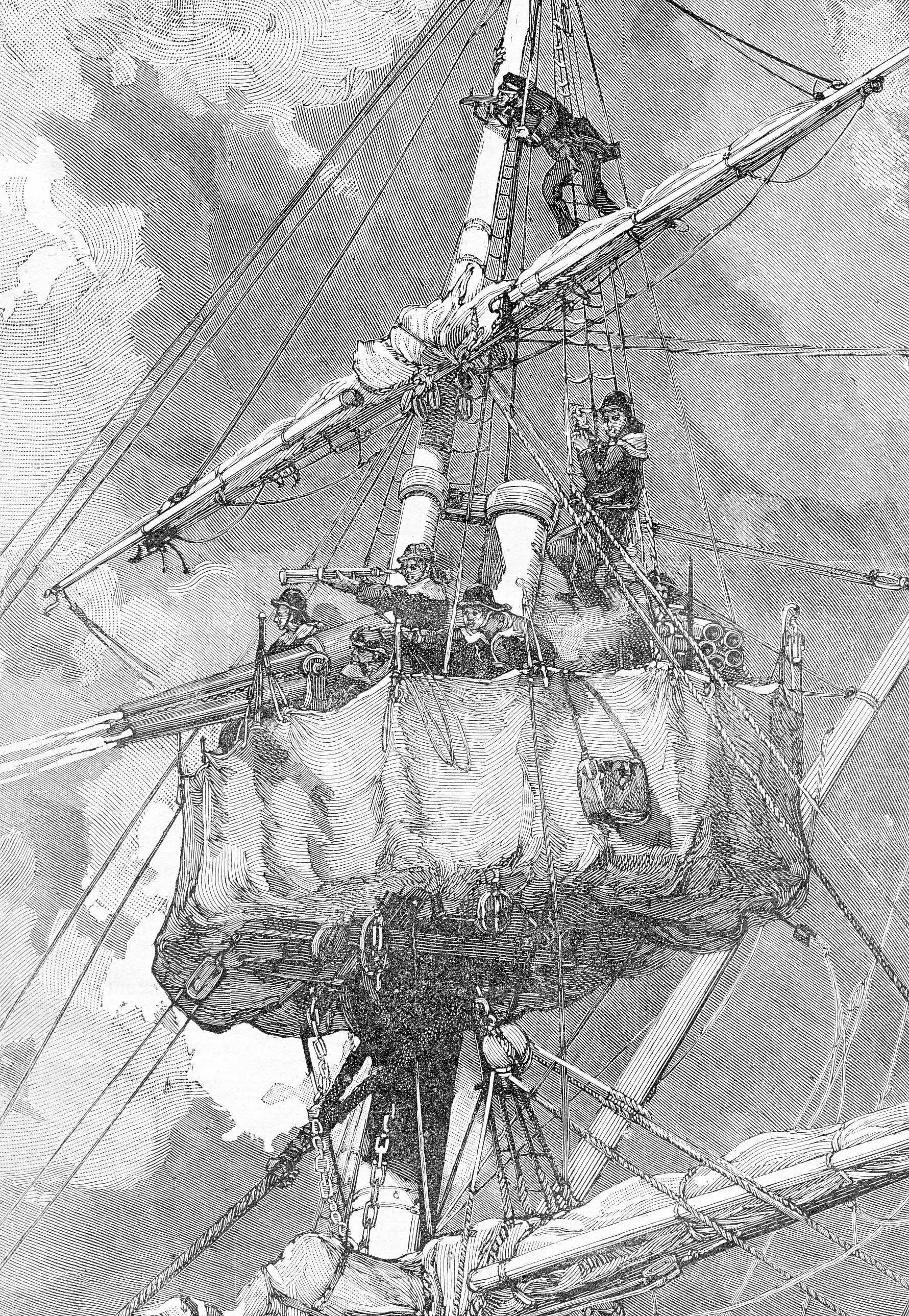
Pluvier engages the Vietnamese defences at Nam Định with her masthead-mounted canon-revolver, 26 March 1883

Besides policing the inland waterways of Tonkin, the vessels of the Tonkin Flotilla were also used in close support of the movements of the Tonkin Expeditionary Corps, and took part in several actions in the Delta against the Black Flag Army and the Chinese Guangxi and Yunnan Armies.

The gunboats Carabine, Fanfare, Hache, Pluvier, Surprise and Yatagan took part in Henri Rivière's Nam Định expedition in March 1883 and supported the French infantry attack on the Nam Định defences on 27 March with a preliminary bombardment on 26 March.

The gunboat Song Cau (or Song Coi) took part in a sortie by the French garrison of Nam Định in July 1883 that inflicted a serious defeat on besieging Vietnamese forces under the command of Prince Hoàng Kế Viêm.

The gunboats Pluvier, Léopard, Fanfare, Éclair, Mousqueton and Trombe took part in the Battle of Phủ Hoài (15 August 1883).

The gunboats Pluvier, Léopard, Fanfare, Éclair, Hache and Mousqueton took part in the Battle of Palan (1 September 1883).

The gunboats Pluvier, Trombe, Éclair, Hache, Mousqueton and Yatagan took part in the Sơn Tây Campaign (December 1883).

=== Kep Campaign, October 1884 ===
The Tonkin Flotilla played a decisive strategic role in General François de Négrier's Kep Campaign (October 1884), in which the French defeated a major Chinese invasion of the Tonkin Delta. In late September 1884 large detachments of the Guangxi Army advanced from Lạng Sơn and probed into the Luc Nam valley. On 2 October the French gunboats Hache and Massue, on patrol in the Luc Nam river, were ambushed from the riverbank by a strong force of Chinese infantry. A third gunboat, Mousqueton, came to the rescue, and the three French vessels escaped downriver to the French post at Sept Pagodes. Although the French suffered heavy casualties in this ambush (lieutenant de vaisseau Challier of Massue was killed and 32 sailors and soldiers were wounded), the Guangxi Army had disclosed its presence prematurely. Back in Hanoi, General Louis Brière de l'Isle reacted swiftly to the Chinese threat. The French used the mobility conferred by their gunboats to move men and supplies between Phu Lang Thuong and the Luc Nam, enabling de Négrier to concentrate his forces rapidly and defeat the two widely separated wings of the Chinese Guangxi Army one after the other. Hache, Éclair and Massue, accompanied by the tugs Phủ Lý and Tra Ly and the barge Cua Dai, landed Donnier's column at Lam on 6 October, threatening the Chinese army's left wing at Chu while de Négrier concentrated against the Chinese forces at Kép.

=== Resupply of Tuyên Quang, October–November 1884 ===
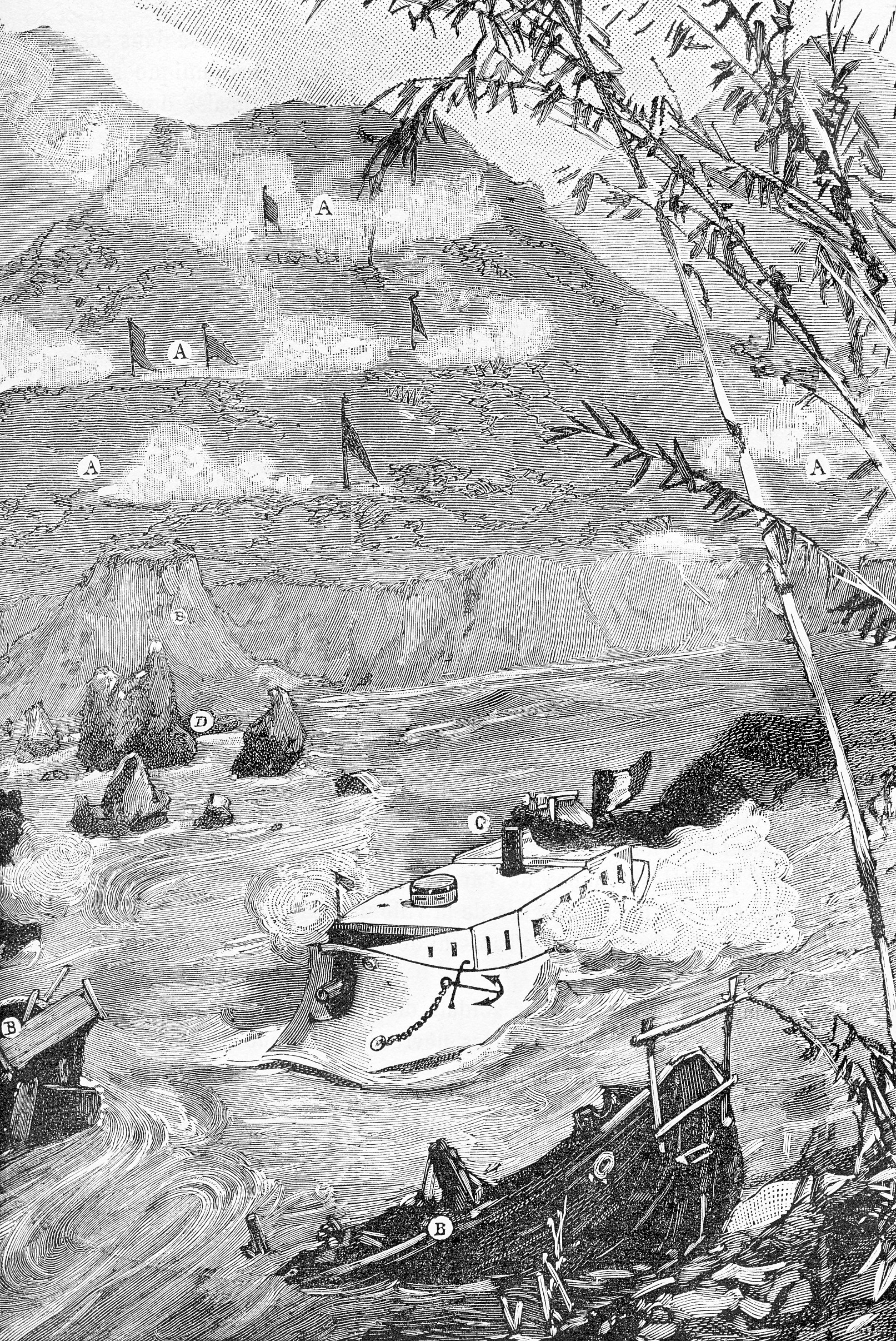
Revolver runs the gauntlet of the Chinese defences at Yu Oc, October 1884

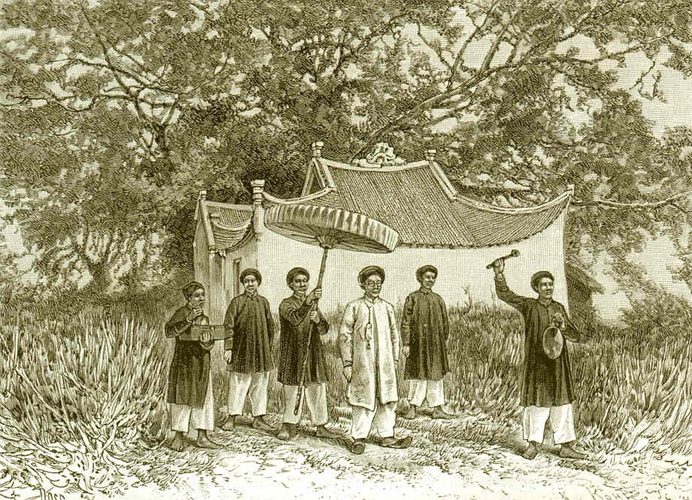
Prefect of Phu-doan, 1884

During October and November 1884 the Farcy gunboats Revolver and Mitrailleuse, based at Tuyên Quang, and the gunboats Bourrasque, Éclair, Mutine and Trombe, operating out of Hưng Hóa, mounted a number of dangerous supply runs along the Clear River between Hưng Hóa and Tuyên Quang in support of the small French garrison at Tuyên Quang. The supply runs were successful, but the French suffered a constant dribble of casualties as their gunboats were engaged by the Black Flags. On one occasion Revolver had to steam at full speed to break a barrage laid across the Clear River, and on another occasion her crew sustained casualties of 2 men dead and 3 wounded (including the commander, enseigne de vaisseau de Balincourt) from enemy fire from Yu Oc. In an engagement on 12 November 1884 Trombe suffered casualties of 1 man dead and 7 wounded. Revolver was eventually withdrawn from Tuyên Quang, but Mitrailleuse remained on station, and later distinguished herself in the Siege of Tuyên Quang (24 November 1884 – 3 March 1885).

=== Relief of Tuyên Quang, February–March 1885 ===
The Tonkin Flotilla played an important role in the relief of Tuyên Quang. In late February 1885 the gunboats Henri Rivière, Berthe de Villers, Moulun, Éclair and Trombe transported 2,400 soldiers of Lieutenant-Colonel Laurent Giovanninelli's 1st Brigade from Hanoi up the Red and Clear Rivers and put them ashore near the French post of Phu Doan on the Clear River, fifty kilometres southwest of Tuyên Quang. Giovanninelli had hoped to have their support when he attacked an important Chinese blocking position at Hòa Mộc, but the water level in the Clear River was so low that the gunboats grounded several kilometres above Phu Doan. Their crews endured a week of back-breaking labour, hauling the gunboats along an almost-dry river bed, but despite their utmost efforts the gunboats were absent from the Battle of Hòa Mộc on 2 March. Some of the French crewmen were said to have wept with rage at their inability to take part in the crucial battle for Tuyên Quang. The gunboats finally reached Tuyên Quang on 4 March, the day after the post was relieved.

General Brière de l'Isle was careful to acknowledge the heroic efforts made by their captains and crews in an order of the day issued on 5 March. After praising the courage of the marine infantry and Turcos of the 1st Brigade, who suffered more than 400 casualties storming the Chinese defences at Hòa Mộc, he praised the sacrifices made by the men of the Flotilla:

Vous avez été plus heureux que les états-majors et les équipages des canonnières Henri Rivière, Berthe de Villers, Moulun, Éclair et Trombe, qui ont espéré jusqu’au dernier moment partager vos dangers. Au prix d'efforts inouïs, ils ont trainé leurs bâtiments pendant sept jours consécutifs dans une rivière sans eau et ont pu atteindre Phu-Doan, Yu-oc et les abords de Tuyen-Quan. Ils ont ainsi prouvé que des obstacles considérés jusqu’alors comme insurmontables n’existaient pas pour eux.

(You were luckier than the officers and the crews of the gunboats Henri Rivière, Berthe de Villers, Moulun, Éclair and Trombe, who had hoped right up to the last moment to share your dangers. At the cost of unimaginable efforts they dragged their vessels for seven consecutive days up a waterless river and succeeded in reaching Phu Doan, Yu Oc and the approaches to Tuyên Quang. They thus demonstrated that obstacles hitherto supposed insurmountable did not exist for them.)

== See also ==
- Far East Squadron

== Vessels of the Tonkin Flotilla ==
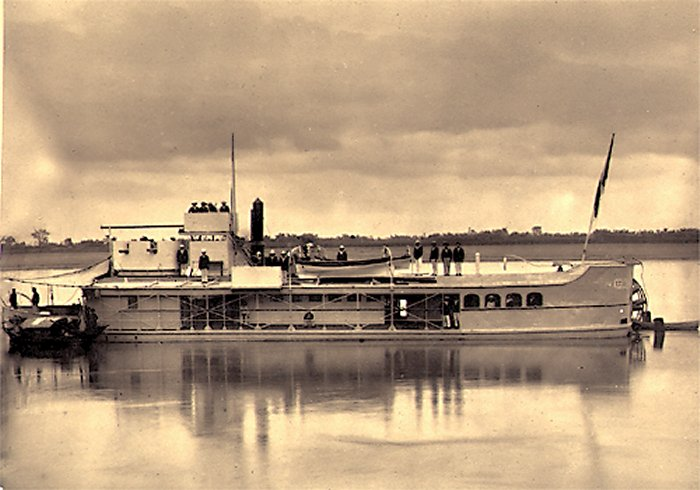
Éclair

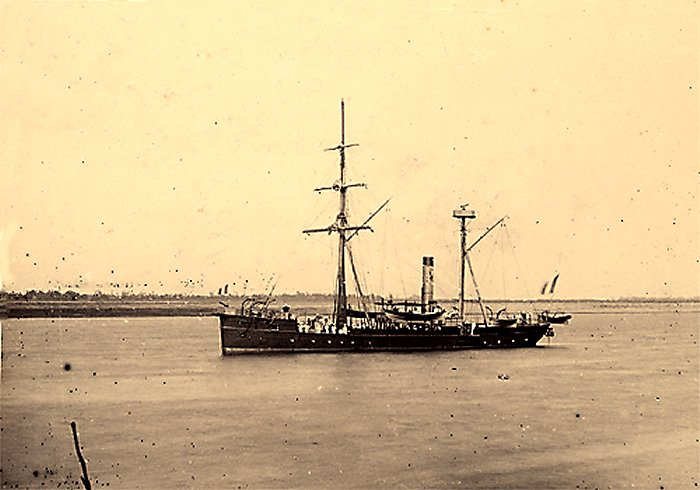
Fanfare

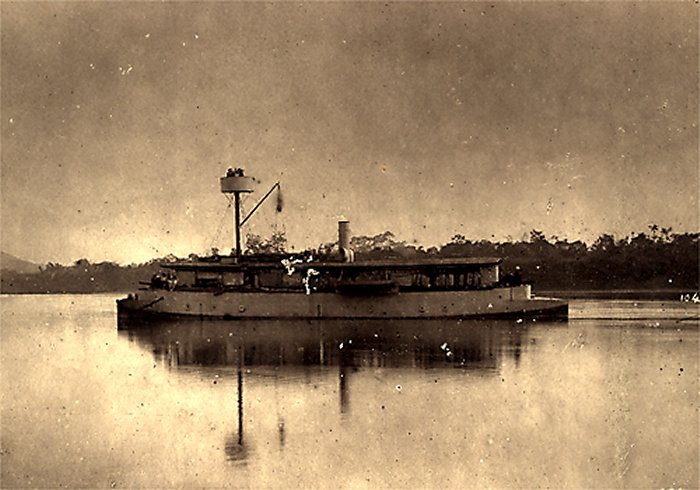
Mutine

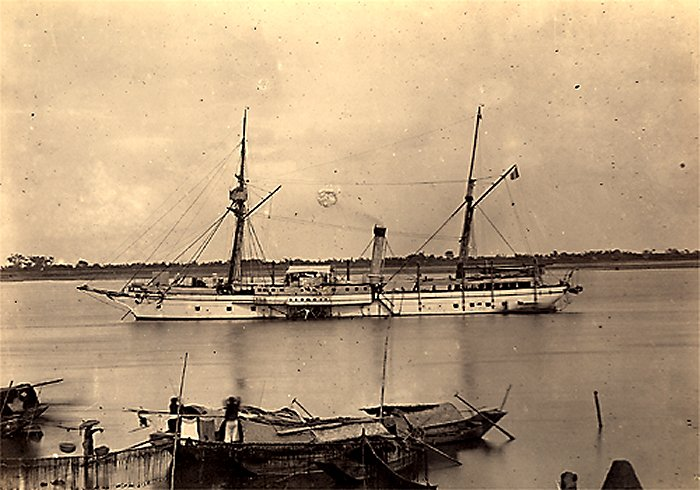
Pluvier

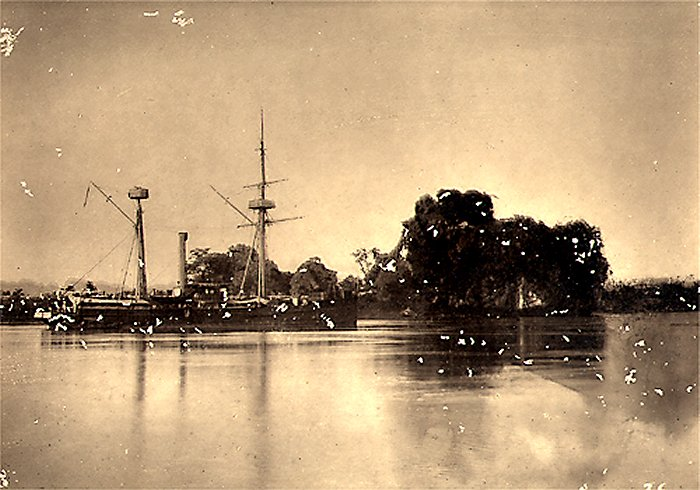
Surprise

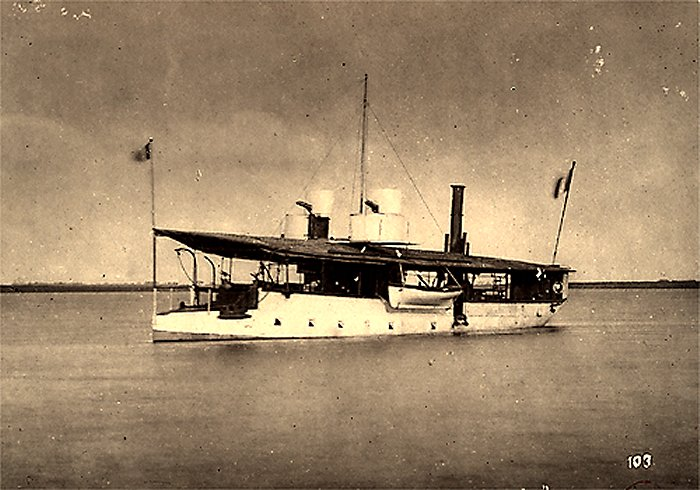
Yatagan
