= Flag of Weihaiwei =

British colonial flag (1903–1930)

- Adopted: 1903
- Relinquished: 1930

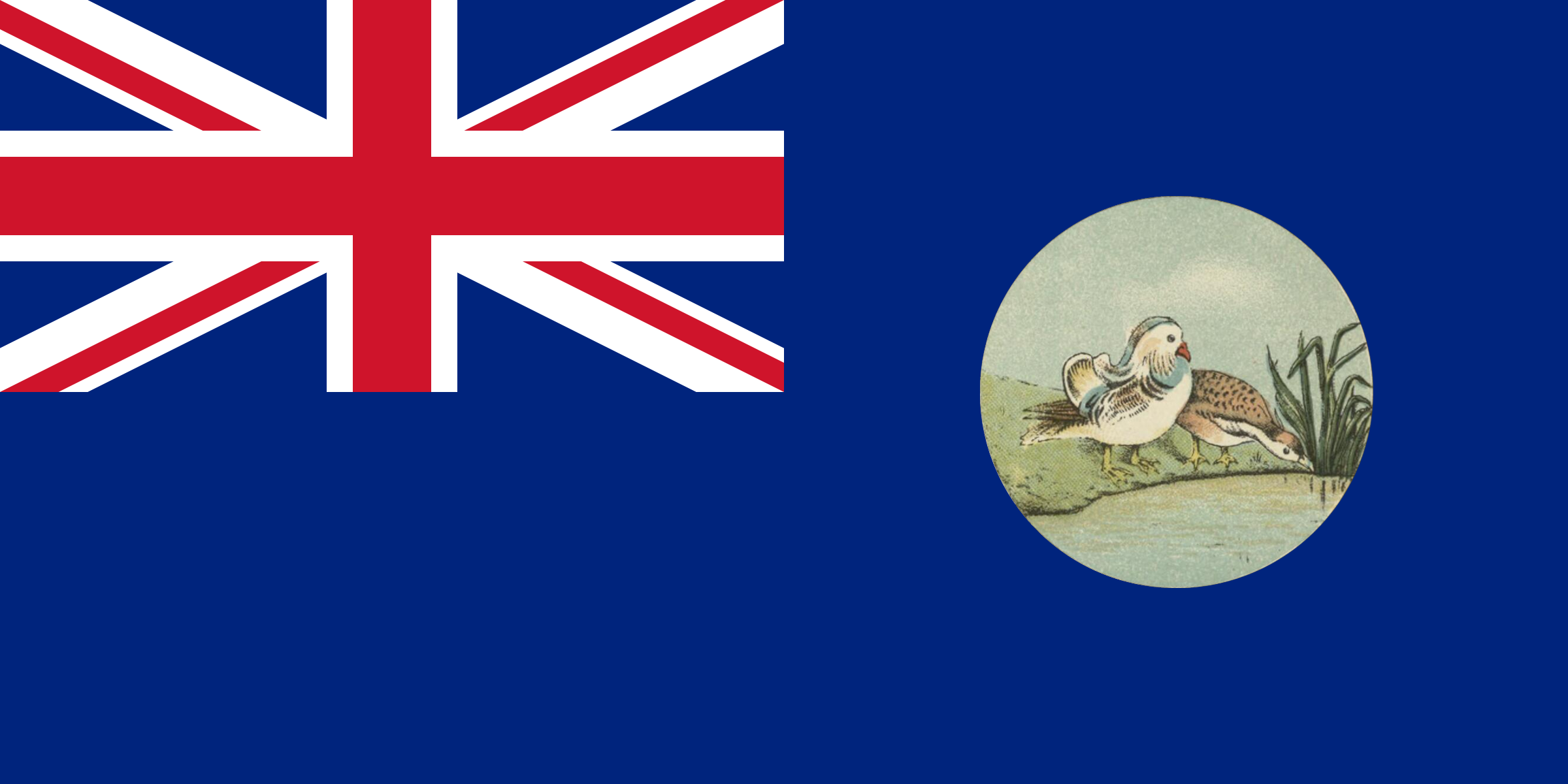
Original image of the territory's emblem

The flag of Weihaiwei was the flag used by the United Kingdom’s leased territory of Weihaiwei during British rule between 1903 and 1930. The flag consisted of a British Blue Ensign with an emblem containing a pair of Mandarin ducks.

== History ==
The flag of the Commissioner of Weihaiwei until 1903

The flag of the Commissioner of Weihaiwei between 1903 and 1930

In 1898, the Empire of China leased the port of Weihaiwei (威海衛) to the British Empire for 25 years. During the first few years, there was no individual flag for Weihaiwei. However, the Commissioners of Weihaiwei in Liu-kung Tao (劉公島) used a Union Jack combined with a badge of a Chinese imperial dragon on a yellow background. In 1902, the new civil Commissioner for Weihaiwei James Stewart Lockhart wrote to the Colonial Office requesting a new flag for the territory, as he felt it inappropriate to use a Chinese national symbol on a British flag (the Flag of the Qing dynasty at the time was a dragon on a yellow field), and suggested using Mandarin ducks instead. He wrote to them stating:

"The design of the flag hitherto used by the Commissioner of this Dependency is a dragon on the Union Jack and is in my opinion quite unsuitable. I have therefore to request that the Crown Agents may be instructed to have made for the use of the Commissioner two new flags, the device of the Mandarin Duck being substituted for the Dragon, which is as you are aware the national emblem of China and not appropriate in the case of a British Dependency".

Following the letter, King Edward VII approved the change of design for both the Commissioner's flag and the blue ensign in 1903. He also provided for the flag to be used for merchant shipping as the merchant ensign. In 1930, when the lease expired after negotiations with the Republic of China, it was the British flag that was lowered at the handover ceremony and not the flag of Weihaiwei.

== Design ==
The flag was designed as a British Blue Ensign defaced with a badge featuring two Mandarin ducks: a male in the foreground and a female in the background drinking from a stream while standing on a reed-covered bank.

Mandarin ducks were chosen to replace the Chinese imperial dragon badge, in keeping with the British colonial tradition of using representative common local wildlife from a specific territory as the emblem on a colonial flag.
