= Daintree =

Daintree may refer to:

== North Queensland ==
- Daintree, Queensland, town
- Daintree River, flows into the Pacific Ocean south of Cape Tribulation
- Daintree Rainforest, nominated for World Heritage listing in 1988
- Daintree National Park, containing part of the Daintree Rainforest
- Daintree Reef, off the coast from the Daintree Rainforest
- Richard Daintree (1832–1878), pioneering geologist in North Queensland

== Other ==
- John Dodson Daintree (1862–1952), British Royal Navy officer
- Daintree rainbowfish
- Daintree River Ferry
- Daintree ulcer
