= Twilight in the Forbidden City =

1934 memoir of Puyi by Reginald Johnston

- Title page for Twilight in the Forbidden City (1934)
- Author: Reginald Johnston
- Language: English
- Subject: Chinese history
- Genre: Memoir
- Publisher: Victor Gollancz Ltd.
- Publication date: 1934
- Publication place: United Kingdom
- Pages: 486

Twilight in the Forbidden City (Chinese: 紫禁城的黄昏; pinyin: Zǐjìnchéng de Huánghūn) is Reginald Johnston's 486-page memoir of the Xuantong Emperor of the Qing dynasty.

Johnston was tutor to the Emperor and an eyewitness to events in China in the 1920s and 1930s. Johnston was also a professor of Chinese at the University of London as well as the British Commissioner of Weihaiwei.

== Overview ==
Twilight in the Forbidden City was prefaced by Puyi himself in the year 1931.

Johnston provides a good deal of anecdotal material for the last days of the Qing court before the 1911 Revolution. He knew many of the active players in those events, and his observations on the Qing court's political structure, and in particular the Imperial Household Department, are of historical significance.

Twilight in the Forbidden City is a history of an entire period and not an exclusive portrait of the last emperor of China. The film The Last Emperor features the book.

In the fourth impression, published in December 1934 by Victor Gollancz Ltd., additional information such as the fully spread fan (pp. 448–9) was developed and some important parts of the history, such as the confinement of Cao Kun (p. 381) and Kang Youwei's escape from the country (p. 17), were reviewed for modification with "preface to the fourth impression" (p. 6) (Japanese translation; ISBN 4-939154-04-1).

== Publication history ==
- Reginald F. Johnston, Twilight in the Forbidden City, Victor Gollancz Ltd., 1934, 486 pp.
- Reginald F. Johnston, Twilight in the Forbidden City, Oxford University Press, 1985, 486 pp.
- Reginald F. Johnston, Twilight in the Forbidden City, Soul Care Publishing, 2008, 488 pp. with bonus previously unpublished chapter.
