= John Dodson Daintree =

British naval officer

Captain John Dodson Daintree, CBE (2 January 1864 – 21 September 1952) was a British Royal Navy officer, who served as Commissioner of Weihaiwei from 1901 to 1902, and as Inspector-General of the Coast Guard service after its formation in 1923.

== Naval career ==
Daintree joined the Royal Navy in 1879, and was posted as a supernumerary naval cadet to HMS Bellerophon, serving on the North America station. He was a sub-lieutenant when posted to HMS Dart for navigating duties in January 1886, and was promoted to lieutenant later the same year, on 2 October 1886. The following year, he was on 13 September 1887 posted to HMS Sultan, in the Mediterranean Fleet, and a year later to HMS Griffon in October 1888.

Promoted to commander on 31 December 1899, he was in March 1900 transferred to the Royal Naval College, Greenwich, for Compass course, and the following month posted as a lieutenant for navigation to HMS Amphitrite.

Commissioner's flag (1898–1903)

In 1901 he was appointed by the War Office as Commissioner of Weihaiwei, then under British rule. The War Office were responsible for Weihaiwei after it was leased in 1898, as it was envisaged that it would become a naval base similar to British Hong Kong. As such, the first Commissioners of Weihaiwei were appointed from the British Army or Navy and based themselves in Liu-kung Tao. However a survey led by the Royal Engineers deemed that Weihaiwei was unsuitable for a major naval base or trading port. As a result in late 1901, responsibility was transferred from the War Office to the Colonial Office, which wanted a civilian to be appointed as the Commissioner. Thus Daintree was re-assigned after only a year.

He was promoted to captain on 1 January 1908 and had retired from the navy when he was re-called for service as Senior Naval Officer at Newhaven late in the First World War. Situated on the English Channel in East Sussex, Newhaven was a minor Royal Navy base during that war, serving as Portsmouth's auxiliary operational base. After the war, he served for several years as Senior-inspector of Life-Saving Apparatus under the Board of Trade. On the formation of the Coast Guard Force in April 1923, he was appointed its first Inspector-general, serving as such until 1926, when he retired. He devoted the rest of his life to visiting schools all around the country to lecture on life-saving at sea and how to restore people on the verge of drowning back to life.

Daintree died at Beaconsfield on 21 September 1952.

Government offices
Preceded by Major-General Sir Arthur Dorward	Commissioner of Weihaiwei; 1901–1902	Succeeded by Sir James Stewart Lockhart
