= Reginald Johnston =

Scottish diplomat in China (1874–1938)

Sir Reginald Johnston KCMG CBE
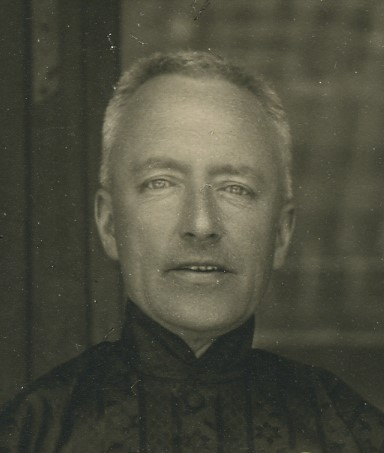
- Johnston at the Forbidden City in 1924

Commissioner of Weihaiwei
- In office 1927–1930
- Preceded by: Walter Russell Brown

Personal details
- Born: Reginald Fleming Johnston; 13 October 1874 Edinburgh, Scotland
- Died: 6 March 1938 (aged 63) Eilean Rìgh, Scotland
- Education: University of Edinburgh; Magdalen College, Oxford
- Occupation: Educator
- Known for: Tutor to Puyi, the last emperor of China

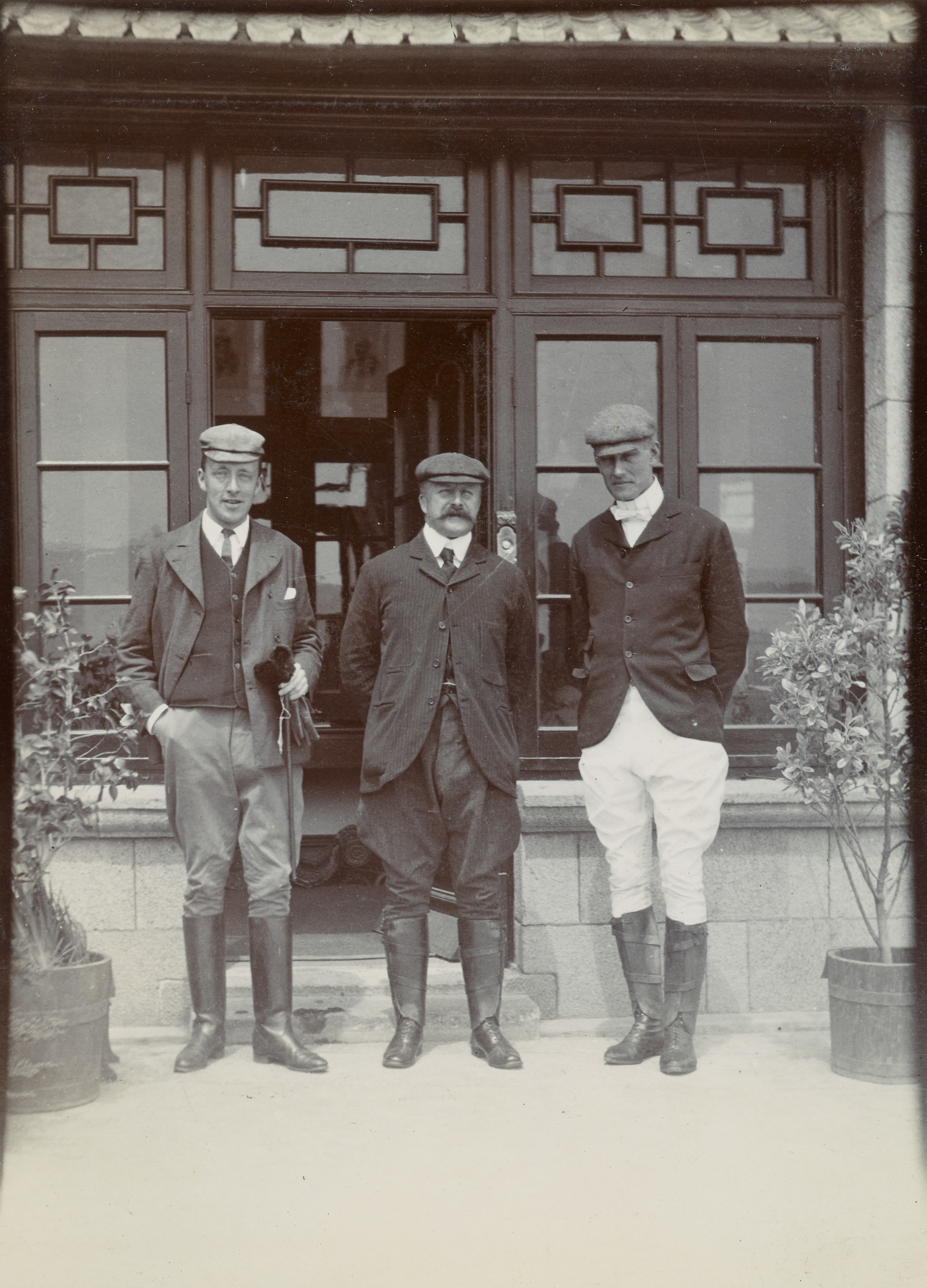
From left to right, Johnston, Lockhart, and Johnston's best friend, Cecil Clementi, in front of Weihaiwei's government house, 1905.

Sir Reginald Fleming Johnston KCMG CBE (simplified Chinese: 庄士敦爵士; traditional Chinese: 莊士敦爵士; pinyin: Zhuāngshìdūn juéshì; lit. 'Sir Johnston'; 13 October 1874 – 6 March 1938) was a Scottish diplomat and colonial official who served as the tutor and advisor to Puyi, the last emperor of China. He was also the last British Commissioner of Weihaiwei. Johnston's book Twilight in the Forbidden City (1934) was used as a source for Bernardo Bertolucci's film dramatization of Puyi's life, The Last Emperor.

== Early life ==
Johnston was born in Edinburgh, Scotland. He studied at the University of Edinburgh and later was awarded a scholarship to read modern history at Magdalen College, Oxford. While at Oxford Johnston had begun a friendship with Cecil Clementi. Both shared an interest in sinology; Clementi and Johnston would keep in contact for the rest of their lives.

In 1898, he joined the Colonial Service and was initially posted to Hong Kong. In 1904, he was transferred to the British leased territory at Weihaiwei on the coast of the Shandong Peninsula as a District Officer, working with Sir James Stewart Lockhart. For his extreme industry, Johnston was noted from his superiors as a capable colonial magistrate. Johnston was also a keen traveller. In 1902, he explored Tonkin, Laos and Siam. In 1904, he visited Kiautschou, Jinan, and later Korea. In January 1906, he undertook a year-long journey from Peking to Mandalay, publishing an account of his experiences in 1908.

A "militant anti-Christian" whose criticism of missionaries in China possibly hindered his promotion, Johnston was fascinated by Chinese Buddhism. In 1908, he had a private audience with the 13th Dalai Lama, one of the few westerners to do so. He wrote three books during his time in the service: From Peking to Mandalay (1908), Lion and Dragon in Northern China (1910), and Buddhist China (1913).

== Tutor to Puyi in the Forbidden City ==
Selected by the Colonial Office for his expertise in Chinese history and culture in 1919, he was appointed tutor of thirteen-year-old Puyi who still lived inside the Forbidden City in Peking as a non-sovereign monarch.

Johnston and Isabel Ingram, daughter of an American missionary and the empress's tutor, were the only foreigners in history to be allowed inside the inner court of the Qing dynasty. Johnston carried high imperial titles and lived in both the Forbidden City and the New Summer Palace. Johnston met the Ming dynasty imperial descendant, Zhu Yuxun, the Marquis of Extended Grace, and arranged for him to meet Puyi in the Forbidden City.

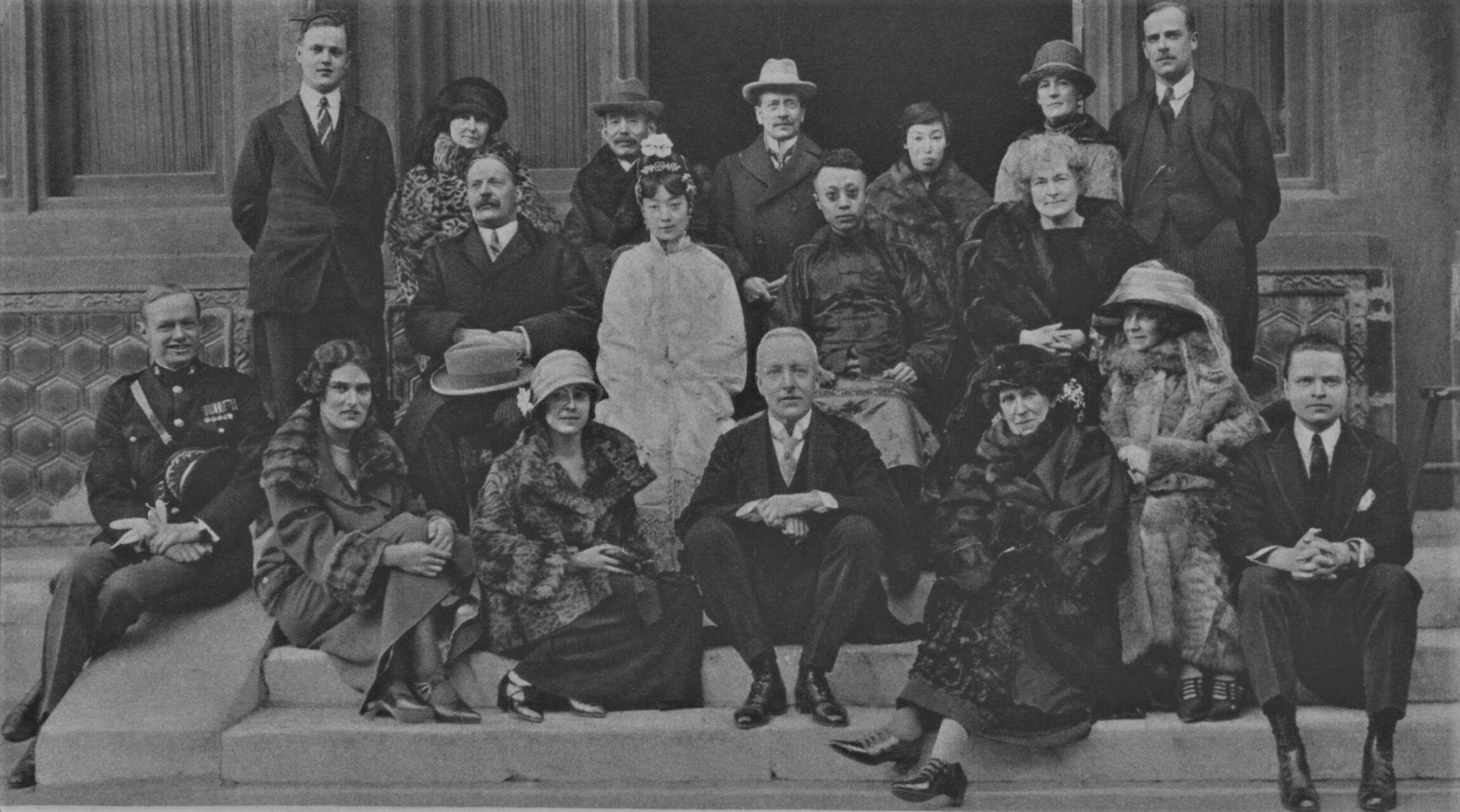
Johnston and Puyi at the British Legation in Peking, 1924.

More than a tutor, Johnston befriended the isolated adolescent. In his account of his time at the Forbidden City, Johnston notes the rampant corruption of the imperial household, with eunuchs selling off dynastic treasures. He obtained a bicycle and telephone for Puyi, and against the wishes of the retainers, much-needed spectacles.

After Puyi was expelled from the Forbidden City in 1924, Johnston briefly served in an advisory capacity to Puyi before returning to his colonial service duties, also serving as Secretary to the British China Indemnity Commission in 1926. In 1927, he was appointed the second civilian Commissioner at Weihaiwei. He ran the territory until it was returned to the Republic of China on 1 October 1930. Johnston tried to get the British diplomatic legation in Peking to host Puyi, and although the British authorities were not very interested in welcoming the former emperor, the British representative eventually gave Johnston his consent. However, he later discovered that Puyi—in view of the situation and against Johnston's advice—had taken refuge in the Japanese legation after being advised by Zheng Xiaoxu.

== After China ==
Johnston was appointed Professor of Chinese in the University of London in 1931, a post based at the School of Oriental and African Studies, to which he bequeathed his library in 1935. This library, one of the finest collections of Chinese and East Asian books in the country, consists of over 16,000 volumes.

He retained his ties with Puyi, hosting one of his sisters and her husband at his house in Mortlake Road, Kew, in London during the 1930s, and even visited him in Manchukuo in July 1935.

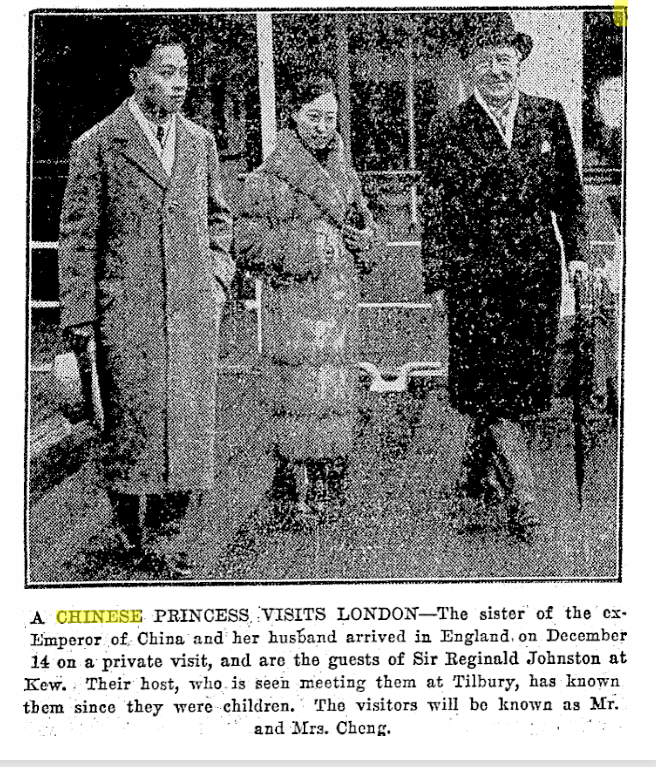
Johnston in England with Puyi's sister (1932)

Johnston retired in 1937, having acquired the small island of Eilean Rìgh in Loch Craignish, Scotland. Puyi granted Sir Reginald Fleming Johnston permission to fly the Imperial flag of Manchukuo on the island, making it the only location outside of China to do so, and grew a Chinese style garden. After a short illness, he died in Edinburgh. In his will, he requested that no religious ceremony be conducted. In accordance with his wishes, he was cremated. His ashes were scattered on his island and the surrounding loch.

He never married but was at one stage engaged to the historian Eileen Power, and was close to author Stella Benson. He was named as a respondent in the divorce of Elizabeth Sparshott, and was engaged to her at the time leading up to his death. Against his explicit request, Sparshott burned many of his materials and letters, including ones from Puyi's childhood in the Forbidden City. Sparshott justified her actions by saying "when a woman makes the supreme sacrifice for a man (her reputation) she probably feels too deeply to be able to identify herself with him for some long time".

Johnston's book Twilight in the Forbidden City (1934) describes his experiences in Peking and was used as a source for Bernardo Bertolucci's film dramatization of Puyi's life The Last Emperor. He was portrayed by Peter O'Toole in the film.

== Honours ==
Johnston was appointed a Commander of the Order of the British Empire (CBE) in 1918, a Companion of the Order of St Michael and St George (CMG) in the 1928 Birthday Honours, and promoted to Knight Commander of the Order (KCMG) in the 1930 Birthday Honours.

== Published works ==
- Johnston, Reginald Fleming (1892). Queen of the Fairies. UK. ISBN 979-8617662728.
- Anonymous (1904). The Last Days of Theodoric the Ostrogoth and Other Verses.
- Johnston, Reginald Fleming (1905). Remarks on the Province of Shantung. Cornell University Library. ISBN 978-1-112-55778-1.
- Johnston, Reginald Fleming (1908). From Peking to Mandalay: A Journey from North China to Burma Through Tibetan Ssuch'uan and Yunnan. Soul Care Publishing. ISBN 0-9680459-7-9.
- Johnston, Reginald Fleming (1910). Lion and Dragon in Northern China. Nabu Press. ISBN 978-1-148-73250-3.
- Johnston, Reginald Fleming (1911). A Chinese Appeal to Christendom Concerning Christian Missions. Nabu Press. ISBN 978-1-149-01612-1.
- Johnston, Reginald Fleming (1913). Buddhist China. Soul Care Publishing. ISBN 0-9680459-3-6.
- Johnston, Reginald Fleming (1918). Letters to a Missionary. Cornell University Library. ISBN 978-1-112-04861-6.
- Johnston, Reginald Fleming (1921). The Chinese Drama. Kelly and Walsh. ISBN 978-1481220675.
- Johnston, Reginald Fleming (1934). Twilight in the Forbidden City. Soul Care Publishing. ISBN 0-9680459-5-2.
- Johnston, Reginald Fleming (1935). Confucianism and Modern China. Soul Care Publishing. ISBN 0-9680459-4-4.

Government offices
Preceded by Walter Russell Brown	British Commissioner of Weihaiwei; 1923–1930	Weihaiwei returned to China
