= Wenquan, Weihai =

Wenquan 温泉镇
- Town
- Location in Shandong
- Coordinates: 37°22′32″N 122°10′03″E
- Country: People's Republic of China
- Province: Shandong
- Prefecture-level city: Weihai
- District: Huancui
- Elevation: 64 m (210 ft)
- Time zone: UTC+8 (China Standard)
- Area code: 0631

Wenquan (simplified Chinese: 温泉; traditional Chinese: 溫泉; pinyin: Wēnquán; lit. 'hot springs') is a town in Huancui District, Weihai, in eastern Shandong province, China, located just south of the city centre. As of 2011, it has four residential communities (社区) 26 villages under its administration.

== See also ==
- List of township-level divisions of Shandong
