= Hamilton Bower =

Sir Hamilton Bower
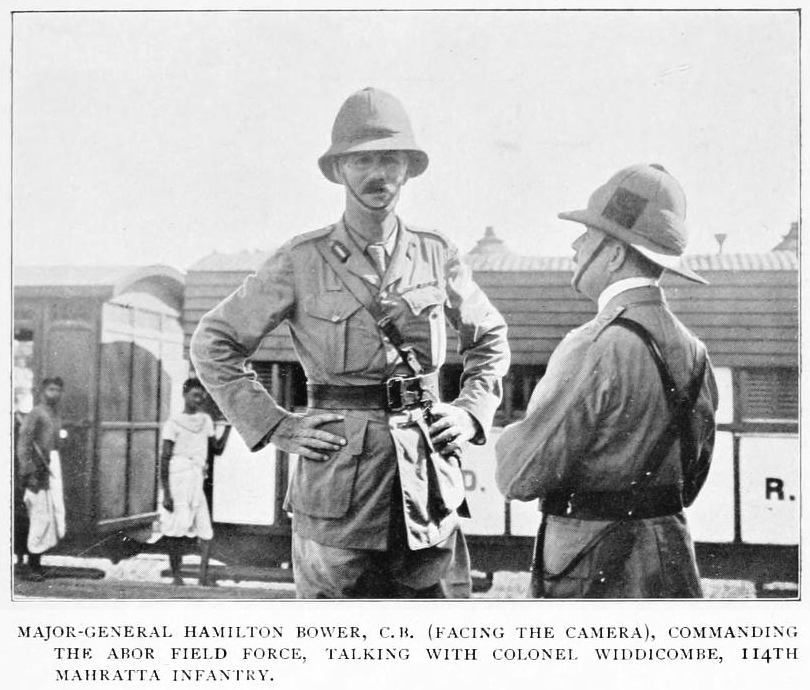
- Sir Hamilton Bower
- Born: 1 September 1858; Portsea Island, Hampshire, England
- Died: 5 March 1940 (aged 81); North Berwick, East Lothian, Scotland
- Military career
- Allegiance: United Kingdom
- Branch: British Indian Army
- Rank: Major General
- Commands: Dehra Ismail Khan Brigade; Assam Brigade
- Awards: Knight Commander of the Order of the Bath

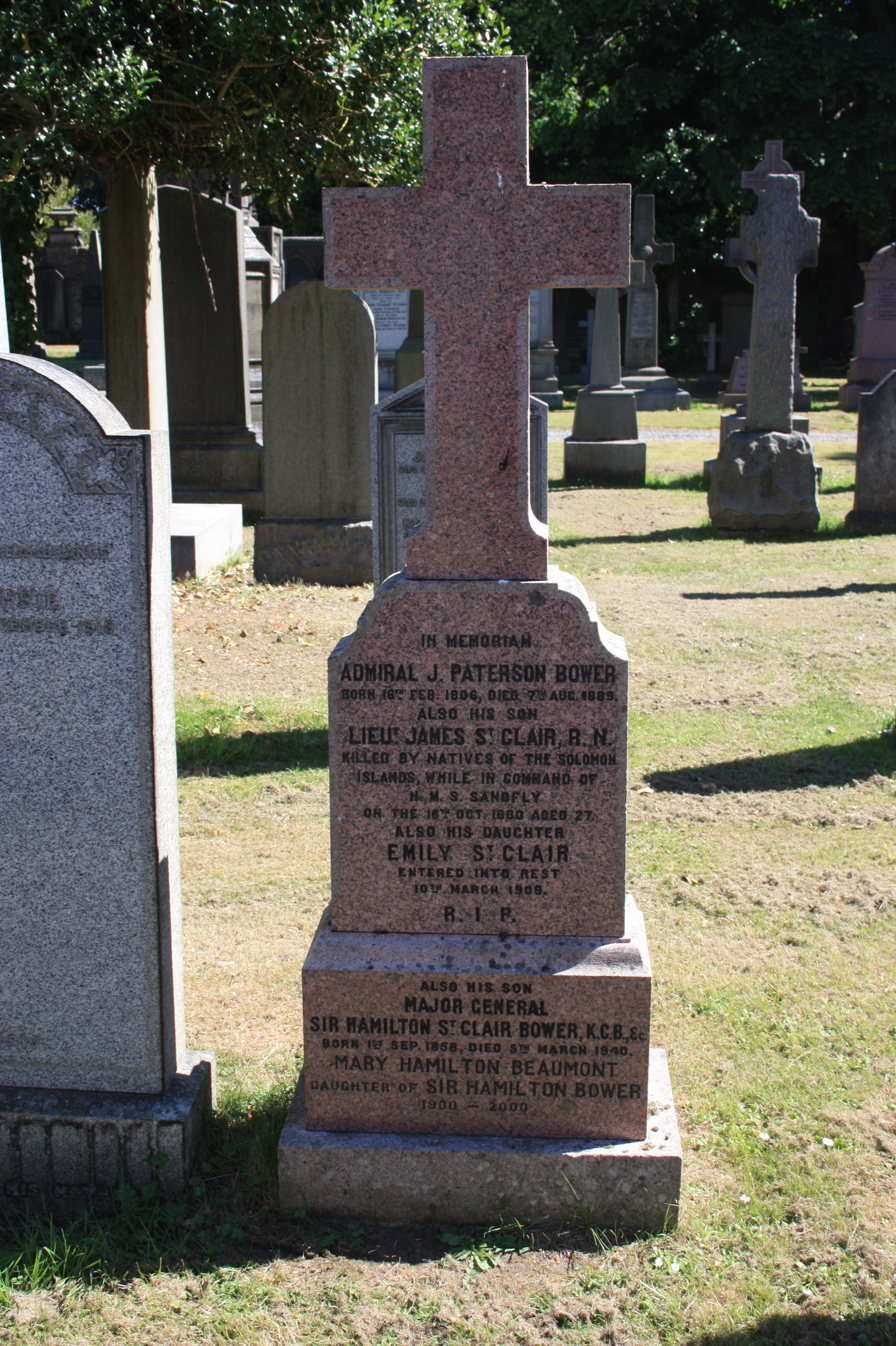
The grave of Major General Hamilton Bower, Dean Cemetery

Major-General Sir Hamilton St Clair Bower KCB DL (1 September 1858 – 5 March 1940) was a British Indian Army officer who wrote about his travels through Xinjiang and Tibet.

== Private life ==
Bower was born on Portsea Island, Hampshire, the son of a Scottish father Admiral James Paterson Bower (1806–1889) of Inverarity, Forfarshire, and an Irish mother, Barbara Hickson. He was educated at Edinburgh Collegiate School and the Royal Naval School, New Cross. His father had retired to 4 Moredun Crescent in Edinburgh.

Originally commissioned into the Duke of Edinburgh's Own Artillery Militia, he was appointed a Second Lieutenant in the Devonshire Regiment 23 October 1880. He was appointed to the Indian Staff Corps 2 February 1884 and posted to the 17th Cavalry 15 September 1885.

He is buried with his parents in Dean Cemetery in Edinburgh. The grave lies in the first north extension close to the main east–west path.

== Personal life ==
He married firstly, Mary Sherrard in Simla, India in 1894. He married secondly, Maud Edith Ainslie in Shanghai in 1889. He had three daughters.

== Sanskrit medical manuscript ==
In 1889-1890 Lieutenant Hamilton Bower travelled through Chinese Turkestan, where in the city of Kucha he purchased a Sanskrit-language manuscript written in the Brahmi alphabet. The medical manuscript, which later became known as the Bower Manuscript, sent a shock-wave through the world of Indian scholarship, especially Indology, pointing to the existence of a forgotten Buddhist civilization in Chinese Turkestan.

During his time in Turkestan, Bower, who was then a British intelligence officer on a Government mission, attempted to track down the killer of Andrew Dalgleish, a Scottish trader murdered on the road from Leh to Yarkand in 1888.

In the 1890s Bower travelled to Tibet and wrote a memoir of his experiences entitled Diary of a Journey across Tibet. In 1894 he received the Royal Geographical Society's Founder's Medal "for his remarkable journey across Tibet, from west to east".

== Later military career ==
Bower served as D.A.Q.M.G (Intelligence) from 18 April 1893 to 4 May 1895. He served in the Dongola Expedition 1896 as D.A.Q.M.G (Intelligence) and was rewarded with a Brevet of Major.

He raised and commanded the 1st Chinese Regiment at Wei-hei-Wei in 1898, and was in China during the Boxer Rebellion in 1900, where he was in command of the regiment as they took part in the relief of Tientsin and the relief of Peking. After the end of hostilities, he was from 21 July to 30 November 1901 the delegate of the British military commander (Major-General O'Moore Creagh) on the provisional government. For his services during the rebellion, he was mentioned in dispatches (by Maj.-General Creagh) and received the brevet rank of lieutenant-colonel.

He was appointed Commander of the Legation Guard in Peking on 1 December 1901, and served as such until 24 November 1906. Appointed Brevet Colonel 10 February 1904. Appointed Squadron Commander, 17th Cavalry 15 October 1906, promoted Lieutenant-Colonel 23 October 1906. In January 1908 he was the second in command of the 17th Cavalry.

Promoted Colonel 1 December 1908 and temporary Brigadier-general commanding the Dehra Ismail Khan Brigade and subsequently the Assam Brigade. Promoted Major-General 15 February 1909 and appointed a Companion of the Order of the Bath CB in October 1910.

He was the General Officer Commanding for the Abor Expedition and was rewarded with promotion to Knight Commander of the Order of the Bath KCB.

He retired a Major General on 30 January 1914.

He was appointed temporary Lieutenant-Colonel and commandant of the Haddington Volunteer Regiment 1 September 1916. He relinquished his commission on 26 February 1920 and was granted the honorary rank of Lieutenant-Colonel.

== List of publications ==
- Some notes on Tibetan affairs. Calcutta: Office of the Superintendent of Government Printing, India, 1893.
- Diary of a journey across Tibet. London: Rivington, Percival and Co., 1894.
- The Bower Manuscript : facsimile leaves, Nagari transcript, romanised transliteration and English trans. with notes. Calcutta : Off. of the Superintendent of Govt. Printing, 1894. co-authored with A. F. Rudolf Hoernle
- "A trip to Turkistan". Geographical Journal. 1895. 241–257
- "The Abor Expedition: Geographical Results: Discussion". Geographical Journal, Feb., 1913, vol. 41, no. 2, pp. 109–114. co-authored with L. A. Bethell and Thomas Holdich
