= Weihaiwei Regiment =

1st Chinese Regiment (Weihaiwei Regiment)
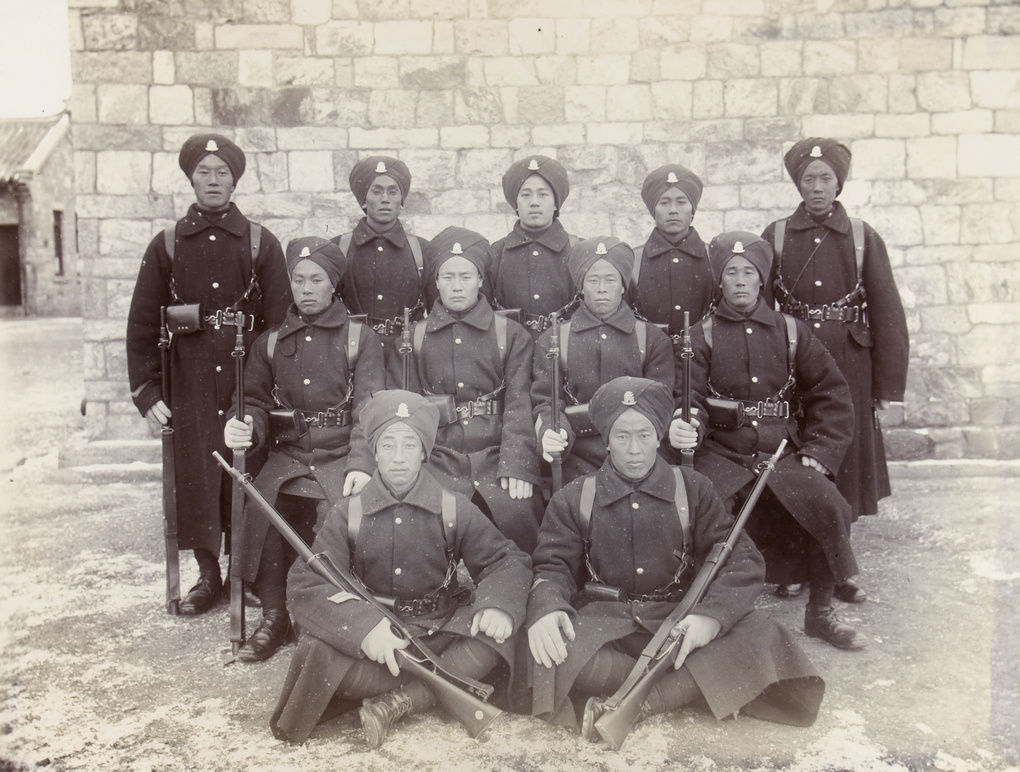
- Guard, 1st Chinese Regiment, Weihaiwei, China, ca.1902–1903
- Active: 1898–1906
- Country: British Weihaiwei
- Branch: British Colonial Auxiliary Forces
- Garrison/HQ: Matou, Weihaiwei
- Engagements: Gaselee Expedition; Battle of Tientsin

Commanders
- Colonel of the Regiment: Hamilton Bower
- Notable commanders: Hamilton Bower (1898 to 1907); Clarence Dalrymple Bruce (1902 to 1907)

The 1st Chinese Regiment, also known as the Weihaiwei Regiment, was a British Colonial Auxiliary Forces regiment raised in British Weihaiwei. The regiment, which was praised for its performance, consisted of Chinese enlisted men serving under British officers.

== Formation ==
The 1st Chinese Regiment was created in 1898 from men of Shantung Province led by British officers and Colour Sergeants. Army Order No 2 of 1899 approved the raising of a Chinese regiment of 1,000 men. Major Hamilton Bower of the Indian Staff Corps was given the local rank of lieutenant colonel and appointed Commandant of the new regiment. British officers started to arrive in late 1898 and the regiment first appeared in the Army List, preceded by the Hong Kong Regiment (not to be confused with the later Royal Hong Kong Regiment), in January 1899.

The Regiment was highly regarded for its drill, military appearance and marksmanship.

By 1900 the Regiment consisted of 420 men organised into seven companies.

== Active Service ==
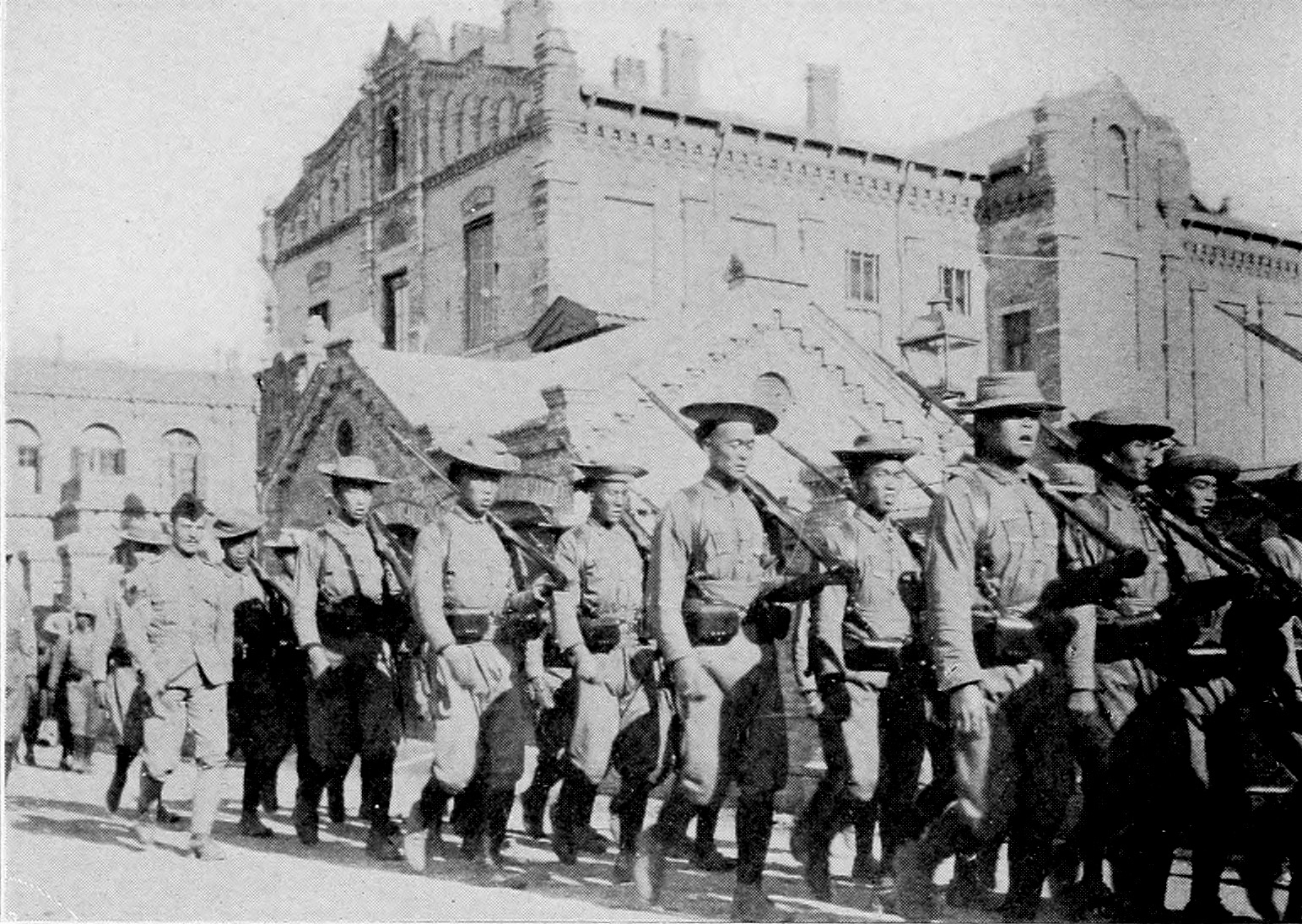
The Regiment on active service during the Boxer Rebellion

In its first action in March 1900, 420 men of the regiment led by Lt Col. Bower quelled a failed uprising in Chengfoo without bloodshed.

The Regiment sent 200 men in four companies led by Lt Col. Bower to serve in the Boxer Rebellion, arriving in Tianjin on 24 June 1900. The men of the regiment fought alongside United States Marines led by Smedley Butler. Two British captains and 21 Chinese NCOs and other ranks were killed, two majors, one colour sergeant and 15 Chinese NCOs and other ranks were wounded during this campaign. Two members of the regiment, Colour Sergeant Purdon and Sergeant Gi Dien Kwee were awarded the Distinguished Conduct Medal in the Boxer Rebellion. Gi received this medal following a mention in dispatches for “ leading a half-company without a European officer in charge during a heated battle in Tianjin.

The regiment was alerted to be deployed to Chemulpo in Korea but the movement did not eventuate.

A party of one British colour sergeant and 12 men travelled to London in 1902 to represent the regiment at the Coronation of King Edward VII and Queen Alexandra.

By 1902 the regiment consisted of over 1200 men organised into 12 companies.

== Uniform and insignia ==
Upon formation in 1898 the Weihaiwei Regiment wore a medium blue uniform with Chinese style headdress and white leggings. By 1900 this had been replaced for parade dress by a black turban, dark-blue/grey (almost black) tunic, breeches and puttees. The tunic was double-breasted with two rows of brass buttons. For ordinary duties and active service, khaki drill was worn with a straw wide-brimmed hat modelled on that worn by the Royal Navy at the time. A red waist sash was worn with both blue and khaki uniforms. According to Barbara-Sue White, the turbans worn by members of the 1st Chinese Regiment were an adoption of those worn by Sikhs.

Following the regiments much-praised actions and conduct during the anti-Boxer campaign of 1900 the regiment received permission to wear new regimental headgear and collar badges made of brass, representing the Drum Tower of Tientsin (Tianjin)

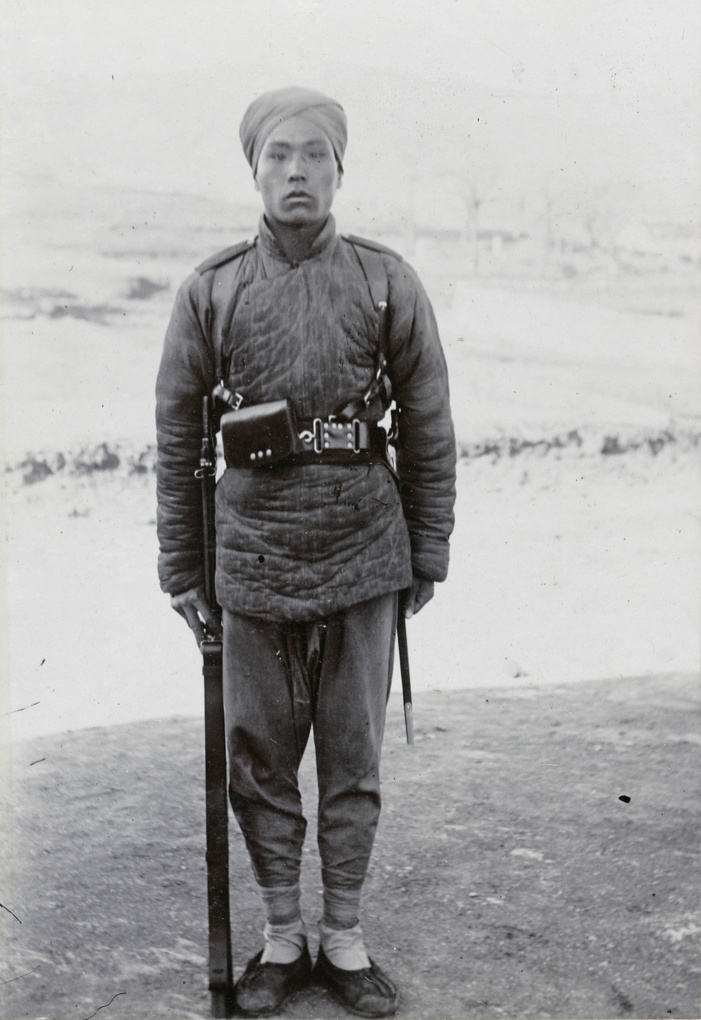
Recruit, circa winter of 1901

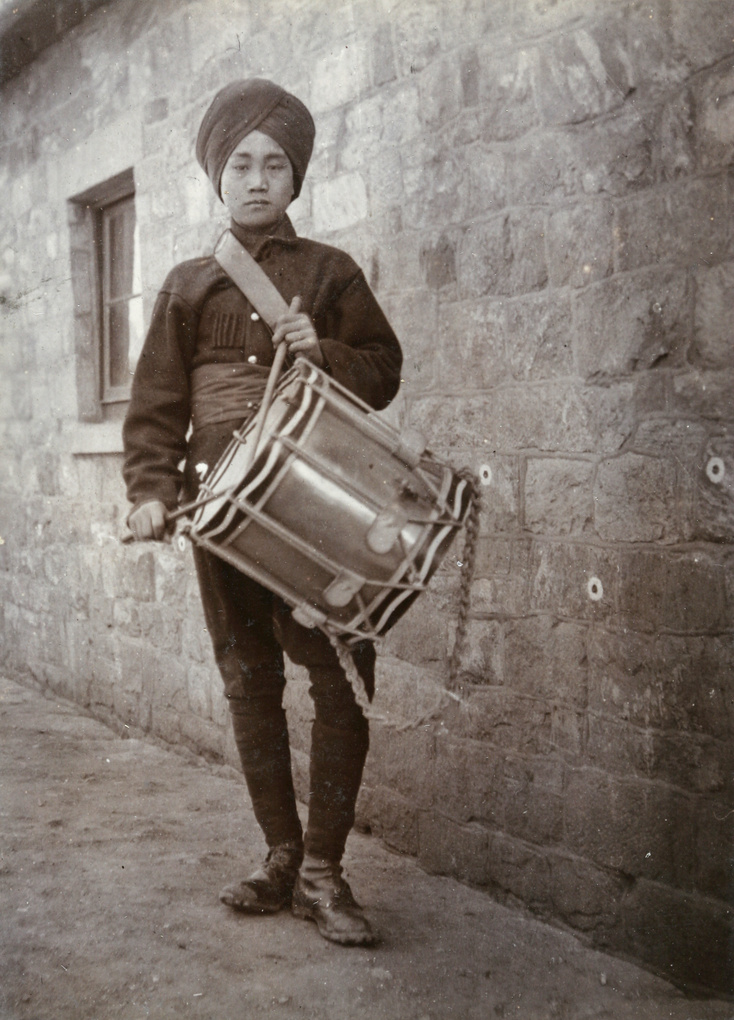
Drummer boy, ca.1901

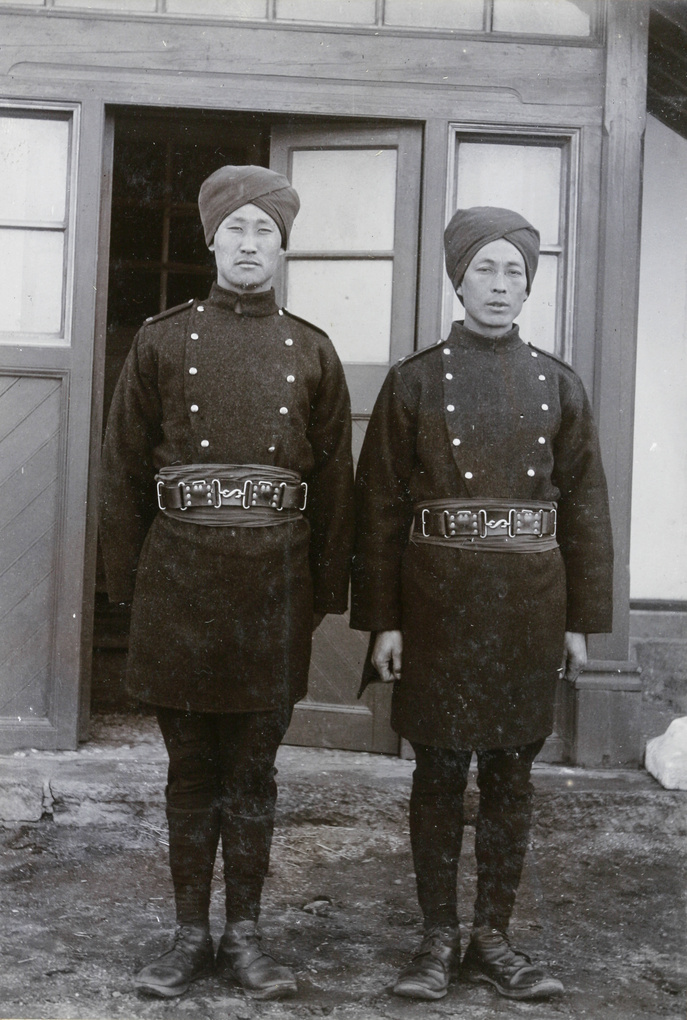
Orderlies, ca.1901

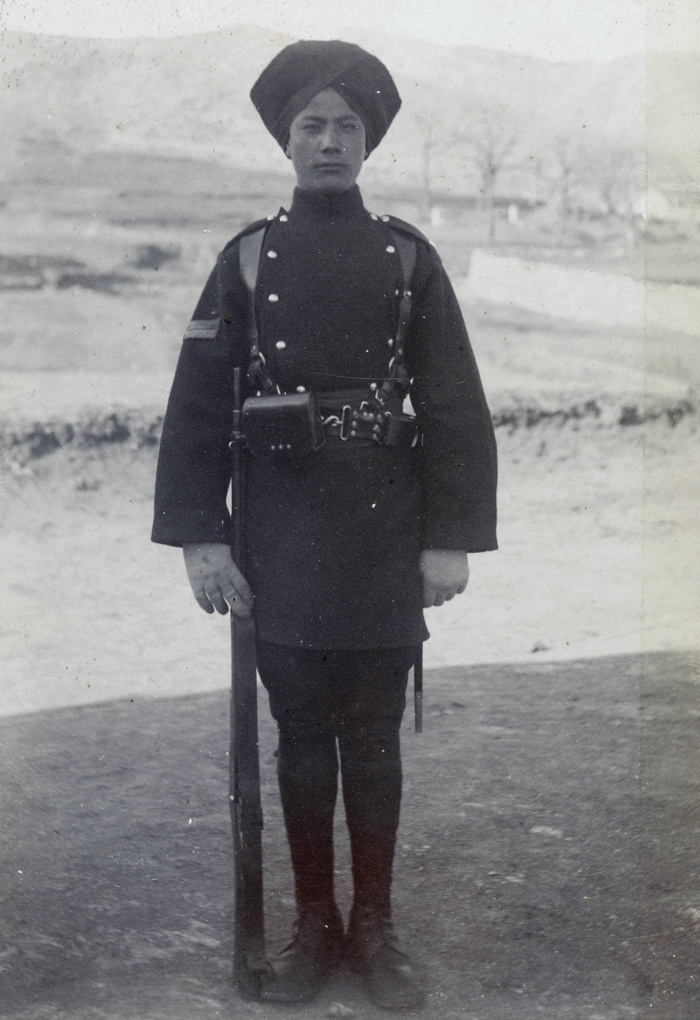
Corporal, ca.1900

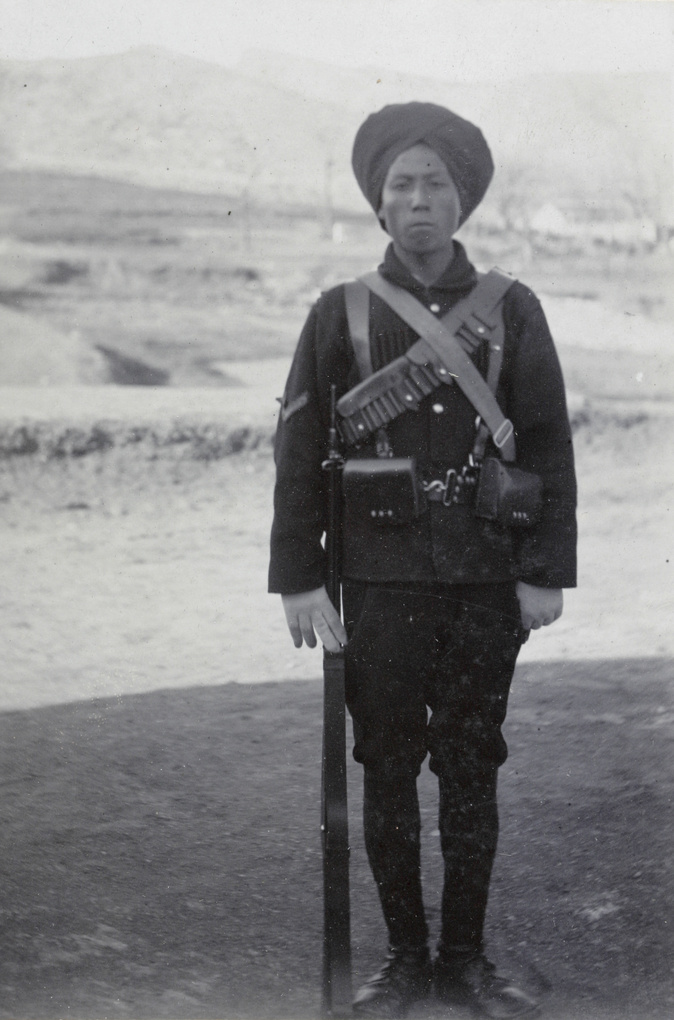
Lance Corporal, ca.1900

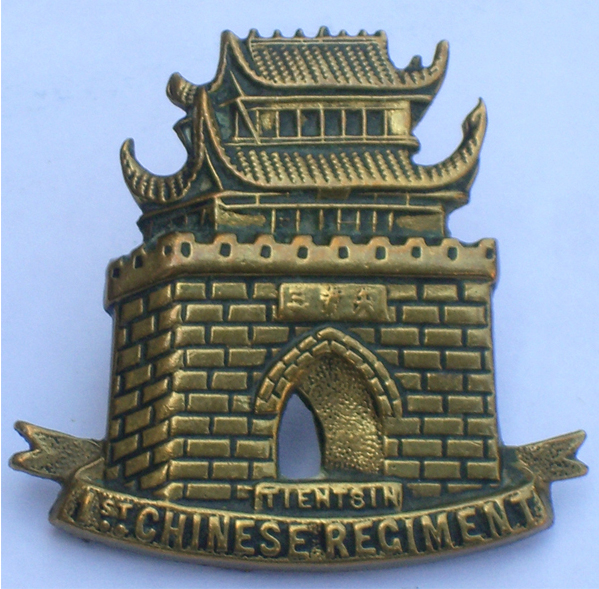
Regimental collar badge

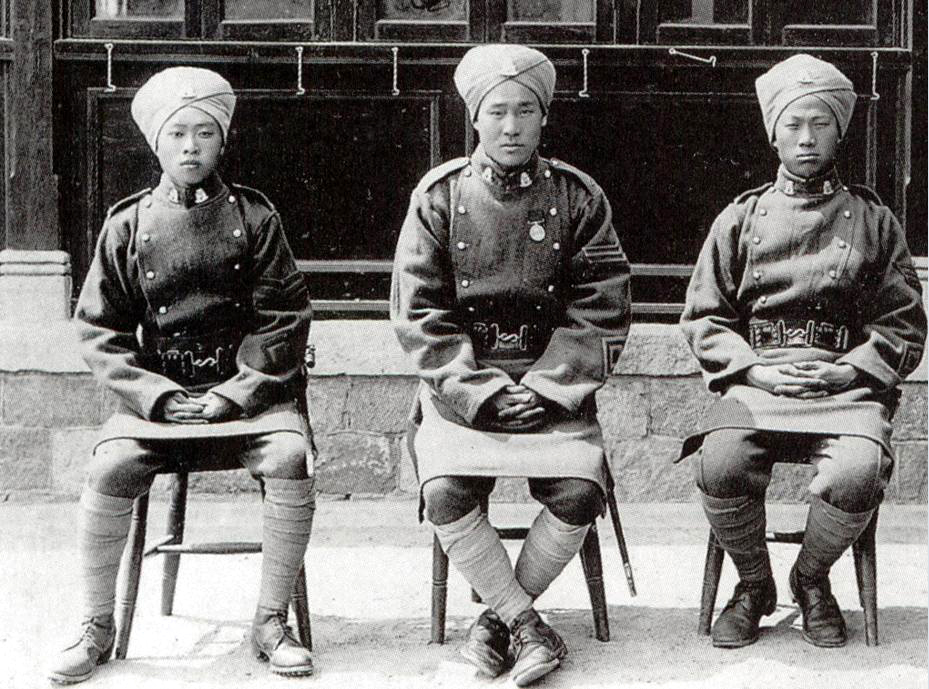
Sergeant Gi Dien Kwee D.C.M seated centre

== Disbandment ==
When it was decided to run the territory under civil, rather than military lines at the end of 1901, the first stage of disbandment was begun. The regiment was reduced from 1,200 to 500 men through natural wastage and a freeze on recruitment, retaining 16 officers and six NCOs organised into four companies.

In spite of its excellent record the regiment was ordered to be totally disbanded on 1 June 1906 by Army Order No.127 of 1906. The reason appears to have been primarily a financial one, after the decision was made not to develop Weihaiwei as a naval base.

== Further service from members of the Regiment ==
Some of the soldiers were retained as a permanent police force with three of the British Colour Sergeants commissioned as police inspectors. In 1910 the police force was commanded by three European Inspectors, Colour Sergeants Purdon, Alfred Whittaker and Young. The remainder of the force consisted of 55 Chinese Constables,

The original second-in-command (2IC) and later commander of the Regiment, Colonel Clarence Dalrymple Bruce, became Captain Superintendent commanding the Shanghai Municipal Police from 1907 to 1913.

Other former non-commissioned Chinese members of the regiment following disbandment were enlisted in a special unit of railway police responsible for the security of Imperial Railways of North China stations and other railway facilities.

During the First World War, the Chinese Labour Corps was recruited in Weihaiwei for service in France. The unit's commanding officer was Colonel Bryan Charles Fairfax who had served as a lieutenant with the Chinese Regiment in the Boxer Rebellion, the unit's 2IC was Major Purdon, who was later promoted to colonel and succeeded Colonel Fairfax.
