= Betty Joel =

British furniture, textile and interior designer (1894–1985)

- Betty Joel
- Born: Mary Stewart-Lockhart; June 7, 1894; Hong Kong
- Died: January 21, 1985 (aged 90); Andover, Hampshire, United Kingdom
- Occupations: Furniture, textile and interior designer
- Years active: 1921–1937
- Notable work: Daily Express Building, St Olaf House
- Movement: Art Deco

Betty Joel (née Mary Stewart Lockhart; 7 June 1894 – 21 January 1985, Hampshire) was a British furniture, textile and interior designer, active in England from c. 1921 until 1937. Her work was featured in The Studio, the illustrated fine arts and decorative arts magazine, from 1927 to 1937. Examples of her work can be seen in the Victoria & Albert Museum, London and the Geffrye Museum, London.

== Early life ==
Mary Stewart Lockhart was born in Hong Kong on 7 June 1894, to Edith Louise Rider (née Hancock) (1870–1950) and James Stewart Lockhart, KCMG, LLD (1858–1937) a colonial administrator. She was called Betty from a young age. The young Betty spent her childhood in Asia and attended school in Britain for five years in her teens. She met her future husband, David Joel (1891–1973), a naval officer in Ceylon, and they married in 1918. She used the name Betty Joel during her marriage.

== Career ==
The Joels moved to Britain together after the end of the First World War and built a cottage at Hayling Island in Hampshire.

I personally began to design furniture because I despaired of trying to adapt old furniture to the needs of my own entirely modern house.

Friends admired the new furniture and asked the couple to make them pieces. Without any formal training, in 1921, she started her own business Betty Joel Ltd. with her husband David Joel, with a furniture workshop, initially located on Hayling Island and retailing through her shop in Sloane Street. Joel began to design furniture, using the expertise of the local craftsmen from around local area who had previously worked as yacht fitters and specialised the traditional boat building woods, oak and teak.

The designs were first retailed through their showroom in London at 177 Sloane Street and then at 25 Knightsbridge. The larger premises allowed them to show a wider range of items and to hold art exhibitions. Exhibitions included rugs by Ivan da Silva Bruhns, the French artist, drawings by Matisse and paintings by Marie Laurencin.

She began to design her own rugs which she had made in Tianjin, China and textiles which were manufactured in France. Her work in both furniture and textiles was distinctive for the use of curved lines and curvilinear shapes.

Joel featured in a Daily Mirror a series in 1936 which asked "who are the ten young men and women shaping the future?"

In 1938 she created a study for Lord Mountbatten's Park Lane, London home and a bedroom for the 2nd Countess of Iveagh at Elveden Hall. Other commissions included work for the Savoy and the St James's Palace Hotel, and for the then Duchess of York.

With the breakdown of their marriage in 1939, Betty retired from the design business and did not work again. David Joel continued the business renaming it David Joel Ltd.

== Legacy ==
An Art Deco bed headboard designed by Betty Joel in 1929 was featured in a 2013 episode of the BBC's Antiques Road Trip (series 7, episode 16).

Clive Stewart-Lockhart, her great-nephew and a former Antiques Roadshow expert, is set to publish a brand new biography of Joel, featuring a foreword by Paul Atterbury in 2025, to mark the 40th anniversary of her death.

== Exhibitions ==
- London: Royal Academy of Arts (1935), Exhibition of British Art in Industry
- New York: Metropolitan Museum of Art (1937), Rugs and carpets: An International Exhibition of Contemporary Industrial Art
- Brighton: Royal Pavilion, Art Gallery & Museums (1975) British Carpets and Designs: The Modernist Rug 1928-1938 cat no 8
- Kingston Museum, (2025), Kingston Glamour: Art, Innovation and the Suburbs
