= Andrew Dalgleish (trader) =

Scottish trader active in Central and South Asia

Andrew Dalgleish (1853 – 1888, on Karakoram Pass, between Ladakh, India and China) was a Scottish trader, traveller and government agent during the Great Game.

== Life and murder ==
He took part in the first trading venture of the Central Asian Trading Company, the company having been set up in 1873 with the encouragement of Robert Barkely Shaw. Dalgleish was one of the first British traders in Ladakh, engaged in trans-Karakoram trade in the 1870s and 1880s. He married a Yarkandi wife. He had for some years traded between Yarkand and Leh and he was fluent in Uyghur.

Dalgleish was murdered by an Afghan named Dad Mahomed, a Kakar Pathan from Quetta who was once a merchant but had gone bankrupt. According to Hamilton Bower, in May 1888 Dalgleish, accompanied by some pilgrims and servants, left Leh for Yarkand. Several days into their journey they were joined by Mahomed. On 8 April 1888 the party crossed the Karakoram Pass and set up some tents to rest. While drinking tea in a tent Dalgleish and Mahomed had a conversation regarding Mahomed's debts. Mahomed excused himself and then returned with a gun and fired into the tent, striking Dalgleish in the shoulder. Dalgleish escaped from the tent but Mahomed pursued him with a sword and killed him. Mahomed did not immediately flee but instead forced Dalgleish's servants to make him a meal, then he slept in his victim's tent. The next day Mahomed departed and Dalgleish's servants and pilgrims made their way to Yarkand. The British community in Yarkand expressed their outrage over the murder and pleaded with the local yamen to have the murderer arrested. Mahomed later arrived in Kashgar and despite pleas from the Russian Consul Nikolai Petrovsky local officials refused to arrest Mahomed.

During his travels through Qing China's Xinjiang Province from 1889–90, British military officer Hamilton Bower attempted without success to pursue Dalgleish's killer. Mahomed was arrested in 1890 in Samarkand (then Russia) and committed suicide in prison.

A small memorial made of marble slab was erected by Bower on the desolate site of his death. It read in English and Persian, "Here fell Andrew Dalgleish, murdered by an Afghan, April 6th, 1888."

His resting place is in a Christian cemetery in Leh, Ladakh.
