= Cairns rainbowfish =

Conservation status
- Endangered (IUCN 3.1)

Scientific classification
- Kingdom: Animalia
- Phylum: Chordata
- Class: Actinopterygii
- Order: Atheriniformes
- Family: Melanotaeniidae
- Genus: Cairnsichthys
- Species: C. rhombosomoides

Binomial name
- Cairnsichthys rhombosomoides (Nichols & Raven, 1928)

Synonyms
- Rhadinocentrus rhombosomoides Nichols & Raven, 1928

Species of fish

The Cairns rainbowfish (Cairnsichthys rhombosomoides) is a species of rainbowfish endemic to Australia. This species is endemic to the wet tropics of north eastern Queensland from the Daintree River and Cape Tribulation in the north south to Innisfail where its occurs in shallow, fast flowing, shady streams over sandy substrates where the roots of trees, woody debris, leaf litter, undercut banks and hydrophytes provide cover.
