= Huancui, Weihai =

Huancui 环翠区
- District
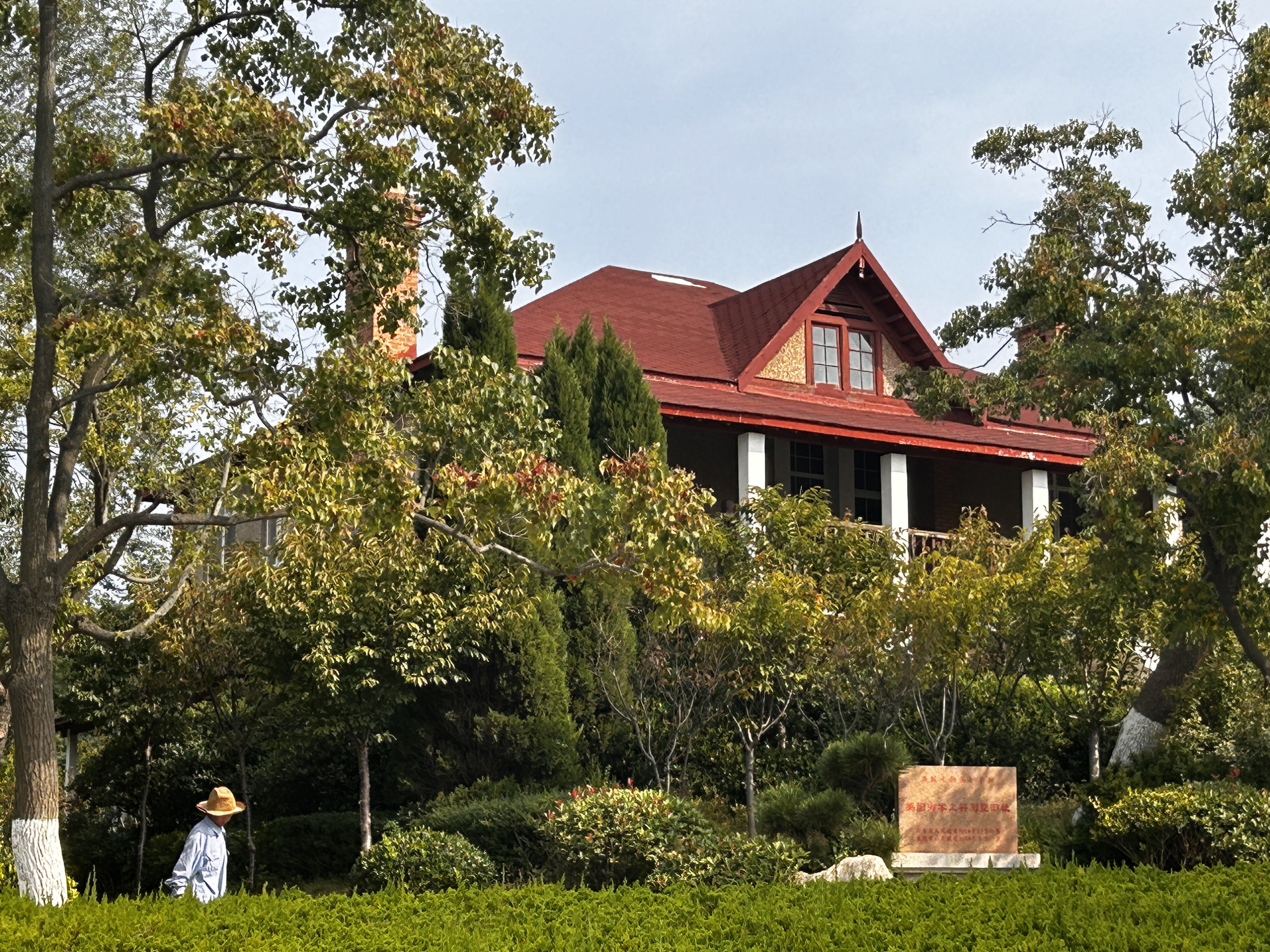
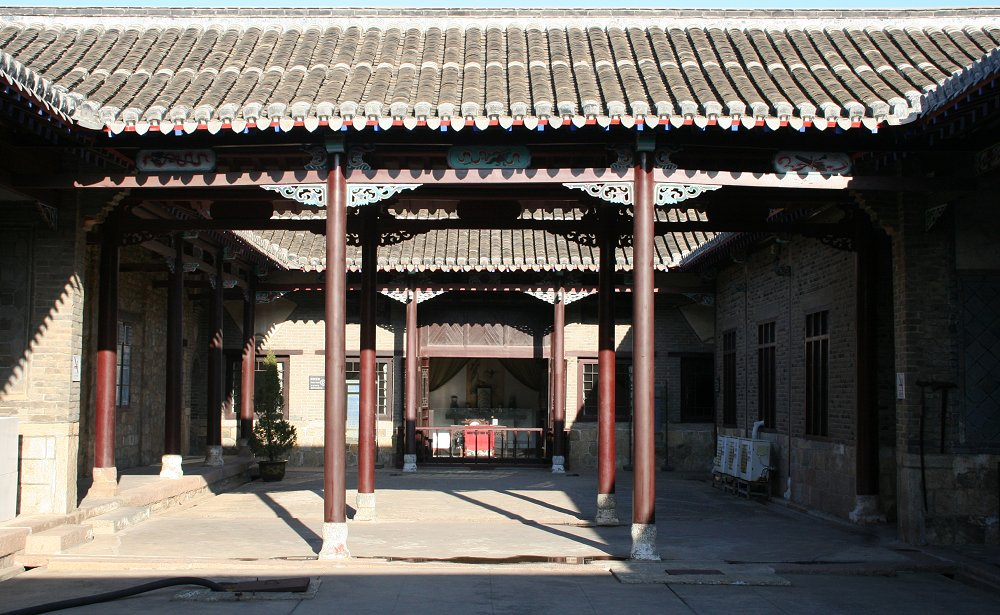
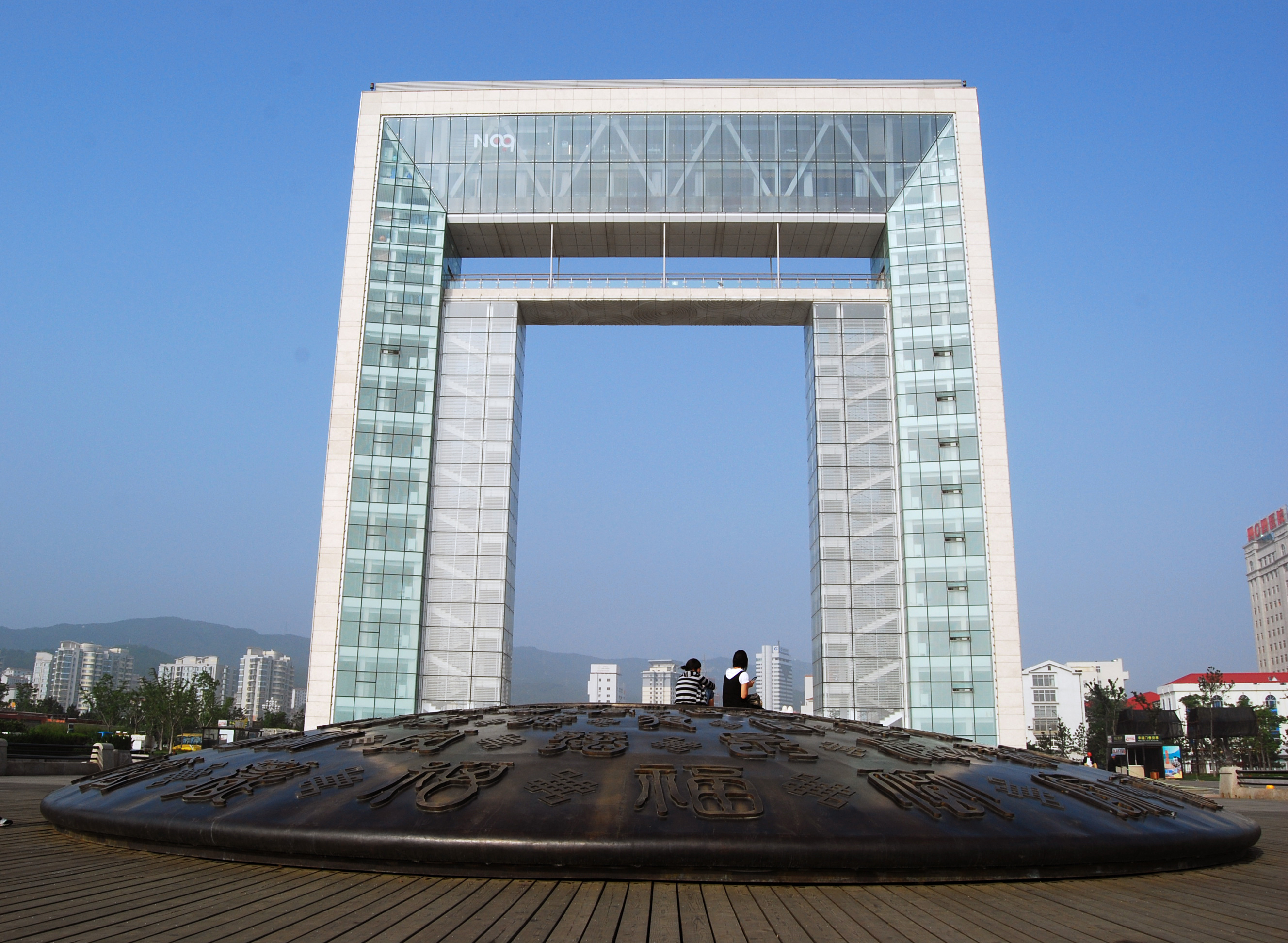
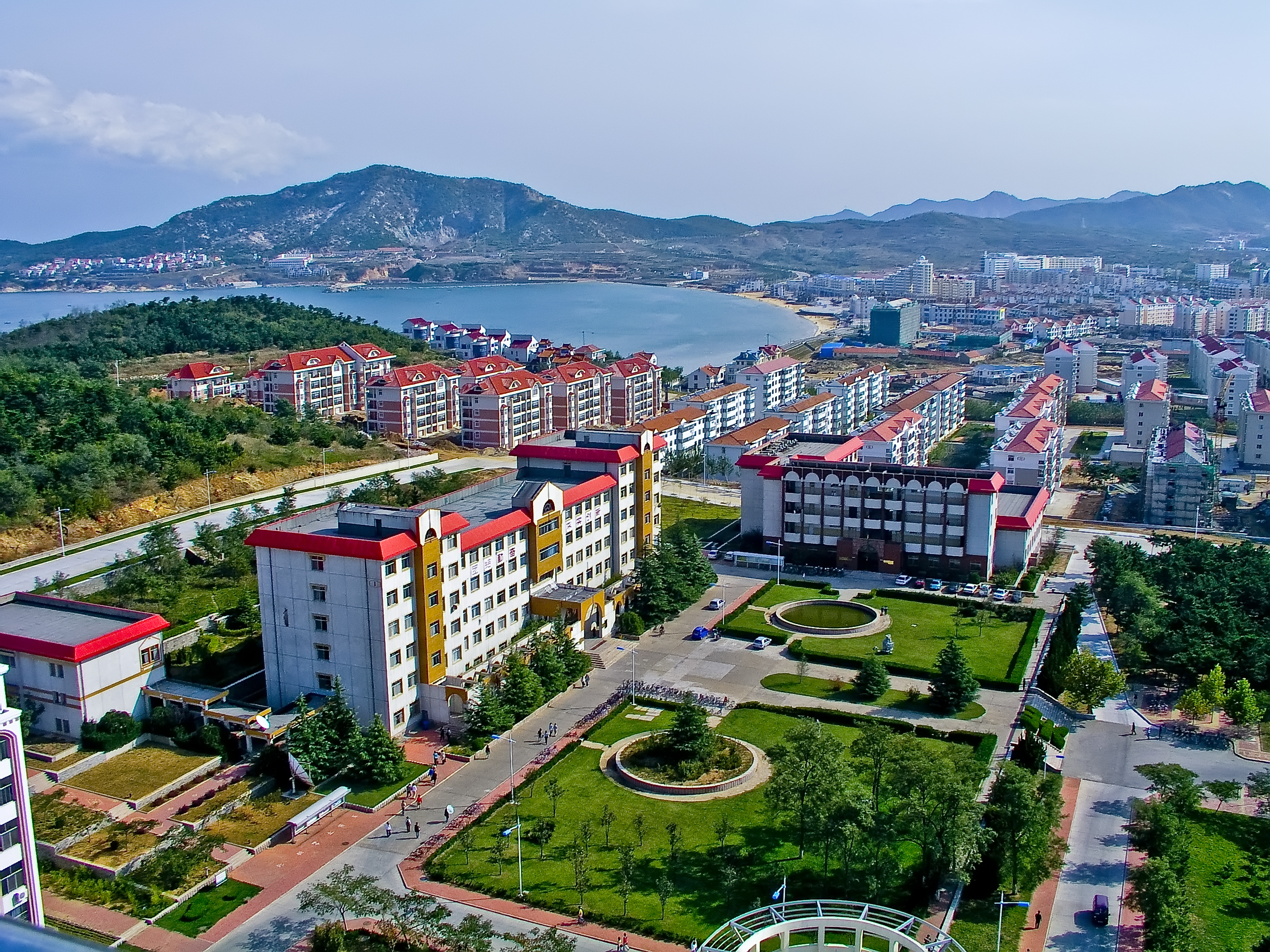
- British colonial mansion Former headquarter of Beiyang Fleet Gate of Happiness SDU Weihai

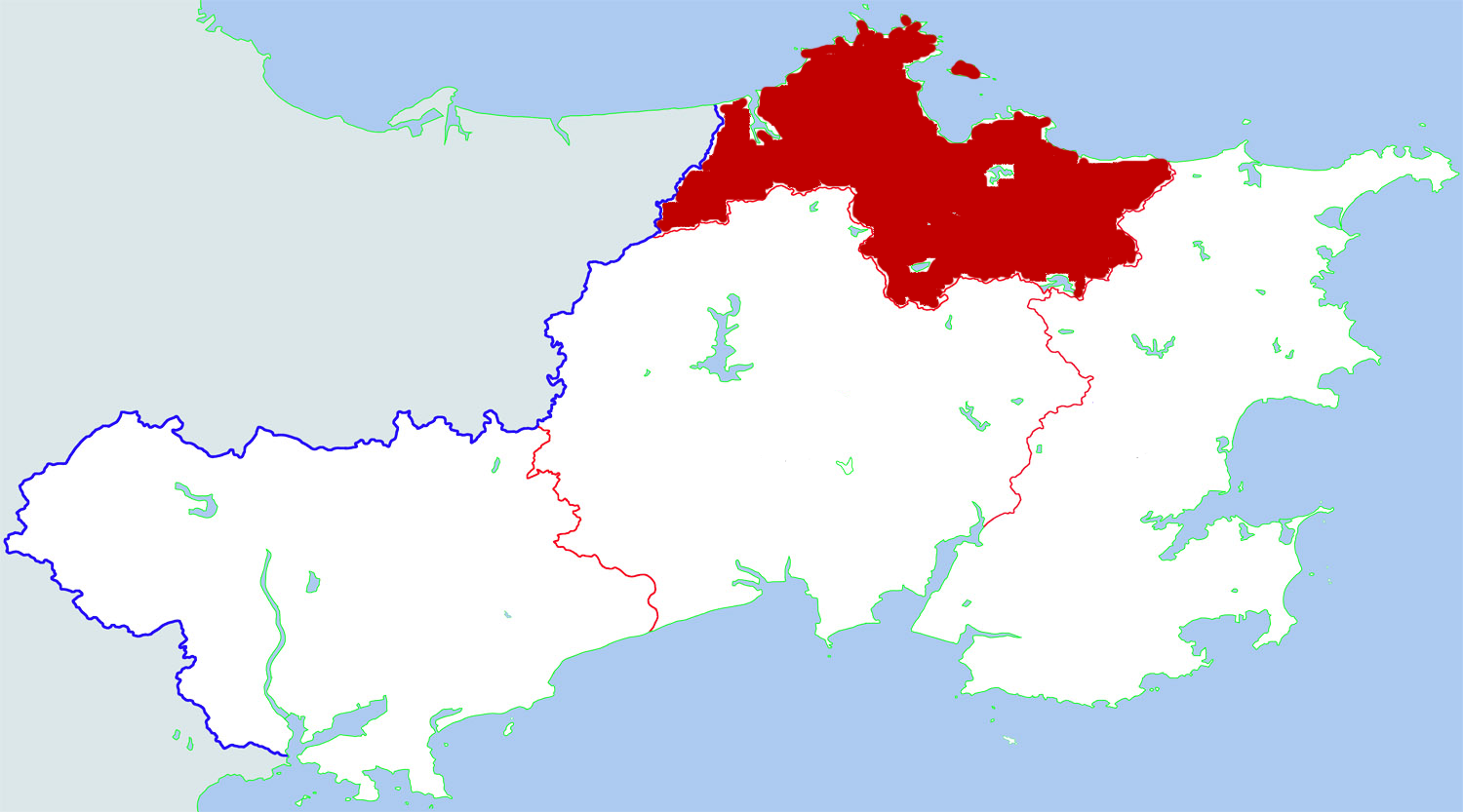
- Huancui in Weihai

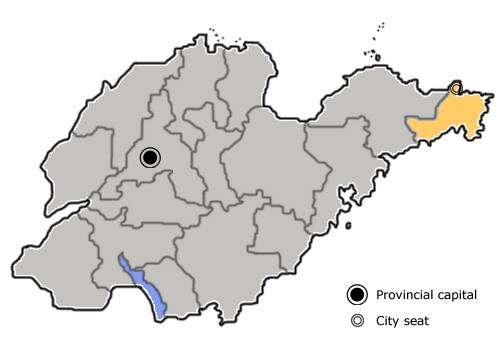
- Weihai in Shandong
- Coordinates (Huancui government): 37°30′07″N 122°07′23″E
- Country: People's Republic of China
- Province: Shandong
- Prefecture-level city: Weihai

Area
  - Total: 991 km^{2} (383 sq mi)

Population (2019)
  - Total: 368,500
  - Density: 372/km^{2} (963/sq mi)
- Time zone: UTC+8 (China Standard)
- Postal code: 264200
- Website: www.huancui.gov.cn/Index.html

Huancui (Chinese: 环翠; pinyin: Huáncuì) is a district and the seat of the city of Weihai, Shandong province, China.

== History ==
In 1398, the Hongwu Emperor launched an initiative to counteract raiding wokou, which involved sending imperial troops to the area of present-day Huancui to defend the coast.

The city of Weihaiwei and nearby Liugong Island were forcibly leased to British forces from 1898 to 1930 as British Weihaiwei.

The area was liberated from Japanese forces in August 1945.

On June 15, 1987, Weihai was expanded from a county-level city to a prefecture-level city, and the area of the county-level city became contemporary Huancui District.

== Geography ==
Huancui District is relatively low in elevation, with only a few peaks rising above 500 metres (1,600 ft) in height. The district's southern edge lies along the eastern portion of the Jiaolai Plains.

=== Climate ===
The district has a continental climate, with four seasons and relatively moderate temperatures. The district experiences an average annual temperature of 12 °C (54 °F), an average annual precipitation of 737.7 millimetres (29.04 in), and 2,480.0 average hours of sunshine per year.

== Administrative divisions ==
As of 2020, Huancui District is divided to five subdistricts and three towns. These township-level divisions are then divided into 102 residential communities and 62 administrative villages.

=== Subdistricts ===
The district's five subdistricts are Huancuilou Subdistrict, Jingyuan Subdistrict, Zhudao Subdistrict, Sunjiatuan Subdistrict, and Songshan Subdistrict.

=== Towns ===
The district's three towns are Zhangcun, Yangting, and Wenquan.

== Economy ==
Huancui District recorded a gross domestic product of ¥37.603 billion in 2019, which grew at an annual increase of 3.2%. The district's primary sector shrunk 1.1% in 2019, accounting for ¥3.028 billion, or 8.1% of the economy. The district's secondary sector grew 5.0% in 2019, accounting for ¥12.076 billion, or 32.1% of the economy. The district's tertiary sector grew 2.6% in 2019, accounting for ¥22.499 billion, or 59.8% of the economy. The district's official urban unemployment rate in 2019 was 0.67%.

=== Shipbuilding ===
China Merchants Group CMI (former AVIC) Weihai Shipyards is located in Huancui. Shipbuilding at the site began in April 1951.

=== Aquaculture ===
As of 2019, Huancui District has the largest aquaculture sector in Weihai, and the sector grew 10.7% that year. In 2019, the district's aquaculture sector attracted ¥3.173 billion of investment, and the district government began a collaboration with Shandong University's Weihai Campus to promote industry research in the district.

=== Foreign trade ===
The district conducts a significant amount of foreign trade, totaling ¥21.57 billion in 2019. Of this, 15.75 ¥billion was in exports, and ¥5.82 billion was in imports. In 2019, 18.4% of the district's exports were to South Korea, 17.9% went to the European Union, 17.3% went to Japan, 13.1% went to the United States, and the remaining 33.3% went to other trading partners. 43.1% of the district's exports in 2019 were textiles and apparel, 18.0% of the district's exports were electronics and machinery, 5.5% of the district's exports were agricultural goods, and the remaining 33.4% of exports were in other sectors.
