= Daintree rainbowfish =

Conservation status
- Critically Endangered (IUCN 3.1)

Scientific classification
- Kingdom: Animalia
- Phylum: Chordata
- Class: Actinopterygii
- Order: Atheriniformes
- Family: Melanotaeniidae
- Genus: Cairnsichthys
- Species: C. bitaeniatus

Binomial name
- Cairnsichthys bitaeniatus Allen, Hammer & Raadik, 2018

Species of fish

The Daintree rainbowfish (Cairnsichthys bitaeniatus) is a species of rainbowfish endemic to Australia. This species is endemic to the wet tropics of north eastern Queensland where it has been recorded from the Cooper Creek and nearby Hutchinson Creek systems of the Daintree region of north-eastern Queensland. It was discovered as an isolated population in the Daintree rainforest and was originally thought to be the Cairns rainbowfish (C. rhombosomoides) but it was defined as its own species in 2018.

This species occurs in small clear, shady rainforest streams which flow over a substrate consisting of rock, sand, gravel and log debris. Within these streams the fishes swim near the surface to midwater depths and are frequently found in the deeper pools of these streams where there is a faster current. They will form mixed schools with blue-eyes and other rainbowfishes.

As of 2019, it has been listed as Critically Endangered by the IUCN. In 2023, it was also listed as Critically Endangered by the Australian Government under the EPBC Act however there is no Recovery or Threat Abatement Plan currently in place.
