= Cairnsichthys =

Scientific classification
- Kingdom: Animalia
- Phylum: Chordata
- Class: Actinopterygii
- Order: Atheriniformes
- Family: Melanotaeniidae
- Genus: Cairnsichthys; Allen, 1980

Type species
- Rhadinocentrus rhombosomoides Nichols & Raven, 1828

Genus of fishes

Cairnsichthys is a genus of rainbowfishes from the subfamily Melanotaeniinae. The genus is endemic to freshwater streams in eastern Queensland in north eastern Australia. The genus was designated as a monotypic genus in 1928 by John T. Nichols and Henry C. Raven but in 2018 a second species was assigned to the genus.

== Species ==
- Cairnsichthys bitaeniatus Allen, Hammer & Raadik, 2018 - Daintree rainbowfish
- Cairnsichthys rhombosomoides (Nichols & Raven, 1928) - Cairns rainbowfish

== Etymology ==
The genus is named after the Australian city of Cairns with the suffix ichthys which is Greek for "fish".
