= British Weihaiwei =

British colony from 1898 to 1930

Weihaiwei 威海衛
- 1898–1930
- Flag (1903–1930)
- Anthem: God Save the Queen (1898–1901); God Save the King (1901–1930)
- British Weihaiwei in dark green Neutral zone in striped light green

- Location of Weihaiwei in Shandong
- Status: Leased territory of the United Kingdom
- Capital: Port Edward
- Common languages: English (official); Mandarin

Government
  - Monarch: Victoria (first); George V (last)
  - Commissioner: Sir Arthur Dorward (first); Sir Reginald Johnston (last)
- Historical era: New Imperialism
  - Convention for the Lease of Weihaiwei: 1 July 1898
  - Convention for the Rendition of Weihaiwei: 30 September 1930

Area
- 746 km^{2} (288 sq mi)
- Currency: Customs gold unit Hong Kong dollar (joint circulation)
Preceded by	Succeeded by
Qing Dynasty	Republic of China

British Weihaiwei
- Traditional Chinese: 威海衛
- Simplified Chinese: 威海卫
- Literal meaning: powerful sea guard
Transcriptions
Standard Mandarin
- Hanyu Pinyin: Wēihǎiwèi
- Wade–Giles: Wei^{1}-hai^{3}-wei^{4}
- IPA: [wéɪ.xàɪ.wêɪ]

Weihaiwei or Wei-hai-wei, on the northeastern coast of China, was a leased territory of the United Kingdom from 1898 until 1930. The capital was Port Edward (Huancui District, Weihai). The leased territory covered 288 square miles (750 km^{2}) and included the walled city of Weihaiwei, Port Edward just to the north, Weihaiwei Bay, Liu-kung Island and a mainland area of 72 miles (116 km) of coastline running to a depth of 10 miles (16 km) inland, an area roughly coterminous with the Huancui District of modern Weihai City. Together with Lüshunkou (Port Arthur) it controlled the entrance to the Bohai Sea and, thus, the seaward approaches to Beijing.

== Background to the British lease ==
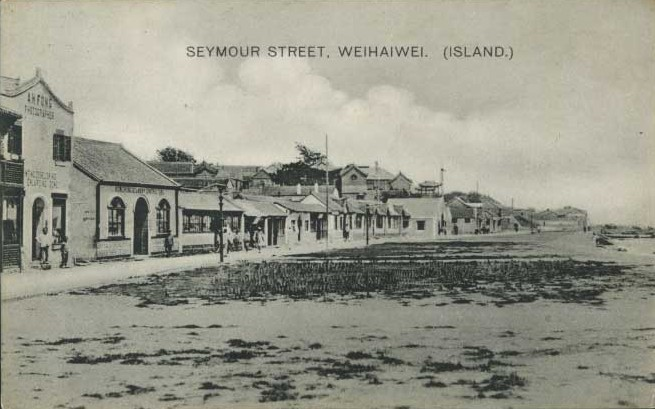
Waterfront, Seymour Street in Weihaiwei, circa 1905-1910

The port of Weihaiwei served as the base for the Chinese Beiyang Fleet (Northern Seas Fleet), founded in 1871 during the later years of the Qing dynasty in China. In 1895, Japanese land and sea forces captured the port in the Battle of Weihaiwei, the last major battle of the First Sino-Japanese War of 1894–1895. The Japanese withdrew in 1898.

On 28 March 1898, the day after the signing of a Sino-Russian convention granting a 25-year lease on Port Arthur to Russia, Sir Claude MacDonald, the British minister in Beijing, met the ministers of the Zongli Yamen to inform them that the British government was demanding the cession of Wei-Hai-Wai on terms comparable to the Russian lease. Upon the refusal of the Chinese, MacDonald informed them that Britain would not press its demand if the Chinese were to obtain the departure of the Russians from Port Arthur. Two days later, MacDonald reiterated the British demand for Wei-Hai-Wei, this time in the form of an ultimatum with a 48-hour deadline. On April 2, the Chinese gave in to the ultimatum, with the details of the lease, amongst others, that the lease on Wei-Hai-Wei would remain in force as long as the Russians occupied Port Arthur, to be settled later. The British fleet took possession and raised its flag on 24 May 1898.

The British used the port primarily as a summer anchorage for the Royal Navy's China Station and as a health resort. It also served as an occasional port of call for Royal Navy vessels in the Far East (very much secondary to using Hong Kong in southern China). Other than for military matters, local administration remained under Chinese control, and the port itself remained a free port until 1923.

At the start of the Russo-Japanese War of 1904–1905, the commander of the Royal Navy's China Station was initially ordered to withdraw his ships from Weihaiwei to avoid Britain being drawn into the conflict. However, fearing that the Imperial Russian Navy might use Weihaiwei as a safe haven, the Japanese government successfully pressured the British to return their fleet. During the war, correspondents covering the conflict used the port as a telegraph- and radio-transmission station; it also served as a source of contraband shipping for blockade-runners bringing supplies into Port Arthur.

After the Japanese victory over Russia in 1905, Japan took possession of Port Arthur. Britain extended its lease over Weihaiwei until 1930; the Japanese occupied Port Arthur from 1905 to 1945.

== British rule in Weihaiwei ==
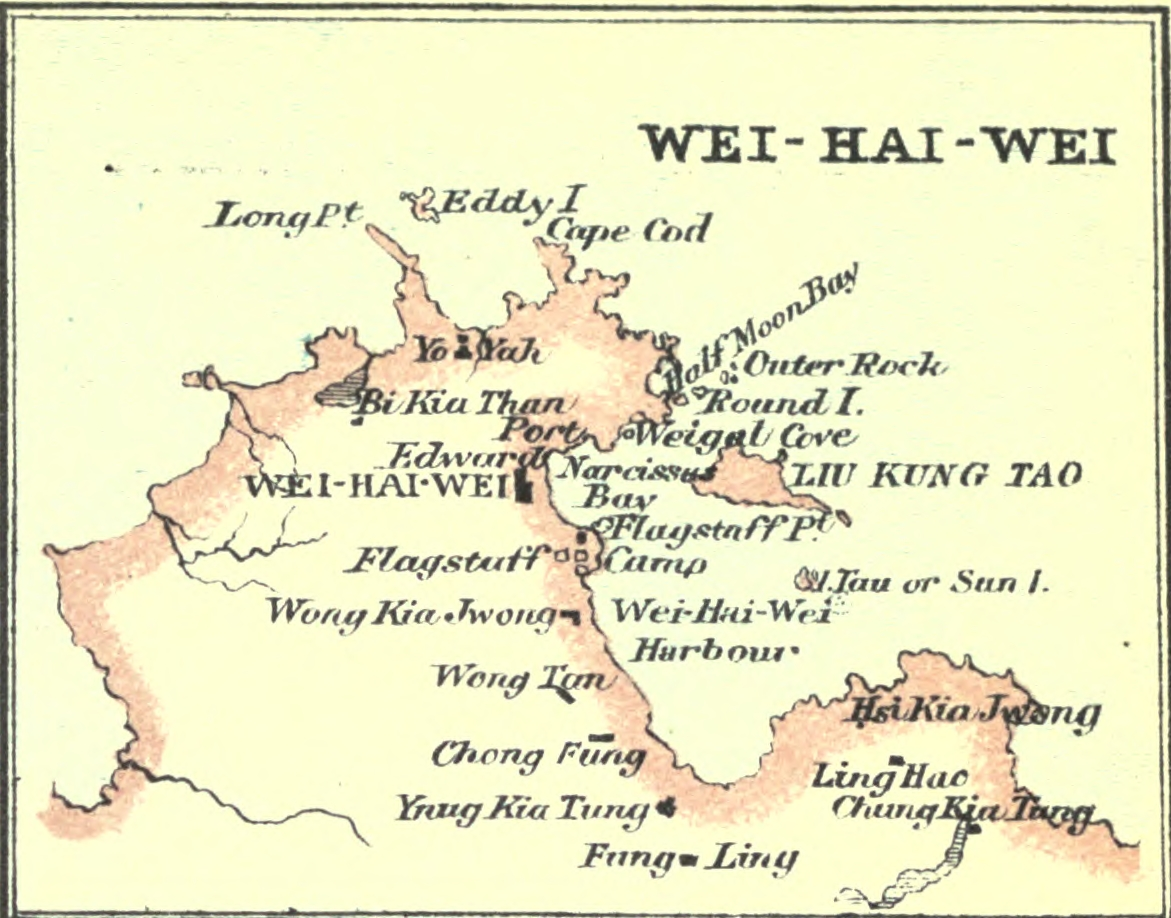
Map of Weihaiwei in 1906

The War Office were responsible for the territory as it was envisaged that it would become a naval base similar to British Hong Kong. As such, the first Commissioners of Weihaiwei were appointed from the British Army and based themselves in Liu-kung Island. At the beginning of the lease, the territory was administered by a Senior Naval Officer of the Royal Navy, Sir Edward Hobart Seymour. However a survey led by the Royal Engineers deemed that Weihaiwei was unsuitable for a major naval base or trading port. In 1899, administration was transferred to a military and civil commissioner, firstly Arthur Dorward (1899–1901), then John Dodson Daintree (1901–1902), appointed by the War Office in London. The territorial garrison consisted of 200 British troops and a specially constituted Weihaiwei Regiment, officially the 1st Chinese Regiment, with British officers. In 1901, it was decided that this base should not be fortified and administration was transferred from the War Office to the Colonial Office which allowed for civilians to be appointed as the Commissioner.

In 1909, the then Governor of Hong Kong, Sir Frederick Lugard, proposed that Britain return Weihaiwei to Chinese rule in return for perpetual rule of the New Territories of Hong Kong which had also been leased in 1898. This proposal was never adopted.

Weihaiwei was not developed in the way that Hong Kong and other British colonies in the region were. This was because Shantung Province, of which Weihaiwei was part, was inside Germany's (and after World War I, Japan's) sphere of influence. It was normal practice for British colonies to be administered under the provisions of the British Settlements Act 1887. However, Weihaiwei was actually administered under the Foreign Jurisdiction Act 1890 which was the law which granted extraterritorial powers over British subjects in China and other countries in which Britain had extraterritorial rights. The reason for this was that as a leased territory, subject to rendition at any time, it was not considered appropriate to treat Weihaiwei as if it was a full colony.

In exchange for recognising British Weihaiwei, Germany demanded and received assurance from Britain through Arthur Balfour that Britain would recognise a German sphere in Shantung and not build a railway from Weihaiwei into the hinterland of Shantung province.

The nickname British sailors gave to this port was "Way High"; it was also referred to as Port Edward in English.

During British rule, residences, hospitals, churches, tea houses, sports grounds, post offices, and a naval cemetery were constructed.

=== Commissioners ===
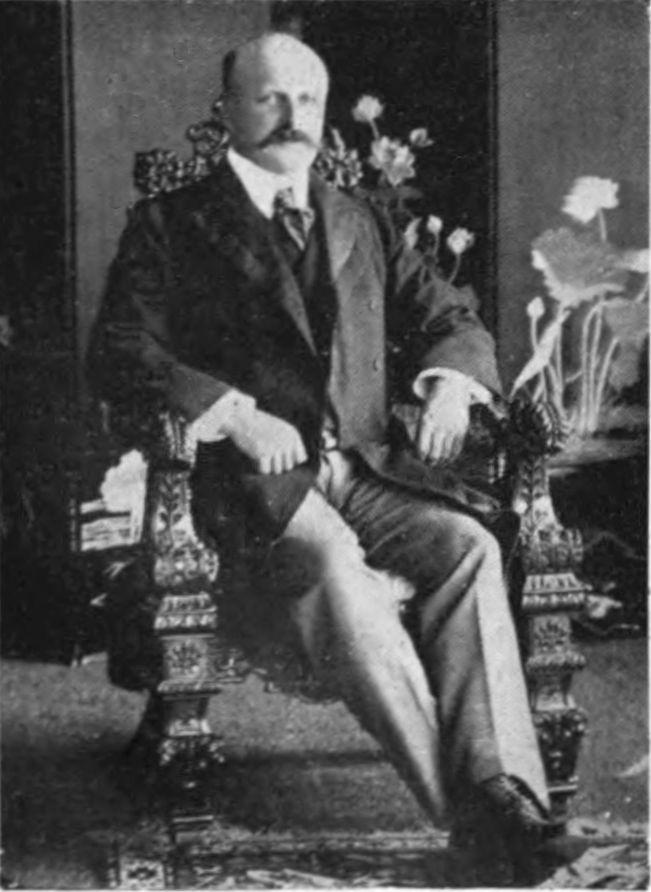
Sir James Stewart Lockhart, Commissioner of Weihaiwei, 1902–1921

Commissioner of Weihaiwei
- 威海衛專員
- Commissioner's flag (1903–1930)
- Colonial Office
- Seat: Port Edward
- Appointer: Monarch of the United Kingdom
- Term length: At His Majesty's Pleasure
- Formation: 1898
- First holder: Major-General Sir Arthur Robert Ford Dorward
- Final holder: Sir Reginald Johnston
- Abolished: 1930

The Commissioner of Weihaiwei (traditional Chinese: 威海衛專員; simplified Chinese: 威海卫专员; pinyin: Wēihǎiwèi Zhuānyuán) was the head of government for the British leased territory of Weihaiwei between 1898 and 1930. Until 1902, the first Commissioners of Weihaiwei were members of the British Army before civilians were appointed to the role. A Civil Commissioner was appointed in February 1902 to administer the territory. The post was held by Sir James Stewart Lockhart until 1921, where he oversaw the renaming of the civil seat of the Commissioner from Matou (lit. "wharf" or "port") to Port Edward and started to develop the territory as a holiday resort for British expatriates.

As the position was not a full Governorship, it afforded the holders more authority as they did not have to consult any territorial legislative or executive councils when making decisions or passing ordinances. The Commissioner of Weihaiwei was also responsible for representing the territory overseas.

After Lockhart, Arthur Powlett Blunt (1921–1923) and Walter Russell Brown (1923–1927) were appointed Commissioners in Weihaiwei. The last Commissioner was the sinologist Sir Reginald Fleming Johnston (previously tutor to the last Chinese emperor, Pu Yi) who served from 1927 to 1930.

==== Commissioner's flag ====
The Commissioners of Weihaiwei initially used a Union Jack with a Chinese imperial dragon from the flag of the Qing dynasty as their flag. When Lockhart arrived as the first civil commissioner, he wrote to the Colonial Office requesting that the dragon be replaced by Mandarin ducks as he felt it was inappropriate to use a Chinese national symbol on a British flag. King Edward VII approved the new design as well as the creation of a civil flag of Weihaiwei in 1903.

==== List of commissioners ====
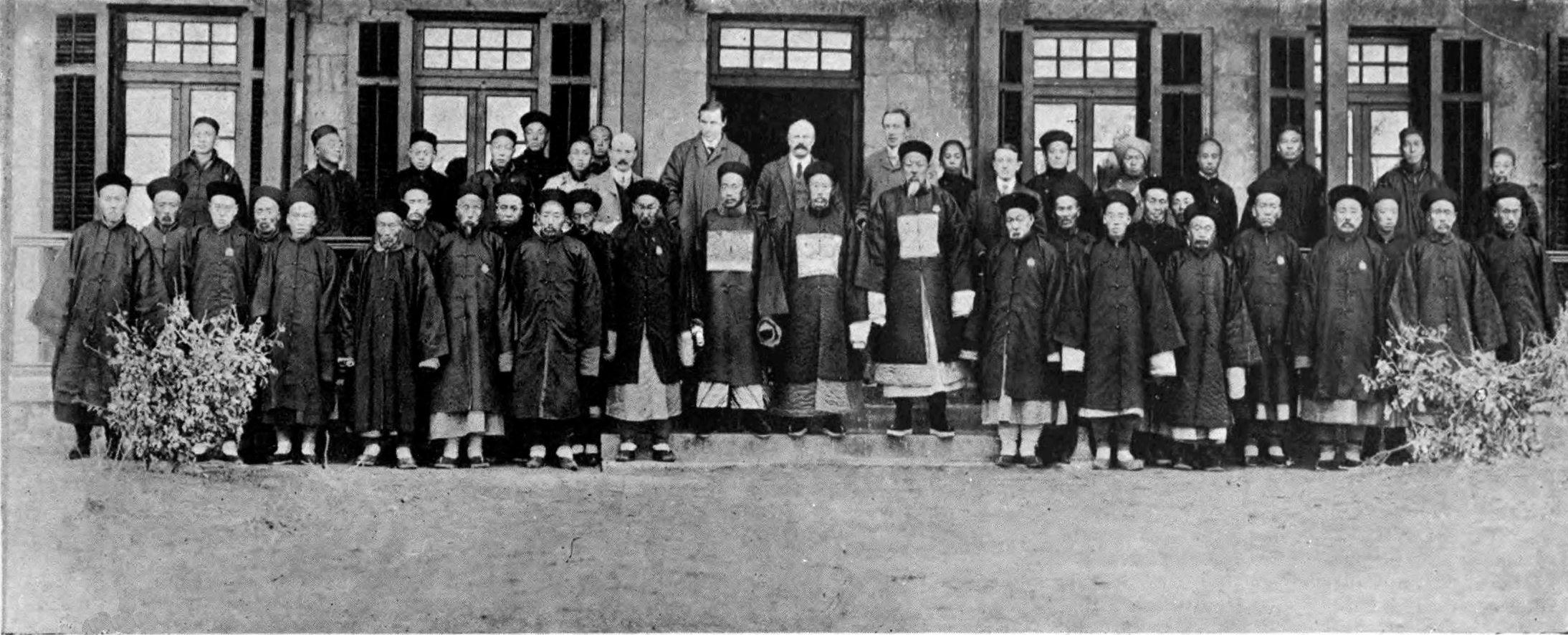
Commissioner staff and headmen of the territory in 1908

Below is a list of the military and civilian commissioners of Weihaiwei.

- 1898–1901 Major-General Sir Arthur Robert Ford Dorward
- 1901–1902 Commander John Dodson Daintree
- 1902–1921 Sir James Stewart Lockhart
- 1921–1923 Captain Arthur Powlett Blunt (acting)
- 1923–1927 Walter Russell Brown
- 1927–1930 Sir Reginald Johnston

== Postage stamps and currency ==
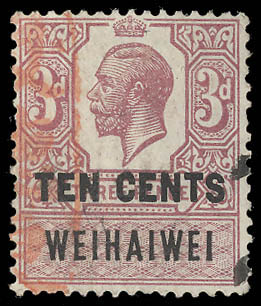
One of the revenue stamps of Weihaiwei issued in 1921

No special postage stamps were ever issued for Weihaiwei. Just as in other treaty ports, Hong Kong stamps were used. From 1917, these were overprinted with the word "CHINA". Revenue stamps of Weihaiwei were issued from 1921. There were never any special coins or banknotes issued for circulation in Weihaiwei. The various currencies in circulation in China at the time were used; the Hong Kong dollar was also used.

The following Chinese banknote issuers issued banknotes for circulation in Weihaiwei under British administration;

The Bank of Communications – from 1914 to 1927.

The Bank of China – in 1918.

The National Industrial Bank of China – in 1924.

These all have WEIHAIWEI overprinted in black on them.

== Army and police ==
The Weihaiwei Regiment was formed in 1898 with Lieutenant-Colonel Hamilton Bower as its first commanding officer and served in the Boxer Rebellion. The regiment was ordered to be totally disbanded in 1906 by Army Order No. 127 of 1906.

Some of the soldiers were retained as a permanent police force with three British Colour Sergeants commissioned as police inspectors. In 1910 the police force comprised three European Inspectors and 55 Chinese Constables. Previously, the force had comprised one Chinese sergeant and seven constables under a District Officer.

During World War I, the British recruited the Chinese Labour Corps in Weihaiwei to assist the war effort.

During the seamen's strike of 1922 in Hong Kong, the colonial government sent two European police officers to Weihaiwei in September of that year to recruit the first of about 50 Weihaiwei men as Royal Hong Kong Police constables. After completing six months' training in Weihaiwei, the recruits were posted to Hong Kong to maintain law and order in March 1923. The Weihaiwei policemen were known as the D Contingent in the HKP, and their service numbers were pre-fixed with letter "D" to differentiate them from the European "A", Indian "B" and Cantonese "C".

At the end of 1927, the Weihaiwei policemen in Hong Kong were replaced by Indians.

== High Court ==
In 1903, the British established a High Court of Weihaiwei. The judges of the court were chosen from individuals serving as a judge or Crown Advocate of the British Supreme Court for China in Shanghai. The three judges of the court from 1903 to 1930 were:

- Frederick Samuel Augustus Bourne (1903–1916), Assistant Judge of HBM Supreme Court for China
- Hiram Parkes Wilkinson (1916–1925), Crown Advocate of HBM Supreme Court for China
- Peter Grain (1925–1930), Assistant Judge, and from 1927, Judge of HBM Supreme Court for China

The Commissioner could also exercise judicial powers if the judges of the court were not available.

Appeals from the High Court for Weihaiwei could be made to the Hong Kong Supreme Court, then finally in the Judicial Committee of the Privy Council. It appears that no appeal was ever heard in Hong Kong.

Initially, the Crown Advocate for China, Hiram Parkes Wilkinson served as the Crown Advocate for Weihaiwei. When Wilkinson was appointed judge in 1916, Allan Mossop took over as Crown Advocate for Weihaiwei. Mossop later became Crown Advocate for China in 1926.

== Return of Weihaiwei ==
Weihaiwei was returned to Chinese rule on 1 October 1930 under the aegis of the final Commissioner of Weihaiwei Sir Reginald Johnston who previously had been a District Officer and a Magistrate in Weihaiwei. The last Commissioner of Weihaiwei flew the flag of the Republic of China alongside the Union Jack during the transitional day. Following the return of Weihaiwei to China, the Chinese replaced the British Commissioner role with their own version of the Commissioner as Weihaiwei became a Special Administrative Region of China; later, the Monument to the Recovery of Weihaiwei was created. However, the Chinese government leased the island of Liu-kung Tao (Liugong Island) to the Royal Navy for ten years; effective control came to an end following a Japanese military landing on 1 October 1940.

== See also ==
- China–United Kingdom relations
- British Empire
- British Chinese
- Chinese Labour Corps – coolies were recruited from Weihaiwei during World War I
- British Hong Kong
- Portuguese Macau
- Guangzhouwan (1898–1945), French leased territory in China administered as part of Indochina
