= James Stewart Lockhart =

British colonial official (1858-1937)

Sir James Stewart Lockhart
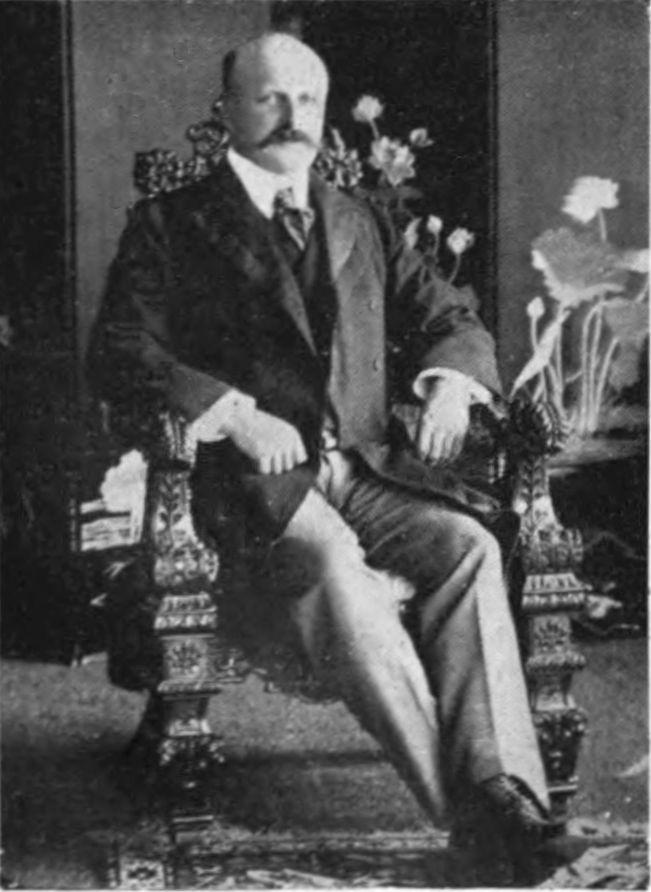

Registrar-General of Hong Kong
- In office 1887–1901
- Preceded by: Frederick Stewart
- Succeeded by: Arthur Winbolt Brewin

Colonial Secretary of Hong Kong
- In office 1895–1902
- Preceded by: George O'Brien
- Succeeded by: Francis Henry May

Commissioner of Weihaiwei
- In office 1902–1921
- Preceded by: John Dodson Daintree
- Succeeded by: Arthur Powlett Blunt

Personal details
- Born: 25 May 1858 Ardsheal, Argyllshire, Scotland
- Died: 26 February 1937 (aged 78) London, England
- Profession: Civil administrator, Sinologist

Sir James Haldane Stewart Lockhart, (Note: Born James Haldane Lockhart, he added the name of his mother's family, Stewart of Lorne, as a double surname when he married in 1889. His preferred name was James Stewart Lockhart for most of his working life.) KCMG (25 May 1858 – 26 February 1937) was a British colonial official in Hong Kong and China for more than 40 years. He also served as Commissioner of British Weihaiwei from 1902 to 1921. Additionally, he was a Sinologist who made pioneering translations.

== Early life ==
Born as James Haldane Lockhart in Ardsheal, Argyllshire, Scotland, his parents were Anna Rebecca Charlotte (Stewart) and Miles Lockhart of Lismore, Argyll. His grandfather was banker James Lockhart. He attended King William's College (1868–72), George Watson's College, and the University of Edinburgh, and attempted to enter the civil service in India. Failing to do that, Lockhart took a Colonial Service cadetship in Hong Kong in 1878.

== Colonial service in Hong Kong ==
After joining the Hong Kong Government in 1882, Lockhart rose through the ranks of Hong Kong's civil service. He was Registrar General and Colonial Secretary of Hong Kong, and later became Commissioner of Weihaiwei (1902–1927), the British coastal enclave returned to China in 1930. He had a more positive relationship with Hong Kong Chinese due to this knowledge of Cantonese and was friends with Ho Kai. Lockhart was made a member of the Hong Kong Legislative and Executive Councils.

Lockhart drafted the first English-language report on the New Territories after London's acquisition in 1898. He argued that the prevalent Chinese communal culture and organization would serve as a stabilizing force in the colony. Lockhart's preference for indirect and indigenized rule was a main factor leading to the official recognition of Chinese community organizations like Tung Wah Hospital and Po Leung Kuk.

He founded the Hong Kong Football Club in 1886, situated within the Happy Valley Racecourse. The club now plays host to the Hong Kong 10s rugby tournament.

In his many years in Hong Kong he became a sinophile and a convinced Confucianist. His resulting contention that only a hard-line Chinese-style Confucian administration would be understood or respected, and his hard-line response to local resistance in the 1899 takeover of the new territories, has been proposed as one of the main causes of the Six-Day War that lead to the deaths of over 500 punti clansmen.

== Sinological service ==
While they were both training in Hong Kong, Lockhart became friends with Reginald Johnston, who made his reputation while serving in Weihaiwei. Both men devoted great energy to their studies of Chinese language and classical literature, and both published scholarly works. Johnston was also a great emotional support to Lockhart and his family.

Johnston later wrote that, as Lockhart had had a sound training in Greek and Latin at Edinburgh University, he took easily to the study of Chinese, another classical language. The China Review, a journal for scholarly work by China coast foreigners, published Lockhart's early work, which mainly concerned linguistic questions. Lockhart was fluent in Cantonese, Johnston reported, and acquired a working knowledge of Mandarin when he was posted to Weihaiwei.

== Numismatics and art collecting ==
Lockhart was particularly interested in collecting and studying Chinese coins, and he produced several publications on numismatics. He also made a thorough study of Chinese art and literature, and formed a large collection of paintings, ink rubbings and decorative arts, some of which was displayed in 1928.

The collection was donated by his daughter, Betty Joel, to his alma mater, George Watson's College, and is currently on a long-term loan to the National Museum of Scotland. Lockhart's Chinese books were purchased by Cambridge University Library; his photographs are on loan to the Scottish National Portrait Gallery.

== Later life ==
After retiring from the Colonial Service, Lockhart returned to Britain. He became an honorary member of the Royal Asiatic Society and member of the School of Oriental Studies at the University of London.

== Honours and legacy ==
His appointment of CMG was signed by Queen Victoria on 21 May 1898, while his appointment of KCMG was signed by King Edward VII on 9 November 1908. He received an honorary LLD degree from the University of Hong Kong in 1918.

Lockhart Road in Wan Chai, Hong Kong Island, is named after him.

== Family ==
In 1889, Lockhart married Edith Louise Rider Hancock. They had one son and two daughters: Charles, Mary (known by her married and professional name Betty Joel), and Margaret. He returned with his family to England in 1927 and died in London in 1937.

== Notes ==
Footnotes

Citations

== Selected publications ==
- Lockhart, James H. Stewart (1893). A Manual of Chinese Quotations, Being a Translation of the Ch'êng Yü K'ao. Hong Kong: Kelly & Walsh.
- Lockhart, James H. Stewart (1915). The Stewart Lockhart Collection of Chinese Copper Coins. Shanghai etc.: Kelly & Walsh, limited.
- Fraser, Everard Duncan Home, Ming Tso-ch*°u and James H. Stewart Lockhart (1930). Index to the Tso Chuan. London, New York: Oxford university press H. Milford.
- Lockhart, James H. Stewart (1975). The Lockhart Collection of Chinese Copper Coins. Lawrence, Mass.: Quarterman Publications. ISBN 0880000562.
- White, R. Byron, James H. Stewart Lockhart and Marjorie White (1976). A Comprehensive Finding List of Chinese Cash: T'ang to Republic K'ai Yuan to Min Kuo, 618 Ad to 1912 Ad, Together with Lockhart's Listing of the Chinese Dynasties. Sheldonville, MA: White. ISBN 0917114019.

Government offices
Preceded by Frederick Stewart	Registrar-General of Hong Kong; 1887–1901	Succeeded by Arthur Winbolt Brewin
Preceded by George Thomas Michael O'Brien	Colonial Secretary of Hong Kong; 1895–1902	Succeeded by Sir Francis Henry May
Preceded by John Dodson Daintree	Commissioner of Weihaiwei; 1902–1921	Succeeded by Arthur Powlett Blunt
Political offices
Preceded by Samuel Brown	President of the Sanitary Board; 1891–1895	Succeeded by Francis Alfred Cooper
