= Henry Cushier Raven =

American naturalist and explorer

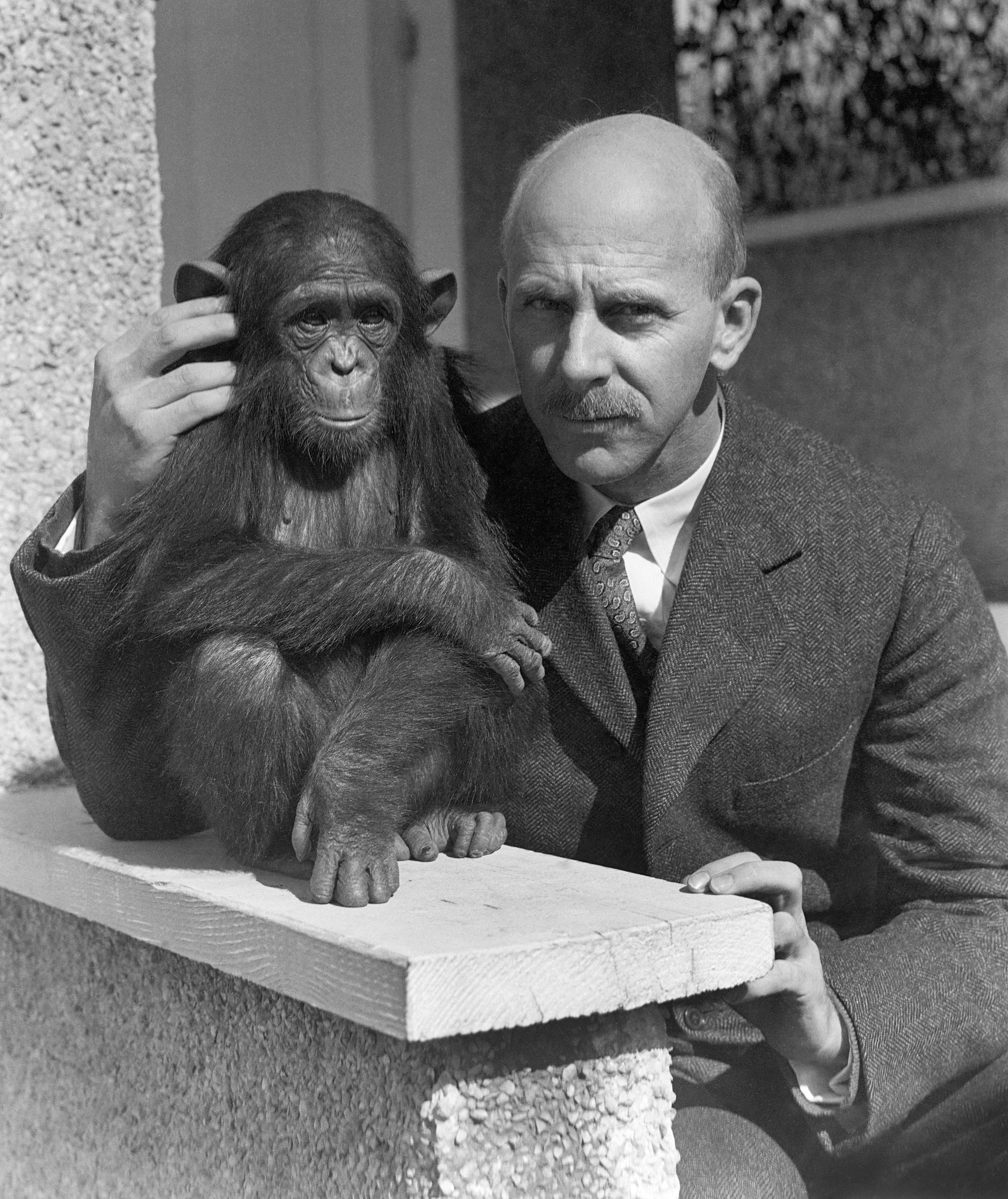
- Henry C. Raven and Meshie, his adopted chimpanzee, at the Baldwin, Long Island home where Meshie was raised with Raven's own children.
- Born: April 16, 1889; Brooklyn, New York
- Died: April 5, 1944 (aged 54); Sebring, Florida
- Spouse: Yvonne Aurousseau (m. 1923)
- Children: 4
- Scientific career
- Fields: Scientific Collector, Anatomist, Naturalist
- Workplaces: American Museum of Natural History, Smithsonian Institution

Henry Cushier Raven, better known as Harry Raven, (April 16, 1889 – April 5, 1944) was an American naturalist-explorer, scientific collector, mammologist, and anatomist at the American Museum of Natural History (AMNH) in New York. Raven crossed Africa from South to North and from East to West, traveled to previously unexplored Indonesian lands, and collected rare specimens from Australia and Greenland. His contribution to the natural history collections of several museums had a significant impact on the field of zoology. Raven also authored numerous publications and was the first to establish the complete anatomy of the gorilla from specimens that he had collected and preserved.

== Early life ==
Henry Cushier Raven was born in Brooklyn, New York on April 16, 1889, to Henry Stephenson Raven, a Long Island banker, and Mary Alberti Sims. He spent his boyhood and adolescence in Bay Shore, Long Island. Aboard the family's boats, he explored the Great South Bay and its islands, particularly Fire Island, with his father and his three brothers. During these excursions, he developed a strong and lasting passion for nature and animal anatomy, and a deep fondness for the outdoors. He was a skilled sailor, avid birdwatcher, specimen collector, taxidermist trainee, and veterinary surgeon assistant. When he was eleven years old, Raven saved five people from drowning at Elda Lake in North Babylon, New York in February 1901.

== Career ==
After graduating from Bay Shore High School, Raven moved to New York in 1907. Although he had no higher education, he was hired at the American Museum of Natural History in the Department of Preparation and Exhibition. After making casts of archaeological remains, he was tasked with collecting birds from Long Island and carrying out taxidermy work. He resigned in May 1911 to join the Colorado Museum of Natural History in Denver where he was charged with specimen collection in the surrounding region.

=== Scientific career ===
The Smithsonian Institution (Washington D.C.) hired Raven in November 1912 as a specimen collector, as well as to take over the position of expedition leader in the Dutch East Indies from American physician and naturalist William Louis Abbott. Following successful Smithsonian expeditions, he became a student at Cornell University (1918–1919) while curating the university's Zoological Museum. In July 1919, Raven left for Africa as a special collector and co-led The Cape-to-Cairo Expedition for the Smithsonian, and The American Commission to Negotiate Peace. After his return in 1920, he resumed his education at Columbia University in New York. He graduated with a degree in Vertebrate Zoology and joined the New York Zoological Society in 1921. He was rehired by the American Museum of Natural History and worked in the Department of Comparative Anatomy as the student and assistant of William King Gregory, recently appointed Curator of the department.

In 1921, Raven left on an expedition to collect specimens for the Australian Hall, notably kangaroos, Tasmanian devils, echidnas, and platypuss. Raven returned to New York in 1923. He wrote a series of papers on the marsupials and tried to further investigate the question of the Wallace Line. From June to October 1926, Raven went on an expedition to collect specimens in Greenland with publisher George Putnam (future husband of the famous American aviation pioneer Amelia Earhart) and his son David. He was then mainly interested in the narwhal and its anatomy, later publishing several articles on cetaceans. That year, he was promoted to Associate Curator of the Department of Comparative Anatomy, and appointed assistant in vertebrate paleontology at Columbia University. On May 29, 1929, Raven and Gregory left with Pr. J. H. McGregor and Dr. Earl T. Engle for The Columbia University and The American Museum of Natural History Expedition to Africa. They received permission from the King of Belgium, Albert I, to kill two gorillas. Crossing the continent from East to West, Raven collected comparative anatomical material, and secured gorilla specimens in the Belgian Congo and French Cameroon.

=== Raven and his chimpanzee ===
At the end of his second African trip, Raven was seriously ill with sleeping sickness and had to rest in his camp near Djaposten. There, he adopted a young female chimpanzee named Meshie Mungkunt whose mother had been recently killed. He became so attached to her that he brought Meshie back to the United States in February 1931, and introduced her to his family. Meshie lived in Baldwin, Long Island, for four years. During that time, Raven and his chimpanzee became the stars of the American Museum. Films, photographs, conferences, and popular articles showed Meshie living as a member of the household, eating with the family in the dining room, and sleeping with the children in their parents' bed. In reality, Meshie grew increasingly difficult to "control", and spent most of her time in a cage located in the basement. In December 1934, Raven was sent on a mission to Burma, and had to place Meshie at the Brookfield Zoo in Chicago. Meshie died from childbirth-related complications in August 1937. Her remains were sent to the American Museum in New York. She is now in the Primate Hall of the museum as the taxidermied specimen of the common chimpanzee or Pan troglodytes.

=== Last expeditions ===
In December 1934, Raven joined The Vernay-Hopwood Chindwin Expedition to Burma (now Myanmar) as the lead scientist, filmmaker, photographer, and specimen collector for the AMNH. He returned from Burma in the summer of 1935. About 1000 mammals and 750 birds were collected, as well as a large number of fish and reptiles. From 1938 to 1939, he went back on a mission for The Michael Lerner New Zealand and Australian Expedition, still for the American Museum. His last expeditions were short trips to Peru and Ecuador with Michael Lerner in 1941. During the three years before his death, Raven devoted himself to anatomical studies, the writing of articles (mainly about kangaroos and several species of cetacean), and the complete anatomical study of the gorilla. The latter resulted in a posthumous publication, The Anatomy of the Gorilla (1950). Having contracted sleeping sickness, malaria, and hookworm during his first expedition, Raven saw his health deteriorate during these same years. Appointed curator of the Department of Comparative Anatomy of the American Museum of Natural History in January 1944, Henry Cushier Raven died in Sebring, Florida on May 5, 1944.

=== Academia ===
Raven conducted a large number of anatomical studies and published numerous scientific papers over the first half of the twentieth century. He also published articles for the general public, notably in the American Museum popular science magazine Natural History, and a travel book, In Quest of Gorillas (1937), about his expedition to Africa with William King Gregory from 1929 to 1931. Raven also taught and lectured at various universities including New York University, Johns Hopkins College of Medicine, and Columbia University's department of Zoology (where he was Dr. Gregory's faculty assistant). In addition, Raven was a close friend of James Chapin, one of the highest-regarded ornithologists of the twentieth century. He also associated with many well-known figures, mainly through the American Museum of Natural History, including Roy Chapman Andrews, Herbert Lang, Carl and Mary Jobe Akeley, Martin and Osa Johnson.

== Personal life ==
Henry C. Raven met his future wife, Yvonne Aurousseau, during his first expedition in Australia (1921–1923). Their wedding was held in Sydney in March 1923. The couple had four children: Jane, born in 1924, Henry (1927), Mary (1933) and James (1936).
