= Arthur Dorward (British Army officer) =

British Army general

Major-General Sir Arthur Dorward KCB DSO
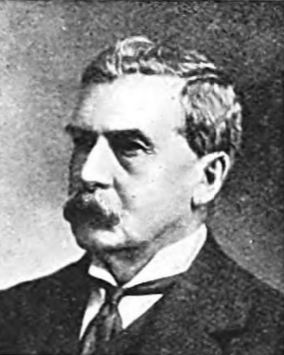
- Born: Arthur Robert Ford Dorward; 13 July 1848; Ootacamund, Madras Presidency
- Died: 25 March 1934 (aged 85); Palma, Majorca
- Military career
- Allegiance: United Kingdom
- Branch: British Army
- Service years: 1868–1918
- Rank: Major-General
- Commands: Troops in the Straits Settlements; Commissioner of Weihaiwei
- Conflicts: Second Anglo-Afghan War; Boxer Rebellion
- Awards: Knight Commander of the Order of the Bath; Distinguished Service Order

Major-General Sir Arthur Robert Ford Dorward, KCB, DSO (13 July 1848 – 25 March 1934) was a British Army officer who commanded the Troops in the Straits Settlements and served as the first Commissioner of British Weihaiwei.

== Early life and education ==
Dorward was born in Ootacamund, British India, the son of James Dorward of Pencaitland, Inspector-General of Hospitals, Madras, and his wife, Charlotte Matilda Ford. He was educated at Edinburgh High School and at Cheltenham College before attending the Royal Military College, Sandhurst.

== Military career ==
Dorward was commissioned into the Royal Engineers in 1868. He served in the Second Anglo-Afghan War in 1878. He was appointed Commander, Royal Engineers in Jamaica in 1897 and then took part in the capture of Tientsin following the Boxer Rebellion in China in 1900, for which he was knighted as a Knight Commander of the Order of the Bath (KCB). Dorward then served as Commissioner of Weihaiwei from September 1901, and went on to be Commander of the troops in Shanghai later the same year. In October 1902 it was announced he would vacate his command in Shanghai as the British reduced their forces in China, and he returned home where he was received by King Edward VII and invested with the KCB at Buckingham Palace on 24 October 1902.

Dorward was subsequently appointed General Officer Commanding the Troops in the Straits Settlements with the rank of brigadier-general on 13 November 1902, and left the UK for Singapore the same month, taking up the post on arrival in 1903. Two years later he was appointed Major-General in charge of Administration in South Africa in 1905. He retired from the army in July 1910, but served in the First World War as Inspector of Hutting at the War Office.

Dorward died in Palma, Majorca.
