= Liugong Island =

Island in Shandong, China

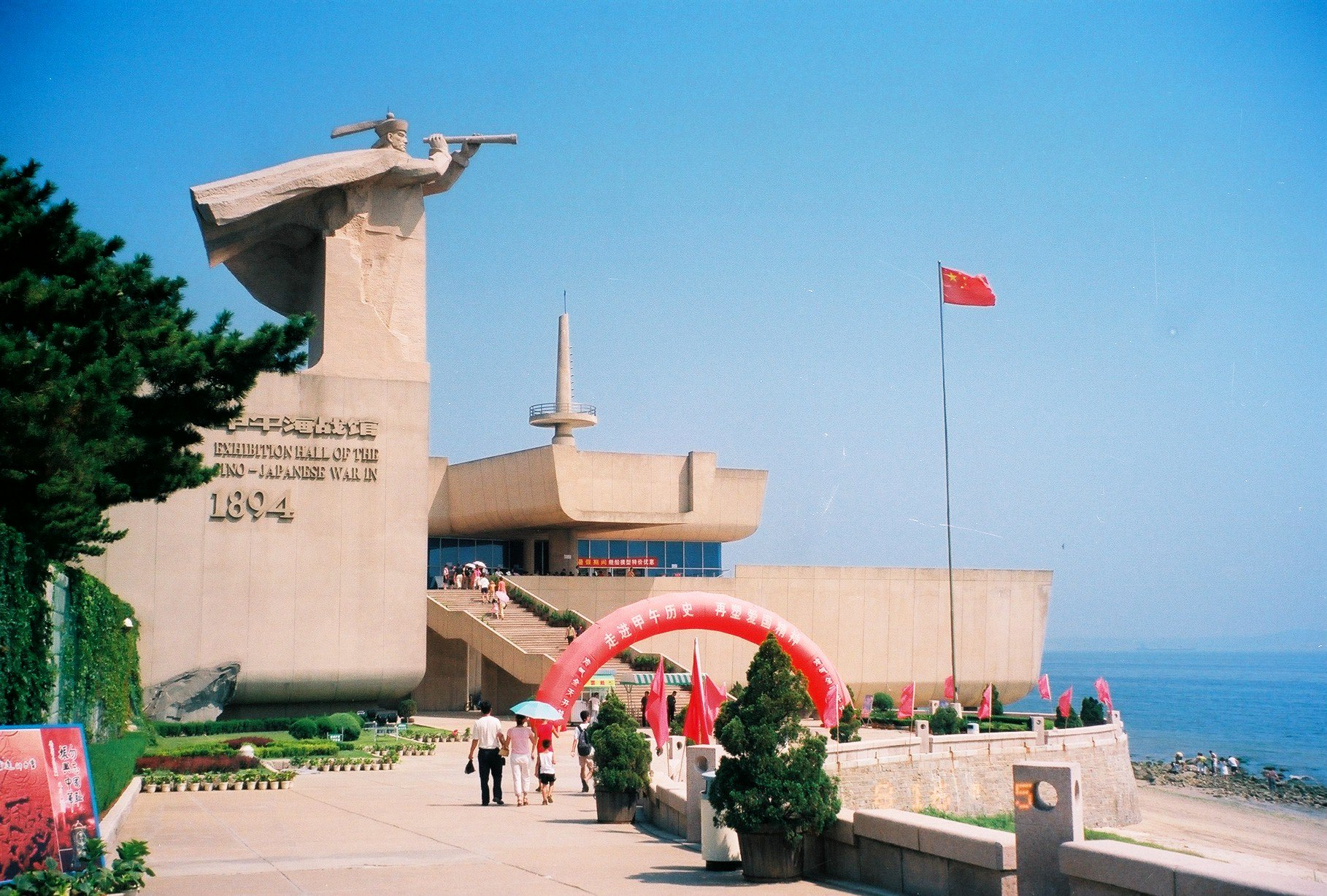
- War memorial hall
- Interactive map of Liugong Island

Geography
- Coordinates: 37°30′22″N 122°11′06″E
- Area: 3.15 km^{2} (1.22 sq mi)
- Length: 4.08 km (2.535 mi)
- Width: 1.5 km (0.93 mi)
- Coastline: 14.93 km (9.277 mi)
- Highest elevation: 153 m (502 ft)
- Highest point: Qiding Mountain

Administration
- China
- Province: Shandong
- City: Weihai
- District: Huancui

Liugong Island (simplified Chinese: 刘公岛; traditional Chinese: 劉公島; pinyin: Liúgōng Dǎo; Wade–Giles: Liu-kung Tao) is a small island located on the northeastern edge of Shandong Peninsula, China, at the mouth of Weihai Bay. It is known as the "birthplace of China's first modern navy" and is also the site of its defeat in the First Sino-Japanese War.

== Geography ==
Liugong Island is located about 4 kilometers (2 1/2 miles) from the city of Weihai. It has an area of 3.15 square kilometers (1 1/4 sq. mi.), with a maximum length of 4.08 kilometers (2 1/2 miles) (in east-western direction) and a maximum width of 1.5 kilometers (0.93 miles). The coastline has a total length of 14.93 kilometers (9 1/4 miles). In general, the terrain of the island slopes down from the north to the south. With an altitude of 153 meters (502'), Qiding Mountain, is the highest point of the island. Its northern slope is made up of cliffs, whereas the southern side of the hill slopes down more gently. Tourists can only arrive by boat.

More than half of the island's area (about 1.8 square kilometers; 440 acres) is covered by forest, predominantly consisting of black pine trees. The forest is protected by a national forestry park. On the island there is also a zoo, within which there are two pandas and a few other animals, of which some were gifts by the Taiwanese government to China.

Naval training grounds are also located on the island, along with a museum documenting the history of the First Sino-Japanese War, and a memorial to the Beiyang Fleet.

== History ==
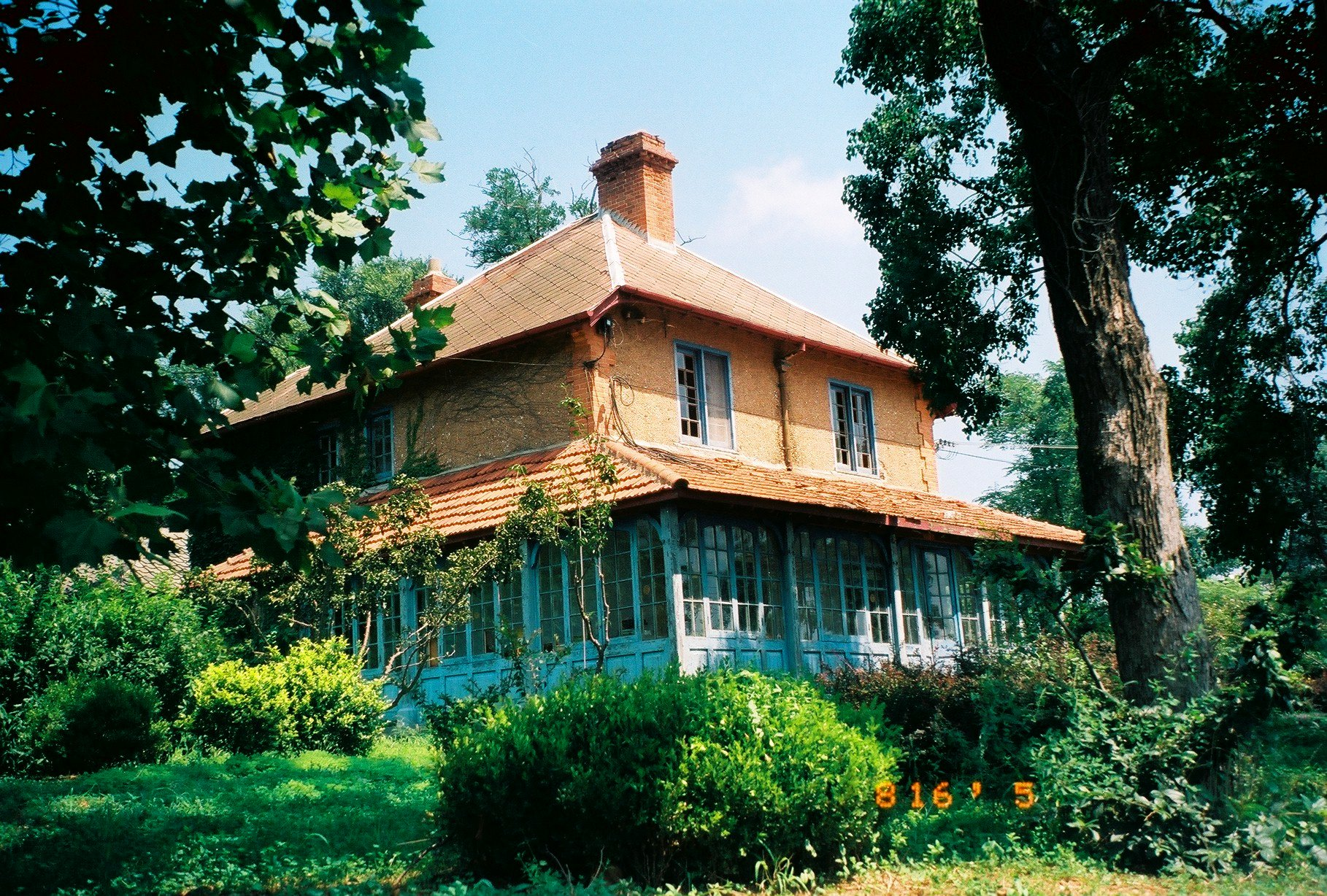
Former British residence

Archaeological evidence suggests that the island has been inhabited at least from the Warring States period onwards. During the times of the Han dynasty, the island was settled by members of the Liu family which resulted in the present-day name.

The use of the island was subject to several changes during the Ming dynasty: At first, all inhabitants left the island because of pirate threats. During the reign of the Jiajing Emperor, a rebel force led by Xian Wang sought refuge on the island, but the rebellion was put down shortly thereafter. Towards the end of the reign of the Wanli Emperor, settlers were recruited to re-cultivate the island. They were guarded against pirate attacks by a detachment of troops. Subsequently, a rise in shipping activities between the north and the south of China brought prosperity and an increase in population to the island.

In 1663, the island's population was evacuated yet again, this time in response to the outbreak of an epidemic. 27 years later, in 1690, the island was resettled by three families (Cong, Zou, and Jiang). In 1703, the island was chosen as the base for another rebel force, but again the rebellion was short-lived.

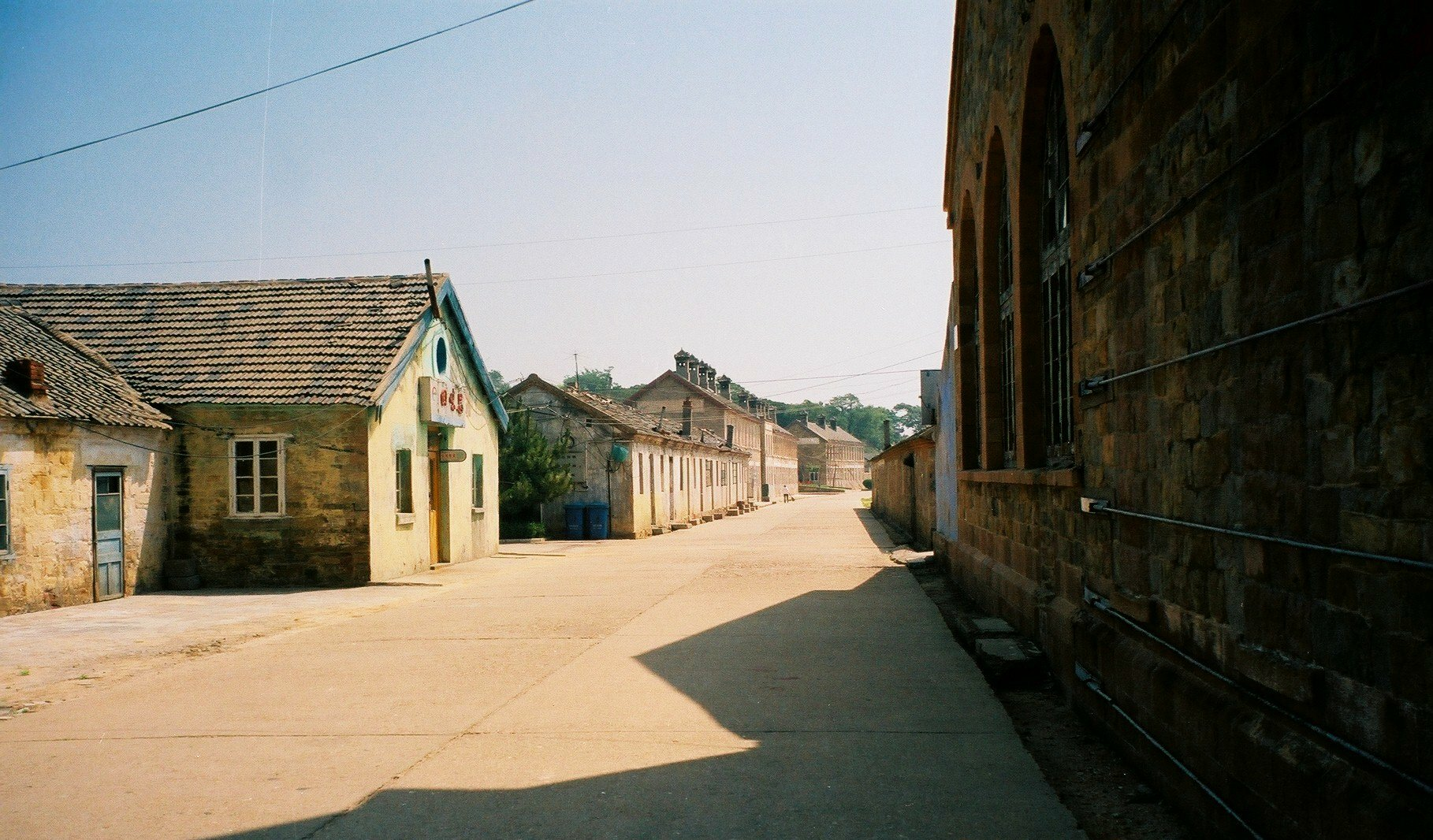
Historical navy facilities

During the reign of the Guangxu Emperor, the Beiyang Fleet was founded as China's first modern navy and a telegraph center, a naval academy, and the headquarters of the Beiyang Naval Units were set up on Liugong Island.

This resulted in the construction of many facilities and an increase in the island's population. Eight out of 15 modern warships which were bought from the United Kingdom and Germany were assigned to the Beiyang Fleet. On September 14, 1888, Admiral Ding Ruchang was given the command of the Beiyang Fleet. From 1887 onward, more than 100 cannons were set up around the harbour of Weihai as well as on the islands of Liugong and Ri. Eventually, Ding Ruchang made Liugong Island his official residence. A T-shaped dock, known as the "iron dock", was constructed in the years 1889 to 1891. During the First Sino-Japanese War, the Beiyang Fleet suffered a crushing defeat and in the spring of 1895, the island was occupied by Japanese forces.

Ding Ruchang committed suicide. The Japanese occupation lasted for about three years. In 1898, the United Kingdom bought the island (along with the rest of Weihaiwei) from the Japanese and agreed to hand it back to China after 25 years of use or when the Russians left nearby Port Arthur. Local Chinese were recruited into a British regiment but the island was not fortified. The Royal Navy established a base on Liugong Island occupying and extending the existing facilities. Residences, hospitals, churches, tea houses, a sport ground, a post office, and navy cemeteries were constructed as part of the British development of the area. When the Russians left Port Arthur in 1905, the terms of the lease meant Britain should return the island to China. England re-negotiated the lease with the Chinese to counter a new German presence in the area. Weihaiwei was returned to the Republic of China in 1930, after which it was a special administrative region. The Chinese government allowed the Royal Navy to continue to use the naval base for another ten years under a lease. Japan invaded Weihaiwei in 1938, so after that, there was a withdrawal of most British forces and supplies from Liugong, and finally a Japanese military landing and occupation of the island on 1 October 1940 (a day after Japan considered the lease expired, although Britain did not agree that their rights had lapsed as a new lease had been negotiated).

In 1949, the island was occupied by the People's Liberation Army.

== See also ==
- Ding Ruchang, memorial house on the island
