= Battle of Changhsing =

Battle during the Japanese invasion of Taiwan

- Part of Japanese Invasion of Taiwan (1895)
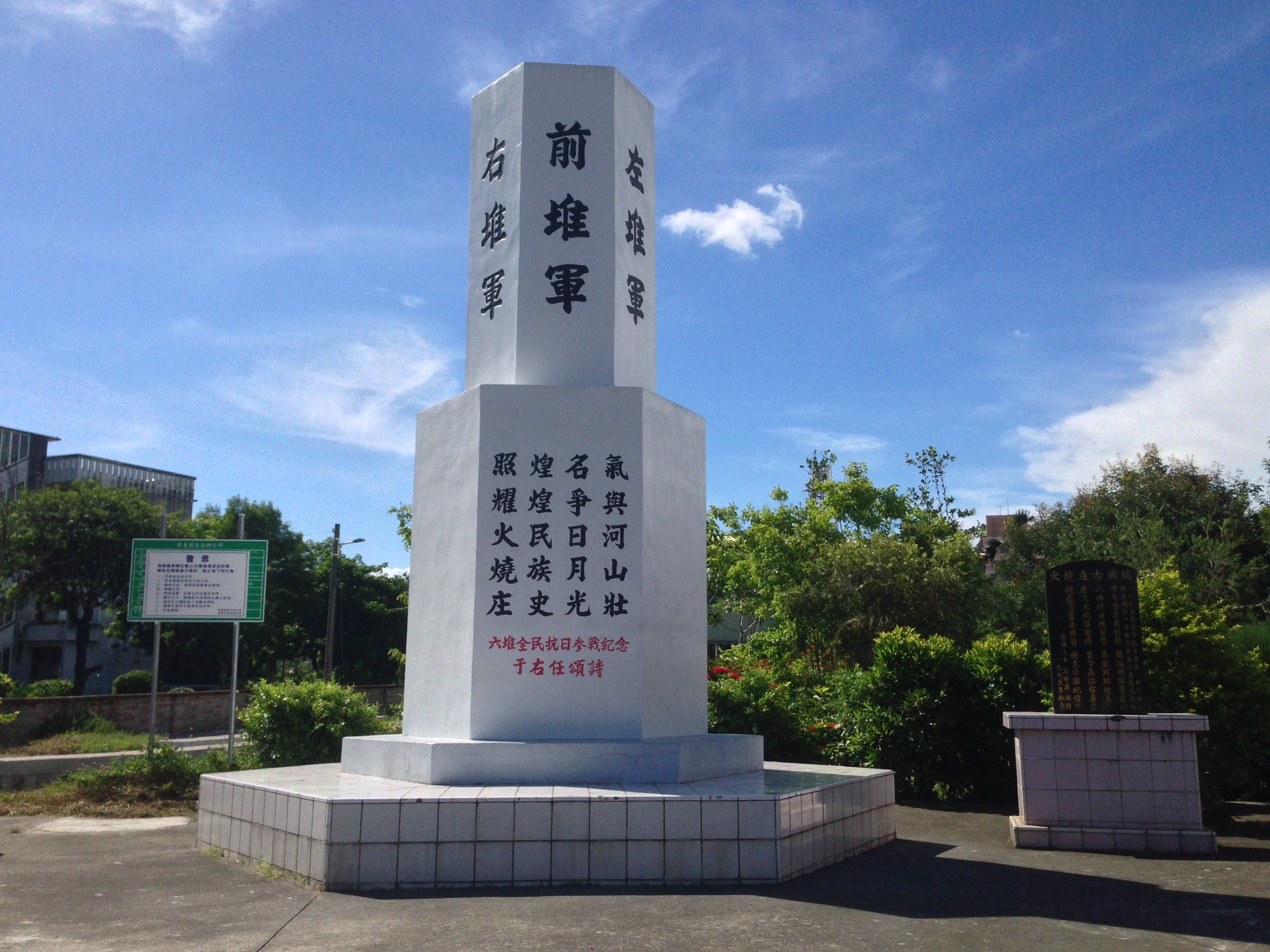
- Monument for battle of Changhsing
Date	26 November 1895
Location	Pingtung, Taiwan
Result	Japanese victory

Belligerents
Empire of Japan	Hakka militias remnants

Commanders and leaders
Major-General Yamaguchi Motoomi	Chiu Feng-yang

Strength
2,000	200~300

Casualties and losses
15 killed 57 wounded	100+ killed

The Battle of Changhsing (26 November 1895), popularly known in Taiwan as the Battle of the Burning Village was the last set-piece battle during the Japanese invasion of Taiwan. It was fought by Hakka militia and armed civilians against the invading Imperial Japanese Army in Changhsing village (長興村). The battle earned its name from the fact that the entire village was burnt to the ground by the Japanese during their attempts to capture it from the Formosans.

== Background ==
After the signing of the Treaty of Shimonoseki and the establishment of the Republic of Formosa, Chiu Feng-yang, a Hakka leader from Pingtung, called upon his supporters to form the so-called Liutui Hakka militias. The militias were organized into six units, according to the villages where they were recruited, hence the name Liutui (Chinese: 六堆; lit. 'six stacks'). The militias first engaged the Japanese at Chiatung, and were defeated due to their poor training and weaponry.

By the time the militia regrouped further to the south, the Republic of Formosa had collapsed in the wake of President Liu Yongfu's flight to mainland China on 20 October 1895 and the capitulation of Tainan to the Japanese on 21 October. Seeing no hope of matching the Japanese in a fight in the open around Tainan, Chiu ordered a retreat to Changhsing village, Pingtung, where he planned to make a last stand.

Chiu's forces fought alone against the Japanese. The Hakkas of the southern plains had long been at odds with the Pepohoans (the Indigenous Taiwanese who had originally owned the land on which Chinese immigrants had settled), and the Pepohoans stood aloof from the struggle. Indeed, they actively favoured the Japanese.

== Battle ==
Soon after their arrival, the militias fortified the village and brought in supplies. When the Japanese arrived, they found that a stone wall and other strong defensive positions had been built around Changhsing, and that almost the entire population of the village were armed, most of them with primitive weapons. The Japanese attempted to storm the village, but were pushed back several times by the Formosans.

Hakka villages in Taiwan at that time were often provided with elaborate fortifications, partly due to the perennial threat of raids by head-hunting Aborigines. A village might be surrounded by ditches and a wooden palisade, and perhaps also a wooden wall with towers and loopholes, which would be difficult to storm without artillery.

After hours of fierce fighting but little gain, the Japanese commander resorted to a massive bombardment to set fire to the village, and was successful in his attempt. The defenses were broken up and vicious hand-to-hand fighting ensued. In the end, more than half of the defenders, including their leader, were either killed or incapacitated, and the village was burnt to the ground by the fire. The Japanese suffered 15 killed and 57 wounded.

== Aftermath ==
The battle officially ended all formal resistance to the Japanese invasion, but sporadic insurgency continued for several more years, ending only when the Japanese Governor-General adopted a more flexible policy towards the local population. On the other hand, out of respect toward the defenders, the Japanese commander personally paid homage to the Formosan dead. In 1901, Governor-General Kodama Gentaro also paid homage at the Chung-Yi house, or the "House of the Loyal and Just Ones" (Chinese: 忠義亭), and ordered an annual commemoration to be held.

Several decades after the battle, Yu Youren, the then-chairman of Control Yuan of Republic of China, visited the site of the battle and wrote a poem praising the Formosan resistance:

Original Text	Romanization	Translation
氣與河山壯 名爭日月光 煌煌民族史 照耀火燒庄	chi-yu-he-shan-chuang min-cheng-ri-yue-kuang hui-huang-min-tsu-shih chao-yao-huo-shao-chuang	Imposing as the rivers and mountains Bright as the Sun and the Moon; The glorious history of our nation Shines on the Burning Village

A monument was dedicated in 1995 to the Formosans who fell in the battle.

== See also ==
- History of Taiwan

== Bibliography ==
- Davidson, J. W. (1903). The Island of Formosa, Past and Present. London.
- McAleavy, H. (1968). Black Flags in Vietnam: The Story of a Chinese Intervention. New York.
- Takekoshi, Yosaburo (1907). Japanese Rule in Formosa. London.
