= Mount Davidson =

Mount Davidson may refer to:

- Mount Davidson (Alberta)
- Mount Davidson (Antarctica)
- Mount Davidson (British Columbia)
- Mount Davidson (California), highest point of San Francisco.
- Mount Davidson (Nevada)

== See also ==
- Mount David (disambiguation)
