= Nashiba Tokioki =

Japanese politician

Baron Nashiba Tokioki
- 梨羽 時起
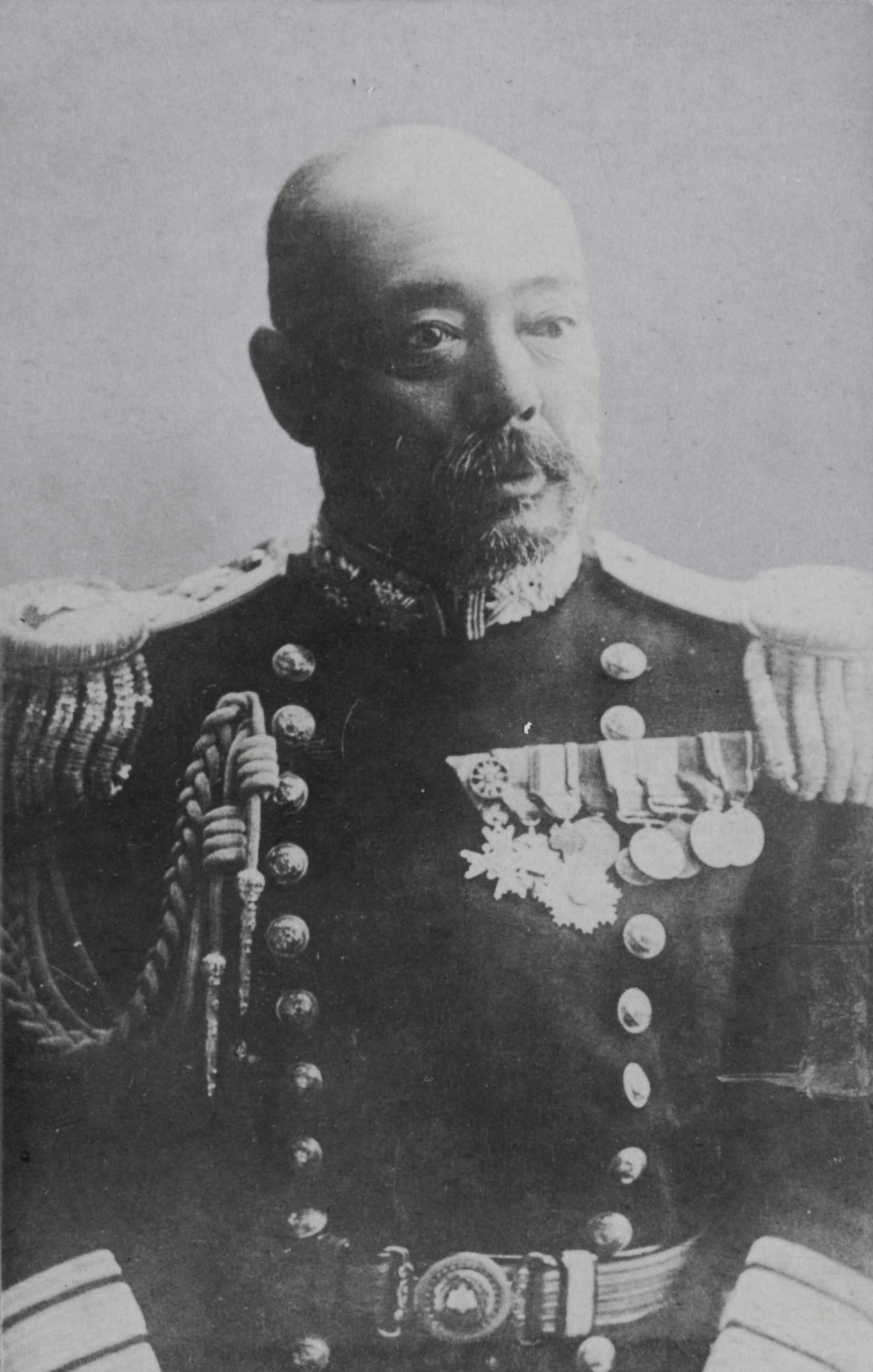
- Born: 24 September 1850; Chōshū Domain, Japan
- Died: 24 October 1924 (aged 74)
- Military career
- Allegiance: Empire of Japan
- Branch: Imperial Japanese Navy
- Service years: 1880–1907
- Rank: Vice Admiral
- Conflicts: Boshin War; First Sino-Japanese War; Russo-Japanese War

Member of the House of Peers
- In office 10 July 1911 – 9 July 1918 Elected by the Barons

Baron Nashiba Tokioki (梨羽 時起; 24 September 1850 – 24 October 1924) was an admiral in the early Imperial Japanese Navy, noted for his role in the battleship Yashima naval disaster of 1904.

== Biography ==
Nashiba was born in Chōshū Domain (now Yamaguchi Prefecture, as the 4th son to a 1000 koku samurai retainer. As a child, he was adopted into the Nashiba family, and took their name. His older brother was Admiral Arichi Shinanojo.

As a samurai youth, he fought as a battalion commander in the Boshin War to overthrow the Tokugawa shogunate. He then served in the new Meiji government in the Railway Ministry from 1871.

In August 1880, he joined the Imperial Japanese Navy, serving on frigate Fujisan and corvettes Tsukuba, Tenryū, Kongō, Katsuragi and Chiyoda. During the First Sino-Japanese War, he was on the gunboat Akagi followed by the corvette Amagi.

After the war, he served as commander of the torpedo school at Kure Naval District, following which he captained the Kaimon, Katsuragi, Kongō, Akitsushima, Hashidate, Chin'en, Takasago, Tokiwa and battleship Hatsuse. He was then promoted in July 1903 to rear admiral, commander in chief of the Kure Naval District and commander in chief of the Readiness Fleet.

With the Russo-Japanese War, Nashiba assumed command of the IJN 1st Fleet, which was responsible for blockading the Russian Pacific Fleet within Port Arthur. On 14 May 1904 he put to sea with the battleships Hatsuse (flag), Shikishima, and Yashima, cruiser Kasagi, and dispatch-vessel Tatsuta to relieve the Japanese blockading force off Port Arthur. On the morning of 15 May, the squadron proceeded to patrol to east by north across the mouth of the port. This course brought the Japanese fleet into a minefield previously laid by the Russian minelayer Amur. Both Hatsuse and Yashima struck naval mines and were lost in the greatest Japanese naval disasters during the Russo-Japanese War.

After the war, Nashiba served in a number of staff positions at Yokosuka Naval District and Sasebo Naval District, and was appointed commander of the Mako Guard District. He was promoted the vice admiral in March 1907, and retired from active service in October of the same year.

In September 1907, Nashiba was ennobled with the title of baron (danshaku) under the kazoku peerage system and served in the House of Peers from 1911 to 1918.

== Sources ==
- Dupuy, Trevor N. (1992). Encyclopedia of Military Biography. I B Tauris & Co Ltd. ISBN 1-85043-569-3.
- Schencking, J. Charles (2005). Making Waves: Politics, Propaganda, And The Emergence Of The Imperial Japanese Navy, 1868-1922. Stanford University Press. ISBN 0-8047-4977-9.
- Warner, Peggy (2005). The Tide at Sunrise:A History of the Russo-Japanese War 1904-1905. Routledge. ISBN 0-7146-8234-9.
