= Mount David =

Mount David may refer to:

- Mount David (Maine), a rocky summit in Lewiston, Maine, on the campus of Bates College
- Mount David (Washington), a mountain summit located in the U.S. state of Washington, in the Glacier Peak Wilderness, on land managed by the Okanogan-Wenatchee National Forest

== See also ==
- David Mount, American computer scientist professor at the University of Maryland, College Park department of computer science whose research is in computational geometry.
- Dave Mount (David George Mount), British rock drummer
- Mount Davidson (disambiguation)
