= Arichi Shinanojō =

Japanese admiral and politician

Baron Arichi Shinanojō
- 有地 品之允
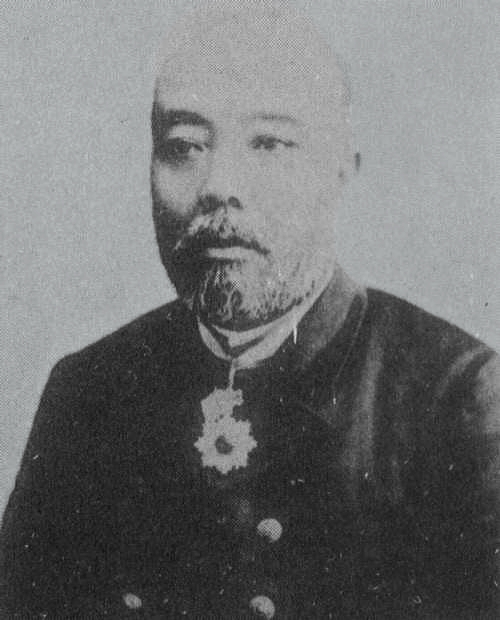
- Born: 15 March 1843; Hagi, Nagato, Japan
- Died: 17 January 1919 (aged 75); Shinjuku, Tokyo, Japan
- Military career
- Allegiance: Empire of Japan
- Branch: Imperial Japanese Army (1871–1873); Imperial Japanese Navy (1873–1911)
- Service years: 1871–1911
- Rank: Major (1871–1873); Vice Admiral (1892–1911)
- Commands: Chief of the Navy General Staff, Commander-in-Chief of the Combined Fleet, Readiness Fleet, Kure Naval District
- Conflicts: Boshin War; First Sino-Japanese War; Japanese Invasion of Taiwan (1895)

Member of the Privy Council
- In office 27 April 1917 – 17 January 1919
- Monarch: Taishō

Member of the House of Peers
- In office 10 July 1897 – 30 April 1917 Elected by the Barons

Baron Arichi Shinanojō (有地 品之允; 15 March 1843 – 17 January 1919) was an admiral in the early Imperial Japanese Navy, and served as Chief of the Imperial Japanese Navy General Staff in the late 19th century.

== Biography ==
Arichi was born in Chōshū Domain (now Yamaguchi Prefecture. His younger brother was Admiral Nashiba Tokioki. As a samurai youth, he fought in the Boshin War to overthrow the Tokugawa shogunate, participating in combat in the northern Tohoku campaign. He was then dispatched by the domain to Europe for studies, observing military operations in the Franco-Prussian War first-hand. On his return to Japan, he was commissioned as a major in the new Imperial Japanese Army in 1871. Under the new Meiji government, he served in the Ministry of War, and transferred to the fledgling Imperial Japanese Navy in 1873 with the rank of lieutenant commander. He was thus was of the few men from Chōshū Domain to choose the navy over the army as a career. It is not certain why he made this choice, but some historians theorize it was part of a strategy by the Chōshū clan leaders to ensure that the navy did not become a Satsuma monopoly.

Arichi was captain of the frigate Fujisan in 1878 and corvette Nisshin in 1881. After his promotion to the rank of captain in 1882, he was assigned as commanding officer of the corvette Hiei, followed by Tsukuba. In 1884, while captain of Tsukuba, the ship suffered from an outbreak of beriberi in which 23 crewmen died. Subsequently, Tsukuba was used as the basis of a successful experiment by naval doctor Takaki Kanehiro into the sailors' diet, which later eliminated beriberi as an issue within the Japanese navy.

Arichi was promoted to rear admiral on 15 June 1886 and became commandant of the Imperial Japanese Naval Academy from 1887 to 1889. He was Chief of the Imperial Japanese Navy General Staff from 1889 to 1891.

From 1891 to 1892, Arichi served as commander in chief of the Readiness Fleet. He was promoted to vice admiral in 1892. During the First Sino-Japanese War, he was initially commander in chief of Kure Naval District, and became commander in chief of the Combined Fleet from May to October 1895, overseeing in the Japanese invasion of Taiwan. During this campaign, the captain of the cruiser Yaeyama provoked a diplomatic incident with the United Kingdom when he stopped and boarded the British-flagged merchant ship SS Thales in international waters off of Amoy on the morning of 21 October 1895 in search of Liu Yongfu, the fugitive president of the Republic of Formosa. Due to the diplomatic protest over the violation of British neutrality, the Japanese government was forced to issue an official apology and forced Arichi into retirement.

On 5 June 1896, Arichi was ennobled with the title of baron (danshaku) under the kazoku peerage system.

Arichi served in the House of Peers from 1897 to 1917. He retired in 1911, but continued to serve as a member of the Privy Council from 1917 until his death in 1919. His grave is at Aoyama Cemetery in Tokyo.

Military offices
Preceded by Itō Toshiyoshi	Chief of the Imperial Japanese Navy General Staff; 17 May 1889 – 17 June 1891	Succeeded by Inoue Yoshika
Preceded by Nakamuta Kuranosuke	Commander-in-chief of Kure Naval District; 12 December 1892 - 12 May 1895	Succeeded by Abo Kiyoyasu
Preceded by Itō Sukeyuki	Combined Fleet; Commander-in-Chief; 11 May 1895 - 16 November 1895	Succeeded by Dissolved, next held by Tōgō Heihachirō
