= Battle of Chiayi =

- Part of Japanese invasion of Taiwan (1895)
Date	9 October 1895
Location	Chiayi, Taiwan
Result	Japanese victory

Belligerents
Empire of Japan	Qing regulars and Formosan militia

Commanders and leaders
Prince Kitashirakawa Yoshihisa	Li Weiyi

Strength
9,000 soldiers	~3,600 tribes

Casualties and losses
14 killed, 54 wounded	200+ dead

The Battle of Chiayi (9 October 1895; Chinese: 嘉義之役) was an important engagement fought during the Japanese invasion of Taiwan in 1895. The battle was a Japanese victory.

== Background ==
On 27 August 1895 the Japanese captured Changhua, after inflicting a crushing defeat on the Formosan insurgents at Baguashan. This action was followed by a lull in the campaign, during which the Japanese consolidated their positions and waited for the arrival of fresh troops from Japan. The only significant military action in central Formosa during the weeks following the capture of Chang-hua was a series of engagements in early September around Yunlin. On 3 September Formosan insurgents attacked the small Japanese garrison of the village of Toapona, to the south of Chang-hua. Japanese reinforcements came up, and the insurgents were defeated and retreated towards Yunlin. A Japanese infantry company in the vicinity attacked the retreating insurgents and during the evening of 3 September pursued them as far as the walled city of Talibu, whose defences it scouted. Three days later, during the night of 5 September, the Japanese returned and made a surprise night attack on Talibu. The Japanese vanguard scaled the city walls and opened the gates for its comrades, who poured into the city firing volleys. The Formosans fled in confusion, and by 5 a.m. on 6 September Talibu was securely occupied by the Japanese. Formosan losses during these few days of fighting amounted to 130 killed, while Japanese losses were only eight men killed and wounded.

Although the Formosans were unable to challenge the Japanese military ascendancy in central Formosa, continuing Formosan guerilla attacks kept the Japanese short of supplies. The island’s pestilential climate also continued to take its toll of the invaders. A severe outbreak of malaria at Chang-hua in early September 1895, worse even than the cholera outbreak on the Pescadores five months earlier, ravaged the Japanese forces, killing more than 2,000 men.

== Battle of Chiayi ==
In early October, on the arrival of reinforcements from Japan, the Japanese resumed their drive on the Republican capital Tainan. The Imperial Guards Division, under the command of Prince Kitashirakawa Yoshihisa, commenced its march south from Chang-hua on 3 October. On 6 October the division's advance guard defeated a force of 3,000 insurgents at Talibu. On 7 October the division fought an important action against a force of insurgents at Yunlin, driving them from a series of fortified positions. On 9 October the division fought the second-largest battle of the campaign after Baguashan, to storm the walled city of Chiayi, where the insurgents had decided to make a determined stand.

According to report, the Chinese and Formosans numbered 10,000 men and included both regular and volunteer units. The true figure was probably around 3,000 men, but the insurgents were stiffened by a force of 600 Black Flags, who now fought the Japanese for the first time during the campaign, and also deployed cannon and machine guns on the city walls. After a preliminary bombardment with their mountain artillery the Japanese scaled the walls and broke into the city. The insurgents were defeated, leaving over 200 dead on the field. Total casualties in the Imperial Guards Division in the engagements fought between 3 and 9 October were 14 killed and 54 wounded. The division was ordered to halt at Chiayi and wait until Prince Fushimi's northern expedition went ashore at Pa-te-chui before resuming its advance.
