= 1895 Japanese invasion of Taiwan =

Invasion of Taiwan by Imperial Japan

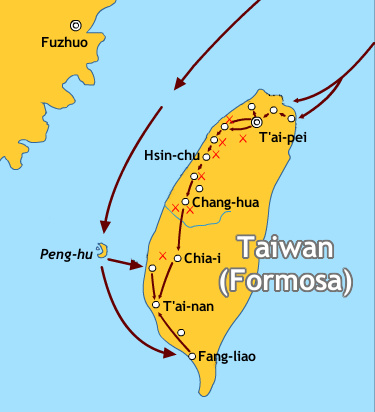
- Japanese operations in Taiwan, 1895
Date	29 May－18 November 1895 (5 months and 20 days)
Location	Taiwan and the Penghu Islands
Result	Japanese victory
Territorial changes	Collapse of the Republic of Formosa 5-month insurgency and annexation of Taiwan by Japan

Belligerents
Empire of Japan	Republic of Formosa

Commanders and leaders
(Empire of Japan) Kabayama Sukenori; (Empire of Japan) Arichi Shinanojo; (Empire of Japan) Nogi Maresuke; Prince Kitashirakawa Yoshihisa (WIA); Prince Fushimi Sadanaru; (Empire of Japan) Hishijima Yoshiteru	Tang Jingsong (surrendered); Liu Yongfu (surrendered)

Strength
7,000, rising to 37,000 by October 1895 around a dozen warships	75,000 (ex-Qing regulars, local volunteers and Hakka militia)

Casualties and losses
Killed: 333; Wounded: 687; Died from disease: 4,642	Killed: 14,000 including civilian casualties

The Japanese invasion of Taiwan, also known as Yiwei War in Chinese (Chinese: 乙未戰爭; 29 May–18 November 1895), was a conflict between the Empire of Japan and the armed forces of the short-lived Republic of Formosa following the Qing dynasty's cession of Taiwan to Japan in April 1895 at the end of the First Sino-Japanese War. The Japanese sought to take control of their new possession, while the Republican forces fought to resist Japanese occupation.

The Japanese landed near Keelung on the northern coast of Taiwan on 29 May 1895, and in a five-month campaign swept southwards to Tainan. Although their advance was slowed by guerrilla activity, the Japanese defeated the Formosan forces (a mixture of regular Chinese units and local Hakka militias) whenever they attempted to make a stand. The Japanese victory at Baguashan on 27 August, the largest battle ever fought on Taiwanese soil, doomed the Formosan resistance to an early defeat. The fall of Tainan on 21 October ended organised resistance to Japanese occupation and inaugurated five decades of Japanese rule in Taiwan.

== Early invasion ==
=== Japanese occupation of the Penghu Islands ===
In 1894, China and Japan went to war, and in a few months, the Japanese defeated China's Beiyang Fleet, routed the Chinese armies in Manchuria, and captured Port Arthur and Weihaiwei. Although nearly all the fighting took place in northern China, Japan had territorial ambitions in southern China. As the First Sino-Japanese War approached its end, the Japanese took steps to ensure that Taiwan would be ceded to Japan under the eventual peace treaty and that they were well placed militarily to occupy the island.

In March 1895, peace negotiations between Japan and China opened in the Japanese city of Shimonoseki. Although hostilities in northern China were suspended during these negotiations, Taiwan and the Penghu (Pescadores) Islands were specifically excluded from the scope of the armistice. Possession of the Penghu Islands, lying midway between mainland China and Taiwan, was the key to a successful occupation of Taiwan.

A rumour was widely circulated at this time that the Chinese authorities, realising they were powerless to prevent Taiwan and the Penghu Islands falling into the hands of Japan, had offered to cede them temporarily to Britain, presumably on the understanding that they would be returned at a later date. According to this rumour, the Chinese proposal was discussed by the British cabinet, and the British prime minister Lord Rosebery and the foreign secretary Lord Kimberley refused even to consider it. Apparently, the British cabinet's reluctance to accept the arrangement was based not, as has sometimes been suggested, on the fear that accepting Taiwan would immediately embroil Britain in a conflict with Japan, but rather on the calculation that if Taiwan became a British colony, even temporarily, a wholesale partition of China would have followed.

Although the Penghu Islands were garrisoned by 15 Chinese regular battalions (5,000 men) and defended by the recently-completed xidai coastal defence battery (built in the late 1880s in response to the capture of Penghu Islands by the French during the Sino-French War), the Japanese met very little resistance during the landing operation, as the defenders were demoralised: it took the Japanese only three days to secure the islands. After a naval bombardment of the Chinese forts, Japanese troops went ashore on Fisher Island (modern-day Xiyu) and Penghu Island on 24 March, fought several brief actions with defending Chinese troops, captured the key xidai battery, and occupied Magong. In the next two days, they occupied the other main islands of the Penghu Islands group. Japanese combat casualties were negligible, but a cholera outbreak shortly after the fall of the islands killed more than 1,500 men from the Japanese occupation force. The soldiers of the defeated Chinese garrison of the Penghu Islands, most of whom surrendered without a fight, were repatriated by the Japanese to mainland China.

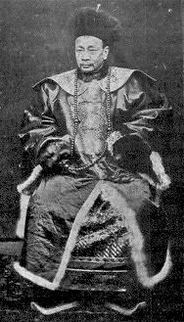
Tang Jingsong (1841–1903), president of the short-lived Republic of Formosa

=== Cession of Taiwan to Japan and proclamation of Republic of Formosa ===
The Japanese occupation of the Penghu Islands was of considerable strategic significance, preventing China from substantially reinforcing its garrisons in Taiwan. Having made it almost impossible for China to fight successfully for Taiwan, the Japanese pressed their claims to the island in the peace negotiations. The Treaty of Shimonoseki was signed on 17 April 1895 and contained a clause requiring the cession of Taiwan and the Penghu Islands. On 10 May, Admiral Kabayama Sukenori was appointed the first Japanese governor-general of Taiwan.

When the news of the treaty's contents reached Taiwan, a number of notables from central Taiwan led by Qiu Fengjia decided to resist the transfer of Taiwan to Japanese rule. On 23 May, these men proclaimed the establishment of a free and democratic Republic of Formosa in Taipei. Tang Jingsong, the Qing governor-general of Taiwan, was prevailed upon to become the republic's first President, and his old friend Liu Yongfu—the retired Black Flag Army commander, who had become a national hero in China for his victories against the French in northern Vietnam a decade earlier—was invited to serve as Grand General of the Army.

Qiu Fengjia was appointed Grand Commander of Militia, with the power to raise local militia units throughout the island to resist the Japanese. In mainland China, Zhang Zhidong, the influential Viceroy of Liangjiang, tacitly supported the Formosan resistance movement, and the Republicans also appointed Chen Jitong—a disgraced Chinese diplomat who understood European ways of thinking—as the Republic's foreign minister, whose job would be to sell the Republic abroad.

There was little or no popular support in Taiwan for the proclamation of the Republic, and many Western observers considered its establishment as a cynical ploy by its authors to evade China's obligations under the Treaty of Shimonoseki. Acting under the authority of the new Republic, Chinese troops would be able to resist the Japanese in Taiwan without technically breaching the terms of the treaty, and if they were successful, Taiwan could return to Chinese rule at some future date (in this respect, it was significant that the nominally-independent Republic acknowledge the suzerainty of China.). There was, therefore, little sympathy in Europe for the Republic, despite its "Parisian" manifesto.

There was also a lack of support for the Formosan resistance movement in Beijing, as considerable diplomatic efforts were then underway to persuade Japan to relinquish the Liaodong Peninsula. Under the terms of the Treaty of Shimonoseki, China had agreed to cede the peninsula to Japan, but once the treaty's contents became known, there was alarm in Europe at Japan's rapacity. In a diplomatic démarche known as the Triple Intervention, Russia, France, and Germany put pressure on Japan in late April 1895 to restore the peninsula to China. On 5 May, the Japanese agreed to retrocede the Liaodong Peninsula to China in return for an increased indemnity; however, it took until December 1895 to negotiate the necessary treaty amendments, and while the negotiations were in progress Japanese troops remained in place.

Flag of the Republic of Formosa, 1895

During this period, Empress Dowager Cixi and her officials had considerable reasons not to offend Japan; the Qing court was horrified when it heard the news in mid-May that several officials in Taiwan intended to resist the Japanese occupation and that there was talk of setting up a Republic that recognised Qing suzerainty. Shortly before the proclamation of the Republic of Formosa, the Qing court ordered Li Jingfang, the nephew and adopted son of China's elder statesman Li Hongzhang, to proceed to Taiwan and formally transfer sovereignty over the island from China to Japan. It also cabled an imperial edict to Taipei on 20 May, directing Tang Jingsong to order all Qing civil officials and all officers and soldiers to leave Taiwan, with Tang himself ordered to return to Beijing.

Spurned by European public opinion and disavowed by China, the Republic of Formosa enjoyed only one week of uninterrupted existence. During this time, it decked itself out with the conventional trappings of sovereignty. The Republicans adopted a national flag with a yellow tiger on a blue background, ordered a large silver state seal to be made, and began to issue paper money and postage stamps in the name of the Republic. The foreign minister Chen Jitong, who had lived in France for many years, was responsible for crafting much of this republican symbolism.

== Course of the war ==
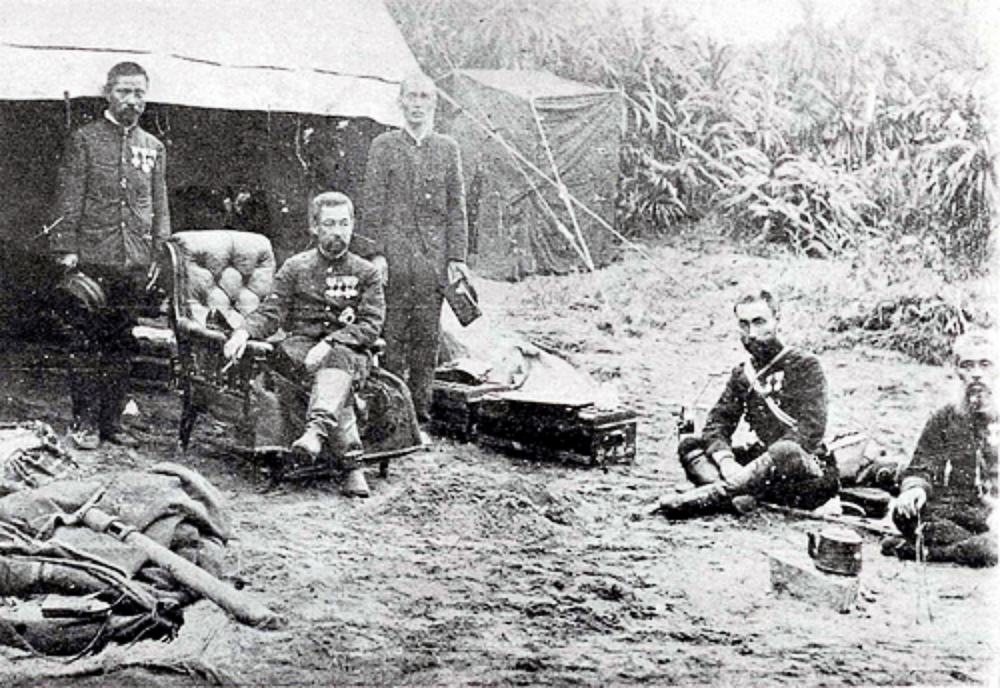
Prince Kitashirakawa Yoshihisa and his staff at Audi during the Japanese landing

=== First phase: Keelung, Taipei and Tamsui ===
==== Ruifang and Keelung ====
During this time, the Japanese were making their preparations for occupying Taiwan in accordance with the provisions of the Treaty of Shimonoseki. The task of securing Japan's new colony was entrusted to the Imperial Guards Division, which had seen no action during the fighting in Manchuria. 7,000 guardsmen, under the command of Prince Kitashirakawa Yoshihisa, left Port Arthur on 22 May, on board fourteen transports.

The preparations for the expedition were made in such haste that there was no time to issue the guardsmen with summer uniforms, and they left for the hot and humid climate of Taiwan in the heavy winter clothes they had been wearing in cold weather of Manchuria. On 26 May, the transports, escorted by the warships Matsushima and Naniwa, reached the Japanese-owned Ryukyu Islands to the northeast of Taiwan and anchored off the port of Nakagusuku on the eastern coast of Okinawa.

On 27 May, the recently appointed governor-general of Formosa, Admiral Kabayama Sukenori, joined the expedition from Tokyo. In view of the reports that had reached Japan that the leaders of the self-styled Republic of Formosa were making preparations to resist a Japanese landing, Kabayama felt that there was no time to lose. Consequently, he ordered the ships to set sail for Taiwan at noon the same day. On 29 May, the first troops of the Imperial Guards Division went ashore on the northern coast of Taiwan at Samtiao Point near the village of Audi (a small village in Gongliao), several miles to the east of Keelung. The Japanese had originally intended to land at Tamsui, but finding the town strongly defended, they changed their plans at the last moment. The landing marked the beginning of the war, with the first major engagement taking place on 2 June at Ruifang, in which the defending Chinese forces were defeated.

On 3 June, the Japanese captured the port city of Keelung, where, following a preliminary bombardment of the city's coastal defences by the warships Matsushima, Oshima, Naniwa, Takachiho and Chiyoda, the Imperial Guards attacked the Keelung forts from the rear. The main engagement, known as the Battle of Keelung, took place around the Shiqiuling battery (Chinese: 獅球嶺砲台). Eleven years earlier, during the Sino-French War, Chinese forces had bottled up a French expeditionary corps in Keelung for seven months during the Keelung Campaign, and the Shiqiuling battery had been held against the French for most of the war. Now, in 1895, the Japanese routed the fort's garrison and captured the fort with little loss. Keelung was occupied on the afternoon of 3 June, after the Qing commanders fled the city and left the garrison force leaderless. Japanese casualties in the battle for Keelung were 2 dead and 26 wounded.

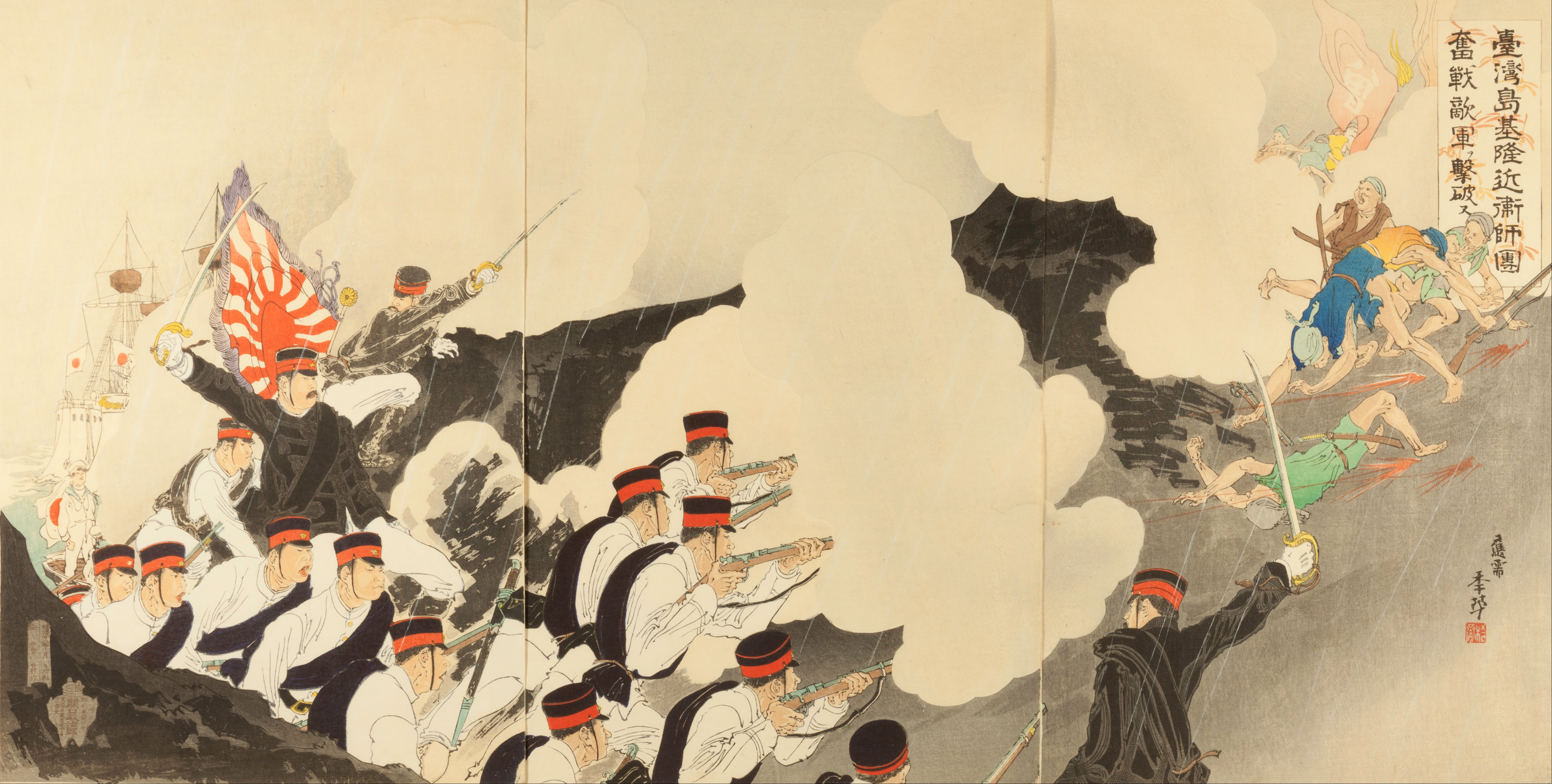
A Japanese triptych woodblock print of the Japanese invasion of Taiwan, made by Toshihide Migita.

==== Transfer of sovereignty ====
While the conflict continued at Keelung, sovereignty over Taiwan was formally transferred from China to Japan at a ceremony held on the morning of 3 June aboard one of the Japanese warships in Keelung harbour. Japan and China were represented at the ceremony by two plenipotentiaries (diplomats): Governor-General Kabayama for Japan and Li Jingfang (the adopted son of Li Hongzhang) for China. Li Hongzhang's numerous enemies had arranged for his son to handle the task of presiding over the surrender of Taiwan to the Japanese.

While the Japanese had wanted to stage the handover ceremony ashore, in the capital, Taipei, that arrangement would have been dangerous for Li Jingfang; his father Li Hongzhang was the negotiator of the Treaty of Shimonoseki that ceded Taiwan to Japan, so he was detested by the islanders, who were further angered by his son's involvement in formally ceding Chinese sovereignty over the island. Placards were posted in towns across Taiwan vowing eternal hatred to Li Hongzhang and his family, and Li Jingfang was forced to request the Japanese to hold the transfer ceremony at sea rather than ashore: the request was granted.

===== Tang Jingsong's flight =====
When the news of the defeat at Keelung reached Taipei on 4 June, the republican leaders fled. During the night of 4 June, President Tang and General Chiu escaped to Tamsui, and from there sailed for the mainland on the evening of 6 June aboard the steamship Arthur. Their departure was delayed for a day because of disorder in Tamsui (see below).

==== Japanese occupation of Taipei ====
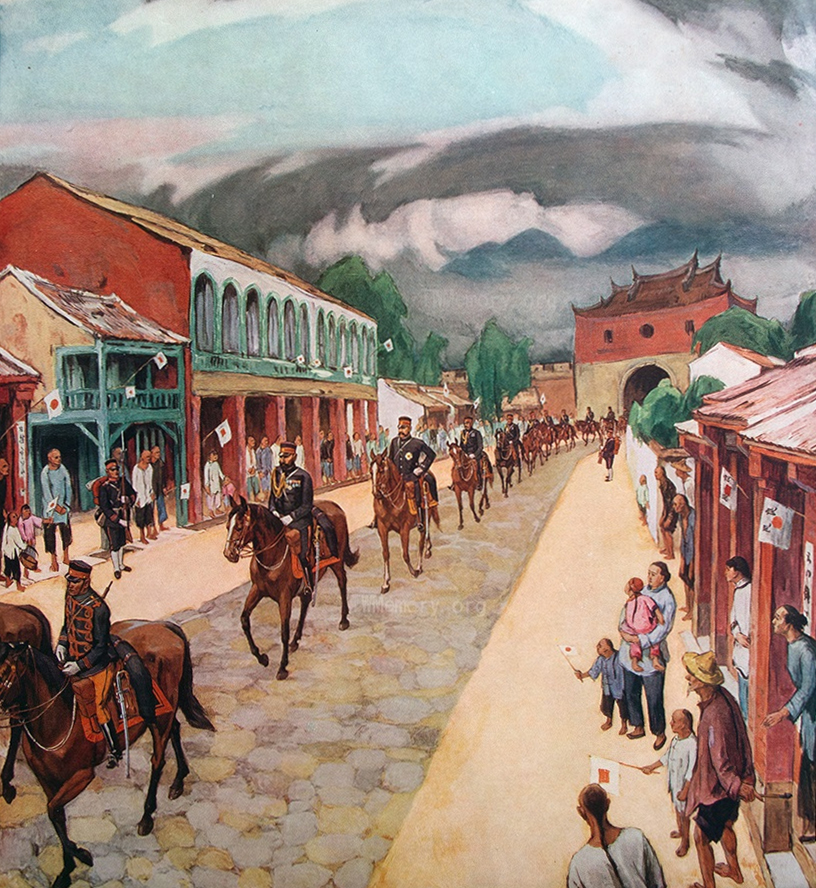
Japanese troops occupy Taipei, 7 June 1895

Leaderless and without pay, the troops of the Taipei garrison abandoned their posts and began looting the city. The city's powder magazine was fired, and there were several fatal shootings. Alarmed at the growing chaos, a number of local businessmen, including the influential Koo Hsien-jung, decided to invite the Japanese in. On Koo's initiative, three representatives of the city's foreign community left Taipei, intending to make contact with the Japanese forces in Keelung and urge them to enter Taipei to restore order. The foreign envoys met a Japanese force at Xizhi on 6 June, and when he learned of the growing disorder in Taipei, the Japanese commander ordered an advance to occupy the city. The first Japanese troops entered Taipei at dawn on 7 June, and during the next two days suppressed the riots. Most of the Chinese soldiers in Taipei surrendered their weapons without resistance.

Hobe Fort, Tamsui

==== Japanese occupation of Tamsui ====
During the first week of June, while the Japanese were securing Keelung and advancing on Taipei, law and order broke down in Tamsui. On 5 June, Tang Jingsong and several senior ministers boarded the steamship Arthur at Tamsui, intending to escape to mainland China, and it was rumoured that they had with them large sums of money owed in pay to the Chinese garrisons of the northern towns. Large numbers of Chinese soldiers retreating from Keelung had poured into Tamsui on 4 June, and on 5 June, a party of soldiers boarded the steamship and extorted $45,000 from its passengers. The money was distributed among the various infantry units present in Tamsui.

On the evening of 5 June, the gunners of Tamsui's Hobe Fort threatened to fire on the steamship unless a suitable bribe was found. The European employees of the Maritime Customs raised the sum demanded ($5,000) during the night and handed it over to the gunners in return for the breechblocks of the fort's four Krupp cannons. The Hobe Fort, the "lock and key of the northern gate" (北門鎖鑰) as the Chinese called it, had been built only a few years earlier at great expense by the Chinese governor Liu Mingchuan; however, it was disarmed before it ever fired a shot at the Japanese.

During the afternoon of 6 June, the steamship Arthur attempted to leave Tamsui since the captain believed it was safe to do so, but it was fired on several times by a Chinese field battery. Around fifty Chinese soldiers aboard the steamship were wounded by the exploding shells and several soldiers were killed, including the captain of Tang Jingsong's bodyguard. The German gunboat Iltis, which had been sent to Tamsui to protect the town's European residents, immediately replied, putting the Chinese battery out of action. The Arthur left Tamsui that evening with Tang Jingsong and most of the senior officers of the republic on board.

The Chinese troops in Tamsui began to loot the town, targeting wealthy foreign residences first, but the presence of Iltis and the British gunboat Redbreast deterred them from attacking the foreigners physically. The arrival of the Japanese helped to restore order: on 7 June, two Japanese warships entered Tamsui harbour, and their appearance quickly put an end to the looting. On 8 June, eighteen Japanese cavalry troopers advanced northwards from Taipei and occupied Tamsui without firing a shot: several hundred Chinese soldiers surrendered.

==== Political developments ====
On 14 June, Admiral Kabayama arrived in Taipei, and announced the establishment of Japanese administration in Taiwan. With northern Taiwan under their control, the Japanese repatriated the thousands of Chinese soldiers captured at Keelung, Taipei and Tamsui during the brief campaign. Japanese transports ferried them across the Formosa Strait and to the Fukienese port of Amoy.

The first phase of the campaign had seen the flight of the Republican president Tang Jingsong, the Japanese occupation of Keelung, Taipei and Tamsui and the surrender of the Republican garrisons in northern Taiwan. It was generally expected, both by the Japanese and by foreign observers, that resistance to the Japanese occupation of Taiwan would now cease. The American war correspondent James W. Davidson commented:

At 2 a.m. on 5 June the yellow Republican Tiger gathered in his long tail and laid down and died for lack of nourishment.

The expectation for an early end to the war proved to be premature. By the end of June, it was clear that opposition to the Japanese invasion would likely continue until the island's main towns were occupied by force. Popular resistance to the Japanese invasion gradually grew, slowing the Japanese advance south from Taipei, and on 26 June, the presidency of the Formosan Republic was assumed by Liu Yongfu in Tainan: this succession, which effectively transferred the republican capital from Taipei to Tainan, prolonged the Republic's existence for another five months.

=== Second Phase: Hsinchu, Miaoli and Changhua ===
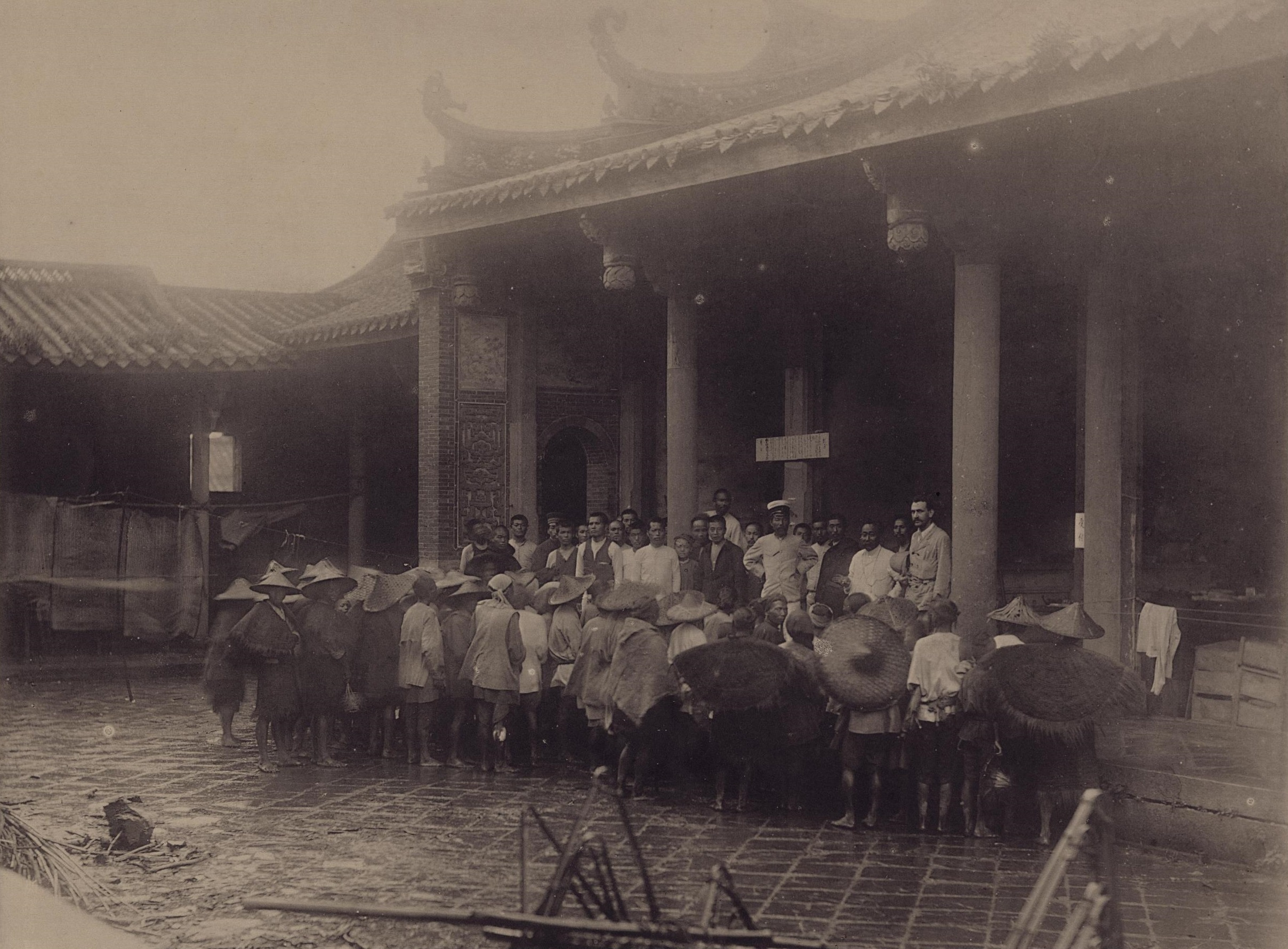
A Japanese military interpreter giving orders to the Chinese coolies at the Confucius temple in Hsinchu. James W. Davidson, a war correspondent for the New York Herald, was also present.

The capture of Tainan became a political as well as strategic imperative for the Japanese. However, faced with growing resistance to their occupation, the Japanese were unable to advance on the city immediately. During the second phase of the campaign, from June to August, the Japanese secured central Taiwan by occupying Miaoli and Changhua. They then paused for a month, and only embarked on the third and final phase of the campaign, the advance on Tainan, in October.

==== Japanese capture of Hsinchu ====
On 11 June, the Imperial Guards Division left Taipei and began to advance south: its immediate objectives were Tokoham and Hsinchu. The Japanese captured Hsinchu with little resistance on 22 June, as Chinese troops of the Hsinchu garrison removed their uniforms and handed over their weapons to the Japanese as soon as they entered the city.

==== Formosan militia operations around Hsinchu ====
The Japanese had mostly been fighting Qing regular troops, most of whom wanted to leave Taiwan and return to their homes in mainland China as soon as possible. They had little stomach for fighting the Japanese, and made no attempt to defeat them when they did fight. James Davidson, who had seen them in action for himself at Keelung, Taipei, Tamsui and Hsinchu, had severe criticism of their performance:

The Chinese troops equipped with good weapons or bad, without drill, and unskilled in foreign tactics, protected by magnificent forts with big modern guns, or behind mudwalls with jingals, conducted themselves always with scarcely a redeeming feature. Their forces never advanced to make an attack unless they were confident that their position permitted of an easy retreat and that they greatly outnumbered their opponents. I know of hardly a single instance where, in the clearing, they have held their own against an approaching force, under anywhere near equal conditions. It is a usual manoeuvre for the Chinese to draw themselves up in mighty splendour on some open plot of ground in full view of the enemy, and should the latter advance towards them, to commence to fire off every available firearm, although they may be entirely out of range. This continues until the enemy has advanced sufficiently near to make his bullets felt in the Chinese ranks, and then there is a scatter and a scramble for a safer position, where their forces rally again to repeat the same tactics as before.

After the fall of Hsinchu, however, locally recruited Formosan troops began to take the lead in the fighting against the Japanese. In particular, Hakka militia units led by the young commanders Jiang Shaozu, Wu Tangxing, and Xu Xiang put up strong resistance to the Japanese advance. Between 24 and 26 June, the Japanese had to turn back to An-ping-chin and fight a major engagement to capture the heights of the Eighteen Peaks. The Japanese, with superior training and better weapons, eventually succeeded in throwing the Formosans off the mountain. Although defeated, the Formosans remained for several days in the vicinity of Hsinchu, demonstrating on more than one occasion against the city.

On 10 July, the Japanese again confronted the Hakka militias, this time on the heights of Jianbishan near Miaoli. The Formosans were entrenched, but had no modern artillery; the Japanese attacked from two sides and defeated them. Japanese casualties were only 11 killed or wounded, while the bodies of 200 dead Formosans were recovered from the battlefield. The Japanese also took 110 prisoners, one of whom was the 19-year-old militia leader Jiang Shaoxu. On 11 July, Jiang committed suicide by eating raw opium. Wu Tangxing assumed command of the Hakka militias, and on 23 July, led them in retreat to Miaoli.

==== Guerrilla operations behind Japanese lines ====
In June and July 1895, while Formosan militia units challenged the Japanese advance on the battlefield, groups of Formosan insurgents began to attack isolated couriers and small groups of Japanese soldiers on the routes between Taipei and Hsinchu, behind Japanese lines. The attackers were often villagers who had formally surrendered on the approach of Japanese columns, and foreign observers condemned their utilisation of the white flag:

The greatest obstacle that the Japanese encountered was the smiling villagers who stood in their doorways, over which they had flown a white flag, watching the troops pass by. For these natives the Japanese had at first a kind word and a smile. But scarcely were the troops out of sight before guns were brought out through the same doorways and shots fired at the first unfortunate party whose numbers were sufficiently small to make it appear safe to the treacherous occupants. Troops now return and find the mutilated bodies of their companions in the streets; while at the doors and windows of the houses near, are the same grinning fiends and the same little white flag, an emblem of peace, still floating over their guilty heads.

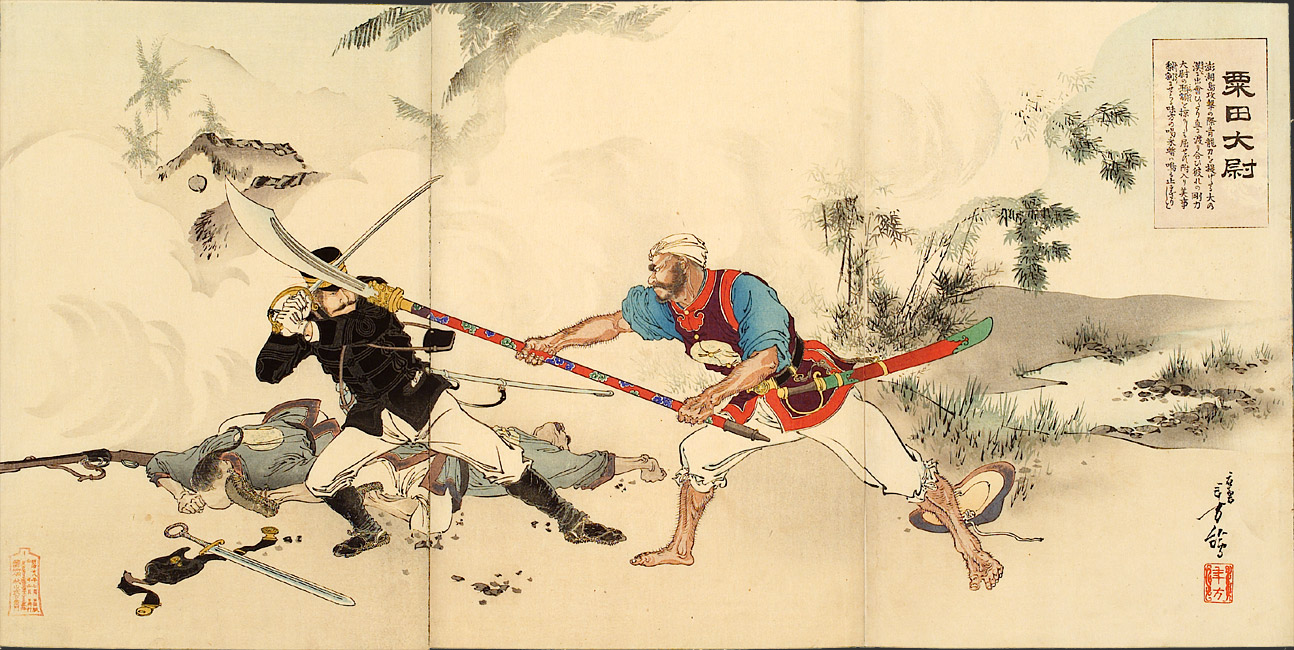
A Japanese triptych woodblock print depicting a native fighter attacking a Japanese officer with a halberd.

The Japanese took brutal reprisals whenever such incidents occurred, shooting suspected villagers and burning down whole villages.

One of the most successful insurgent attacks was made on 11 July on a party of 35 Japanese infantrymen who were conveying supplies by boat from Taipei to Tokoham. The Japanese were ambushed and all but one of the party were either killed or so badly wounded that they committed suicide rather than fall into their enemies' hands alive. However, the Japanese pursued the insurgents and defeated them on 12 July in an engagement at Long-tampo.

During the last week in July, the Japanese twice despatched coordinated expeditions from Taipei, Tokoham and Haisoankau to clear Formosan guerrillas away from their supply lines, engaging large insurgent forces at Sankakeng (modern-day Sanxia) on 22 and 23 July and at Sinpu on 2 August. During both sweeps, the Japanese inflicted heavy losses on the insurgents and suffered relatively few casualties in return.

==== Japanese capture of Miaoli ====
On 6 August, the Imperial Guards Division left Hsinchu and advanced towards Miaoli. On 6 and 7 August, two Japanese columns drove Formosan insurgent forces away from Hsinchu, occupying the resistance centre of Beipu. On 8 and 9 August, the Japanese fought a major battle to drive a large force of insurgents from a series of strong positions on the heights of Cha-pi-shan, to the north of Tiongkang. On 11 August, the Japanese occupied Aulang. On 13 August, they fought another battle to dislodge a force of insurgents from the hilltop position of Chenkansoan, against strong Formosan resistance. On 14 August, the Japanese entered Miaoli county; there was no resistance, as most of the population had fled.

==== Japanese victory at Baguashan and capture of Changhua ====
The next major Japanese objective on the route south was the walled city of Changhua. The Formosans were reported to have massed their forces there to fight a major defensive battle, and Liu Yongfu was said to have reinforced the Formosan militia with a number of elite Black Flag units from his southern army. Capturing Changhua was a formidable challenge for the Japanese: the heights of Baguashan, to the north of the city, were fortified, and defended by a strong artillery position, the Bagua battery (Traditional Chinese: 八卦砲台). During the third week of August, the Japanese brought up supplies and made preparations for what they expected to be the decisive battle of the campaign.

The Japanese resumed their advance from Miaoli on 24 August, occupying the large village of Koloton on 24 August. On 25 August, continuing their advance towards the Toa-to-kei river to the north of Changhua, the Japanese were ambushed by a large insurgent force in the fortified village of Tokabio. The Japanese fought all day to clear the insurgents from their line of advance, but the village was not completely taken until the morning of 26 August. During the evening of 26 August, the Japanese closed up to the Toa-to-kei river and prepared to assault the Formosan positions around Changhua.

During the night of 26 August, the Japanese crossed the Toa-to-kei river under cover of darkness, and at dawn on 27 August, separate Japanese columns made a surprise attack on the Bagua battery and Changhua. In a short early morning engagement, generally known as the Battle of Baguashan, the Japanese stormed the Bagua battery and occupied Changhua. The Formosans suffered heavy casualties, and two of their commanders, Wu Tangxing and Wu Pengnian, were killed. The Formosan forces fell back to Chiayi and Lukang. The battle of Baguashan, the largest pitched battle ever fought on Taiwanese soil, was the decisive engagement of the invasion, and its loss contributed to the eventual defeat of the Formosan Republic: though they delayed a total defeat through subsequent engagements.

The Japanese victory was decisive, leading foreign observers to praise the courage and skill with which the Japanese troops had captured such a strong position so quickly. For the Japanese, the opportunity to defeat the Formosans in the open field was welcomed after the weeks of guerrilla fighting they had experienced since the start of their march south from Taipei. The battle put an end to organized resistance against the Japanese in central Taiwan. However, the Japanese did not follow up on their victory immediately: after securing the coastal port of Lukang and the town of Perto at the end of August, the Imperial Guards temporarily halted their advance. During September, they consolidated their positions around Changhua and awaited the arrival of substantial reinforcements from Japan at the beginning of October. During this lull in the campaign, a severe outbreak of malaria at Changhua swept through the Japanese forces, killing more than 2,000 men.

==== Japanese capture of Talibu ====
The only significant military action in central Taiwan during the weeks following the Japanese capture of Changhua was a series of engagements in early September around Yunlin. On 3 September, the insurgents attacked the small Japanese garrison of the village of Toapona, to the south of Changhua. Japanese reinforcements came up, and the insurgents were defeated and retreated towards Yunlin. A Japanese infantry company in the vicinity attacked the retreating insurgents, and during the evening of 3 September, pursued them as far as the walled city of Talibu, whose defences it scouted. Three days later, during the night of 5 September, the Japanese returned and made a surprise night attack on Talibu. The Japanese vanguard scaled the city walls and opened the gates for the remaining forces to enter the city, firing volleys. The Chinese garrison fled in confusion, and by 5 a.m. on 6 September, Talibu was occupied by the Japanese. Chinese and Formosan losses during these few days of fighting amounted to 130 killed, while Japanese losses were only eight men killed and wounded.

=== Third Phase: Chiayi, Takow and Tainan ===
==== Three-pronged advance ====
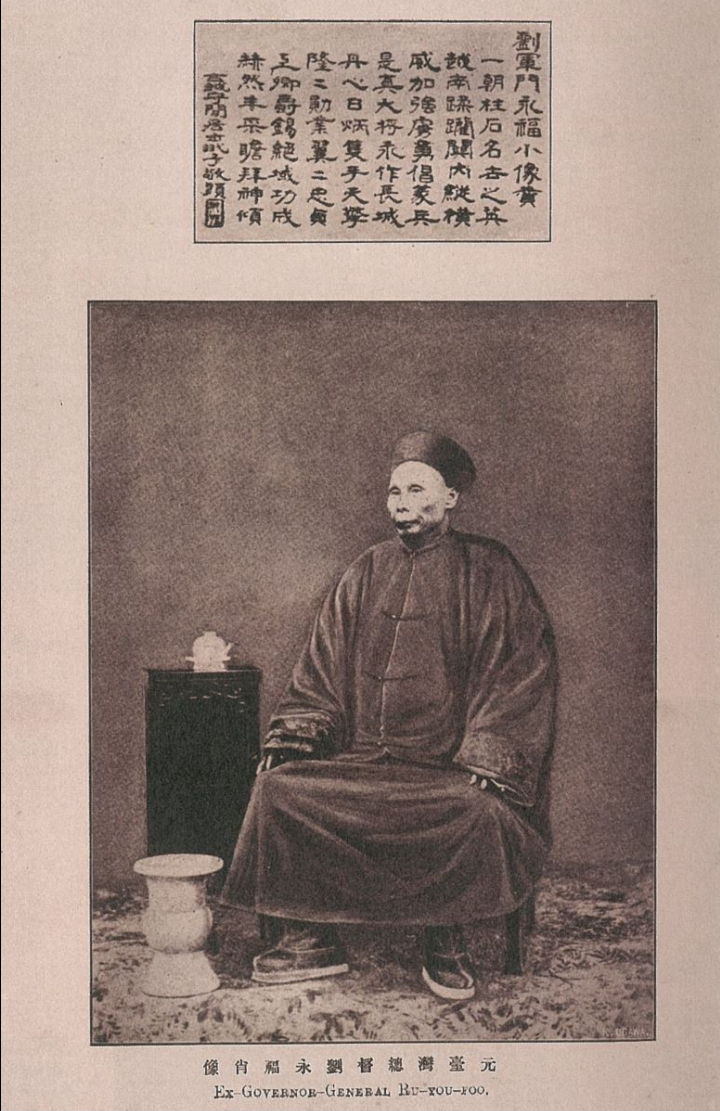
Liu Yongfu (1837–1917)

The Japanese resumed their advance on Tainan in the second week of October. The arrival of reinforcements (the 2nd Provincial Division, transferred from the Japanese 2nd Army in Manchuria, and part of the 4th Provincial Division, from Osaka) enabled them to approach Tainan from three directions at once. On 10 October, two task forces sailed from the Penghu Islands. The smaller task force, 5,460 troops under the command of Prince Fushimi Sadanaru, landed at Budai, 28 miles (45 km) to the north of Tainan. The larger task force, 6,330 troops under the command of Lieutenant-General Nogi Maresuke, landed at Fangliao, 25 miles (40 km) to the south of Takow and well to the south of Tainan. Its first objective was to capture the port of Takow.

Meanwhile, the Imperial Guards Division, then at Changhua, was ordered to continue to press forward towards Tainan. The division, 14,000 strong when it landed in Taiwan at the end of May, had been so reduced by sickness that it could only manage to put 7,000 men into the field. Nevertheless, the Japanese had enough of an advantage in numbers to make an end of the campaign. Just under 20,000 Japanese troops began to close in on Tainan simultaneously, from the north, the northeast, and the south.

==== Japanese capture of Yunlin and Chiayi ====
The Imperial Guards Division commenced its march south from Changhua on 3 October. On 6 October, the division's advance guard defeated a force of 3,000 insurgents at Talibu. On 7 October, the division fought an important action with the insurgents at Yunlin, driving them from a series of fortified positions. On 9 October, the division fought the second-largest battle of the campaign, the Battle of Chiayi, to storm the walled city of Chiayi, where the insurgents were making their stand.

According to report, the Chinese and Formosans numbered 10,000 men and included both regular and volunteer units. The true figure was probably around 3,000 men, but the insurgents were reinforced by 600 Black Flags, who were fighting the Japanese for the first time during the campaign, and also deployed cannon and machine guns on the city walls. After a preliminary bombardment with their mountain artillery, the Japanese scaled the walls and broke into the city. The insurgents were defeated, leaving over 200 dead on the field. Total casualties in the Imperial Guards Division in the engagements fought between 3 and 9 October were 14 killed and 54 wounded. The division was ordered to halt at Chiayi and wait until Prince Fushimi's northern expedition went ashore at Budai before resuming its advance.

==== Liu Yongfu's conditional surrender offer ====
On 10 October, discouraged by the news of the fall of Chiayi, Liu Yongfu made an offer of conditional surrender to the Japanese. He asked that no Formosan should be punished for having taken up arms against the Japanese, and that all Chinese soldiers still in Taiwan should be treated hospitably and repatriated to Canton or Amoy. The surrender offer was conveyed to the Japanese headquarters at Magong in the Penghu Islands by the British warship HMS Pique, and the Japanese replied that they would send a warship to Anping, the outport of Tainan, on 12 October to discuss Liu's proposals. On 12 October, the Japanese cruiser Yoshino arrived off Anping, but Liu Yongfu refused to go aboard, perhaps fearing treachery. The Japanese subsequently informed him that they would accept only unconditional surrender.

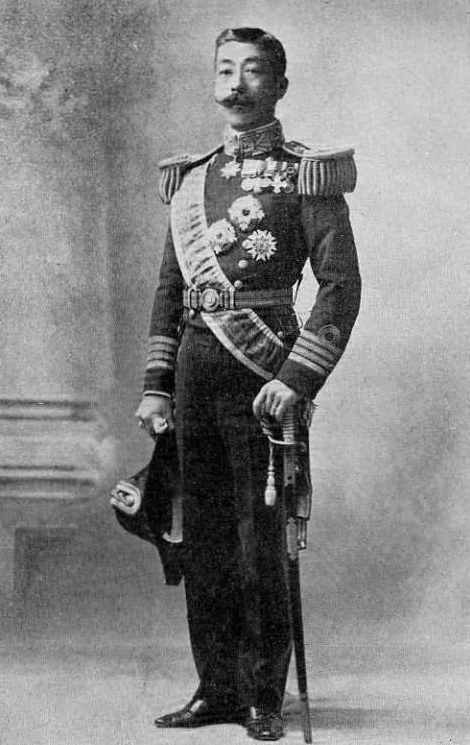
Fleet Admiral His Imperial Highness Prince Yorihito Higashi-Fushimi

==== Japanese victory at Shau-lan ====
Meanwhile, the other two Japanese columns were involved in combat. Prince Fushimi's northern column, which included the 5th and 17th Infantry Regiments, landed at Budai on 10 October. The division fought several conflicts during its advance southwards, including a conflict at Kaw-wah-tau on 12 October, in which Japanese casualties were minor. They also fought near Kiu-sui-kei on 16 October to disengage a company of the 17th Regiment which had been surrounded by insurgents, in which the Japanese suffered casualties of 9 dead and 10 wounded, and the insurgents had at least 60 fatalities.

On 18 October, the 5th Infantry Regiment, supported by a battery of artillery and a troop of cavalry, routed the insurgents at Ongo-ya-toi. Japanese casualties were 3 dead and 14 wounded, while insurgent losses numbered 80 dead. On the same day, the 17th Regiment met the Formosans at Tion-sha and won a victory. Formosan losses were estimated at around 400 killed, while only one officer was wounded on the Japanese side.

Meanwhile, the brigade's advance guard dislodged an insurgent force numbering around 4,000 men and armed with repeating rifles from the village of Mao-tau, to the south of the So-bung-go River, but suffered relatively high casualties in the process. On 19 October, in a battle to capture the fortified village of Shau-lan, the Japanese 17th Regiment trapped a force of 3,000 insurgents inside the village and stormed it, resulting in serious casualties on the Formosan side: nearly a thousand insurgent bodies were counted after the massacre, while Japanese losses were 30 men killed or wounded, including 3 officers.

==== Japanese capture of Takow ====
Lieutenant-General Nogi's southern column, consisting of 6,330 soldiers, 1,600 military coolies (forced labourers), and 2,500 horses, landed at Fangliao on 10 October, and engaged a force of Formosan militiamen at Jiadong on 11 October. The Battle of Jiadong was a Japanese victory, but the Japanese suffered their heaviest combat casualties of the campaign in the engagement: 16 men killed and 61 wounded, including three officers among the casualties.

On 15 October, Nogi's column closed in on the important port of Takow, but discovered that the Japanese navy had arrived first; two days earlier, on 13 October, the Takow forts had been bombarded and subdued by the Japanese cruisers Yoshino, Naniwa, Akitsushima, Hiei, Yaeyama and Saien, and a naval landing force had been put ashore to occupy the town. Nogi's men pressed on, and captured the town of Pithau on 16 October. By 20 October, they were at the village of Ji-chang-hang, only a few miles south of Tainan. There, on the night of 20 October, they received an offer of unconditional surrender from the Chinese merchants of Tainan.

==== Liu Yongfu's flight ====
All three Japanese columns were now within striking distance of Tainan, and on 20 October, realising that the war was lost, Liu Yongfu disguised himself as a coolie and fled to Amoy in mainland China aboard the British merchant ship SS Thales. The ship was pursued by the Japanese cruiser Yaeyama and boarded by Japanese sailors, who did not recognise Liu Yongfu but arrested him and several of his companions out of suspicion. The British captain protested vigorously at the illegal search, and when the merchant ship reached Amoy, the detainees, including Liu Yongfu, were released. Only later did the Japanese realise how close they had come to capturing Liu, and Admiral Arichi Shinanojo, the Japanese fleet commander in the invasion of Taiwan, was forced to resign as a result of a subsequent British complaint to Japan.

==== Capitulation of Tainan ====
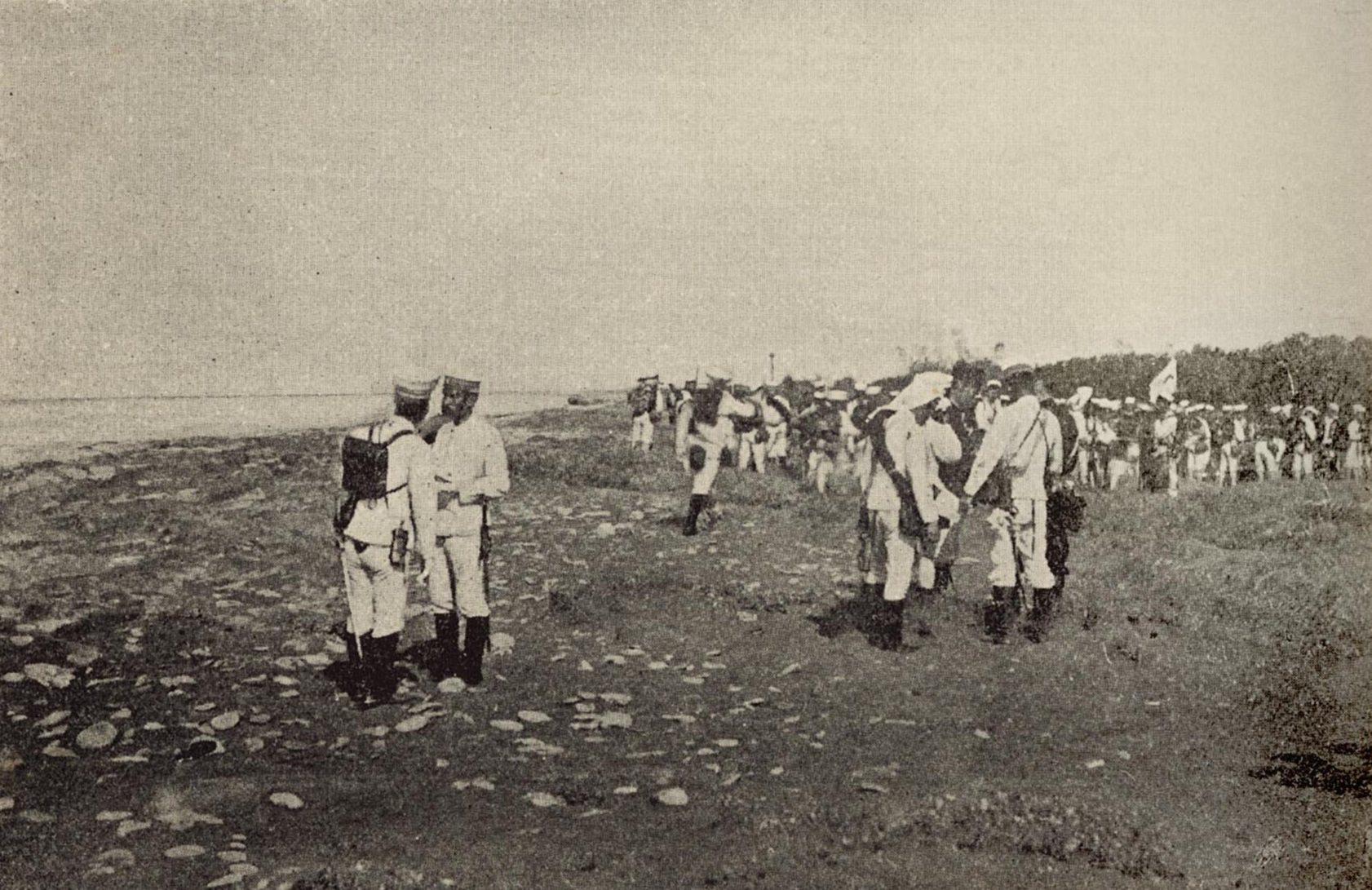
Japanese soldiers of the 4th Infantry Regiment landing at Fangliao, 11 October 1895

Tainan capitulated to the Japanese on 21 October: the surrender put an end to serious Formosan resistance and effectively inaugurated the era of Japanese colonial rule in Taiwan. Japanese historian and politician Takekoshi Yosaburō gave the following account of the surrender of Tainan:

After General Liu's flight, the remains of his party wandered about the city not knowing what to do, until the foreigners, afraid that they would begin plundering, managed to persuade them to lay down their arms. This operation took the whole of one day, between 7,000 and 8,000 rifles being eventually placed in secure custody. Then two English missionaries, Messrs. Fergusson and Barclay, went to the Japanese headquarters a few miles south of the city, bearing a letter from the Chinese residents saying that the soldiers had all laid down their arms and disappeared, and asking the Japanese to come quickly and enforce order. General Nogi entered the city on 21 October and the rest of the army soon followed. Thus Formosa came into our possession in reality as well as in name.

== Casualties ==
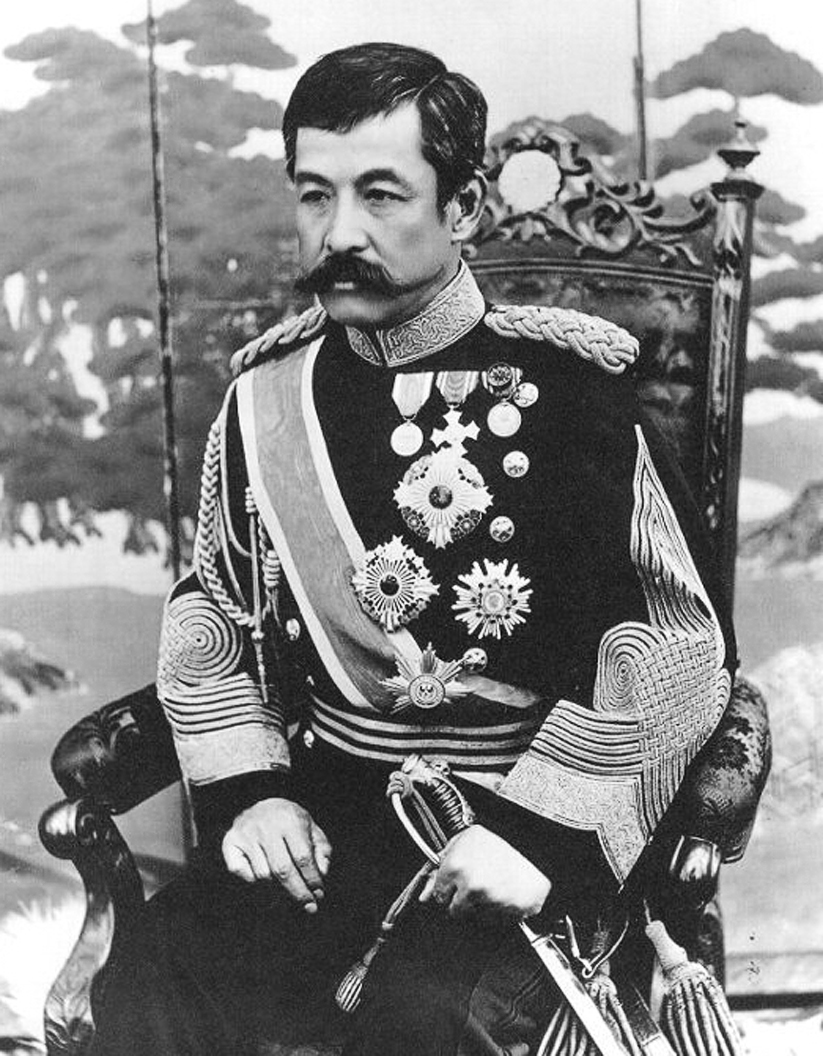
Prince Kitashirakawa Yoshihisa (1847–95)

Japanese combat casualties in the invasion of Taiwan were relatively light: 164 officers and men killed, and 515 wounded. Casualties from disease, particularly cholera and malaria, were far higher. The cholera outbreak in the Penghu Islands at the end of March 1895 killed more than 1,500 soldiers, and an even higher number of Japanese soldiers died in September 1895 in the wake of the malaria outbreak at Changhua shortly after their victory. According to Japanese sources, 4,642 soldiers died in Taiwan and the Penghu Islands of disease. By the end of the campaign, 5,246 Japanese soldiers had been hospitalised in Taiwan, and a further 21,748 soldiers had been evacuated back to Japan for treatment.

Japanese casualties from disease included Prince Kitashirakawa Yoshihisa, who fell ill with malaria on 18 October: his condition rapidly worsened, and he died in Tainan on 28 October, seven days after the city's capitulation to the Japanese. His body was carried to Anping, the port of Tainan, by a troop of wrestlers who, by special imperial permission, had accompanied the Imperial Guards Division, and shipped back to Japan for burial aboard the steamer Saikio Maru. The cruiser Yoshino escorted the prince's body back to Japan. At the time, a rumor was widely circulated in Taiwan that the cause of the prince's death was a wound he received during the Battle of Baguashan, but it was unfounded.

Chinese and Formosan casualties were far higher, but are difficult to estimate: the Japanese recovered the dead bodies of around 7,000 opposing soldiers from the various battlefields of the war, and the total number of Chinese and Formosan dead has been estimated at around 14,000.

== Aftermath ==
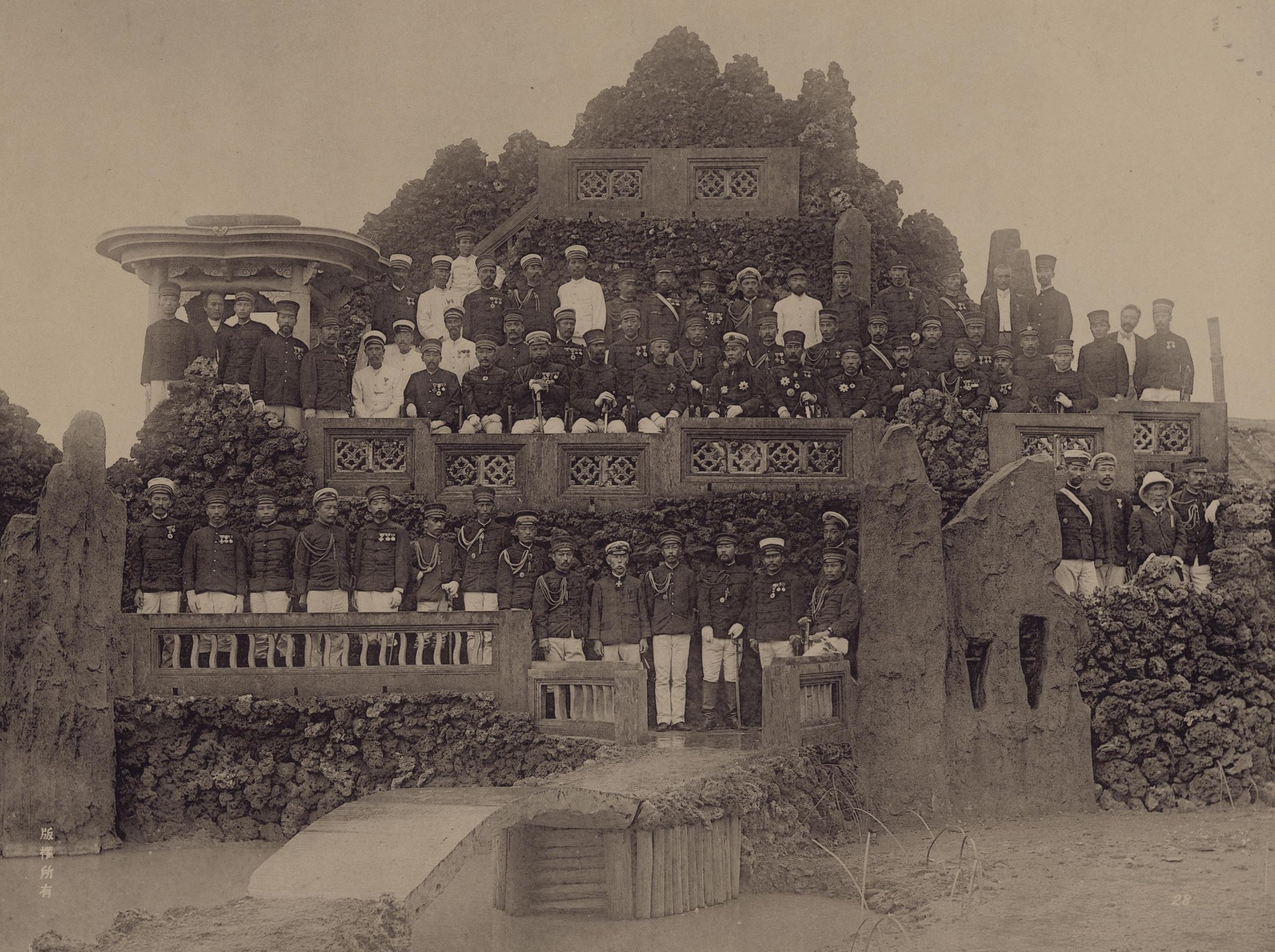
Prince Fushimi Sadanaru and Japanese officers during a visit to the Government General's house (formerly Chinese administrative office) in Taipei, 30 September 1895

According to a passage in The Cambrige Modern History, Volumne 12:

The cession of the island to Japan was received with such disfavour by the Chinese inhabitants that a large military force was required to effect its occupation. For nearly two years afterwards, a bitter guerrilla resistance was offered to the Japanese troops, and large forces – over 100,000 men, it was stated at the time – were required for its suppression. This was not accomplished without much cruelty on the part of the conquerors, who, in their march through the island, perpetrated all the worst excesses of war. They had, undoubtedly, considerable provocation. They were constantly attacked by ambushed enemies, and their losses from battle and disease far exceeded the entire loss of the whole Japanese army throughout the Manchurian campaign. But their revenge was often taken on innocent villagers. Men, women, and children were ruthlessly slaughtered or became the victims of unrestrained lust and rapine. The result was to drive from their homes thousands of industrious and peaceful peasants, who, long after the main resistance had been completely crushed, continued to wage a vendetta war, and to generate feelings of hatred which the succeeding years of conciliation and good government have not wholly eradicated. – The Cambridge Modern History, Volume 12

The Japanese went on a six-week-long killing spree, in which they massacred Hakka village peasants en masse in retaliation for the murder of Japanese teachers by Hakkas in the Shihlin suburb of Taipei.

The last Formosan militia units still under arms were defeated on 26 November 1895 at the Battle of Changhsing, popularly known in Taiwan as the Battle of the Burning Village. During this battle, Japanese troops stormed the village of Changhsing, Pingtung and burned it down, despite determined resistance by a force of Hakka militiamen and armed Hakka villagers under the command of Chiu Feng-yang (邱鳳揚). The surviving Formosans dispersed after this defeat.

Although the Treaty of Shimonoseki had surrendered Taiwan and the Penghu Islands to Japan, the success of the Japanese invasion of Taiwan confirmed their possession over the regions. Taiwan remained firmly under the control of Japan until 1945, and all regular units of the Chinese army still on the island were either disbanded or repatriated to China. Meanwhile, businessmen who had backed the Japanese during the invasion prospered under their rule: Koo Hsien-jung, who had invited the Japanese into Taipei in the early days of June 1895, was granted exclusive business rights in Taiwan, making him the wealthiest Taiwanese man of his time. Eventually, his son Koo Chen-fu inherited his wealth and founded the Koos Group, which dominated the business sector of modern Taiwan.

Although the Japanese army had defeated the Chinese regular and Formosan militia forces with little difficulty, a number of locally raised guerrilla bands maintained an insurgency against the Japanese for the next seven years. The insurgency initially flourished because the bulk of the Japanese invasion force was repatriated after the surrender of Tainan, so for several months there were relatively few Japanese troops left on the ground in Taiwan. The Japanese responded to the continuing resistance with a carefully calibrated 'stick and carrot' policy, granting clemency to insurgents who laid down their arms, while killing those that did not, and taking brutal reprisals against villages believed to be sheltering insurgents.

Nitobe Inazō, a Japanese diplomat and former director of the Bureau of Industries in the Government of Formosa, wrote:

"Though the island was pacified no one knew what was to happen next. We did not understand the character of the people. Very few Japanese could speak Formosan and fewer Formosans could speak Japanese. There was naturally mutual distrust and suspicion. The bandits abounded everywhere. Under these conditions military rule was the only form of government that could be adopted until better assurance could be obtained of the disposition of the people. For this purpose it was calculated that some ten million yen, I may say five million dollars, was yearly needed for the pacification and government of Formosa."

Deaths in battle and illness plagued the Japanese forces and resulted in heavy losses.

By 1902, most of the Formosan guerrilla units had either been killed or surrendered, but a Hakka guerrilla band led by the Hakka Lin Shao-mao continued to challenge the Japanese occupation forces. Lin continued to harass the Japanese, and he and his men were eventually hunted down and killed in a major engagement on 30 May 1902. In Japanese eyes, the extermination of Lin's band marked the end of the 'pacification' process in Taiwan, though low-level violence continued for several years thereafter.

== Cultural Influence ==
- The 1895 war between the Japanese and the Formosan resistance movement was portrayed in a Hakka-language film called 1895, released in November 2008.

== See also ==
- Taiwanese resistance to Japanese colonialism
