= Mount Davidson (Alberta) =

Mountain in Alberta, Canada

- Location within Alberta Location within Canada

Highest point
- Elevation: 2,919 m (9,577 ft)
- Prominence: 299 m (981 ft)
- Listing: Mountains of Alberta
- Coordinates: 51°24′22″N 115°20′24″W

Geography
- Country: Canada
- Province: Alberta
- Protected area: Don Getty Wildland Provincial Park
- Parent range: Front Ranges
- Topo map: NTS 82O6 Lake Minnewanka

Climbing
- First ascent: 1988 Frank Campbell and Karl Nagy

Mount Davidson is a 2,919-metre (9,577-foot) mountain summit located to the north of the head of Waiparous Creek, Municipal District of Bighorn No. 8, southwestern Alberta, Canada. Visible from Calgary, it is situated 18 km (11 mi) north of Lake Minnewanka. The first ascent of the mountain was made in October 1988 by Frank Campbell and Karl Nagy.

Mount Davidson is named after James Wheeler Davidson (1872 – 1933).

== See also ==
- Geography of Alberta
- Geology of Alberta
