= Japanese cruiser Yaeyama =

Aviso of the Imperial Japanese Navy

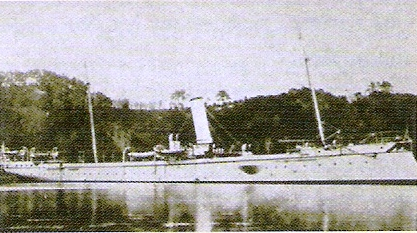
- Yaeyama in the 1880s

History

Empire of Japan
- Name: Yaeyama
- Ordered: 1885 Fiscal Year
- Builder: Yokosuka Shipyards, Japan
- Laid down: June 1887
- Launched: March 1889
- Completed: 15 March 1890
- Fate: Scrapped 1 April 1911

General characteristics
- Type: Unprotected cruiser
- Displacement: 1,584 long tons (1,609 t)
- Length: 96.9 m (317 ft 11 in) w/l
- Beam: 10.5 m (34 ft 5 in)
- Draught: 4 m (13 ft 1 in)
- Propulsion: 2-shaft, 6 boilers (8 after 1902), 5,630 hp (4,200 kW)
- Speed: 20.75 knots (23.88 mph; 38.43 km/h)
- Range: 5000 nm @ 10 knots
- Capacity: 350 tons coal
- Complement: 200
- Armament: 3 × QF 4.7 inch Guns; 8 × QF 3 pounder Hotchkiss guns; 2 × 457 mm (18 in) torpedo tubes

Yaeyama (八重山) was an unprotected cruiser of the Imperial Japanese Navy. The name Yaeyama comes from the Yaeyama Islands, the southernmost of the three island groups making up current Okinawa prefecture. Yaeyama was used by the Imperial Japanese Navy primarily as an aviso (dispatch boat) for scouting, reconnaissance and delivery of high priority messages.

== Background ==
Yaeyama was designed under the supervision of French military advisor Emile Bertin, and built in Japan by the Yokosuka Naval Arsenal. Her engine, a three-cylinder triple-expansion steam engine supplied a pair of six cylindrical boilers was imported from Hawthorn Leslie and Company in England. With a small displacement, powerful engines, and a 20.75-knot (38.43 km/h) speed, the heavily armed and lightly armored Yaeyama was an example of the Jeune Ecole philosophy of naval warfare advocated by Bertin. Due to its small size it is sometimes classified as a corvette or gunboat.

== Design ==
Yaeyama was the second domestically-produced steel-hulled vessel in Japan. It retained two masts for auxiliary sail propulsion in addition to her steam engine. Yaeyama was armed with three QF 4.7 inch guns and eight QF 3-pounder Hotchkiss guns. In addition, she carried two torpedoes, mounted on the deck.

== Service record ==
Yaeyama was active in the First Sino-Japanese War, protecting troop transports to Korea, and covering the landing of Japanese forces at Port Arthur. She was present at the opening Battle of Pungdo, where she assisted in the rescue of the European crew of the steamer "Kowshing" after it was sunk by the cruiser Naniwa. She was subsequently involved in patrols of the Yellow Sea. During the Battle of Weihaiwei, Yaeyama covered Japanese landing operations on 18 January 1895 (along with Atago and Maya) and shelled Chinese forts. Subsequently, Yaeyama took part in the invasion of Taiwan, and saw action on 13 October 1895 at the bombardment of the Chinese coastal forts at Takow (Kaohsiung) and the Invasion of the Pescadores.

While operating in support of the invasion of Taiwan, Yaeyama precipitated a diplomatic incident with the United Kingdom when her captain intercepted the British-flagged merchant ship SS Thales in international waters on the morning of 21 October 1895. Thales had departed Taiwan the previous day with 800 passengers en route to Amoy, including Liu Yongfu, the provisional second president of the Republic of Formosa and leader of the military resistance against the Japanese invasion. Suspecting that Liu was on board, Yaeyama set off in pursuit, ordering the vessel to stop just short of Amoy and sending over a boarding party. The boarding party was unable to locate Liu (who had disguised himself as a coolie), but attempted to detain seven other Chinese passengers suspected of being part of the Formosa government. The captain of the Thales refused to surrender the passengers, and after a tense ten-hour standoff, Yaeyama's captain Commander Hirayama Tojirō agreed to allow Thales to proceed to Amoy. Liu thus escaped capture; however, the search of a neutral vessel in international waters provoked a diplomatic protest from the United Kingdom and resulted in an official apology by the Japanese government, the transfer of Commander Hirayama to the reserves, and the sacking of Japanese admiral Arichi Shinanojō. After the war, Yaeyama was transferred to the reserve fleet.

Yaeyama was recalled to duty to assist in escorting transports supporting Japanese naval landing forces which occupied the port city of Tianjin in northern China during the Boxer Rebellion of 1900, as part of the Japanese contribution to the Eight-Nation Alliance.

On 11 May 1902, Yaeyama ran aground during a storm in Nemuro Bay, Hokkaido together with the corvette Musashi and could not be refloated until 1 September of that year. She remained at Yokosuka Naval Arsenal for repairs until June 1903. During this time, her locomotive-type cylindrical boilers were replaced with eight Niclausse boilers, and a second smoke stack was added, albeit without noticeable improvement in her performance.

During the Russo-Japanese War of 1904–1905, Yaeyama participated in the naval Battle of Port Arthur and subsequent blockade of that port. Despite her small size and obsolescence, she was also present at the Battle of the Yellow Sea and the final decisive Battle of Tsushima, as well as the Japanese invasion of Sakhalin, where her high speed made her useful to carrying sensitive orders and messages between ships and from ship to shore.

After the war, she was used as a test ship for new boiler technologies.

The advent of wireless communication made the use of dispatch vessels obsolete, and Yaeyama was scrapped on 1 April 1911.
