= Fangliao =

Rural township in Pingtung County, Taiwan

Coordinates: 22°21′56.2″N 120°35′36.9″E

Fangliao Township 枋寮鄉
- Rural township
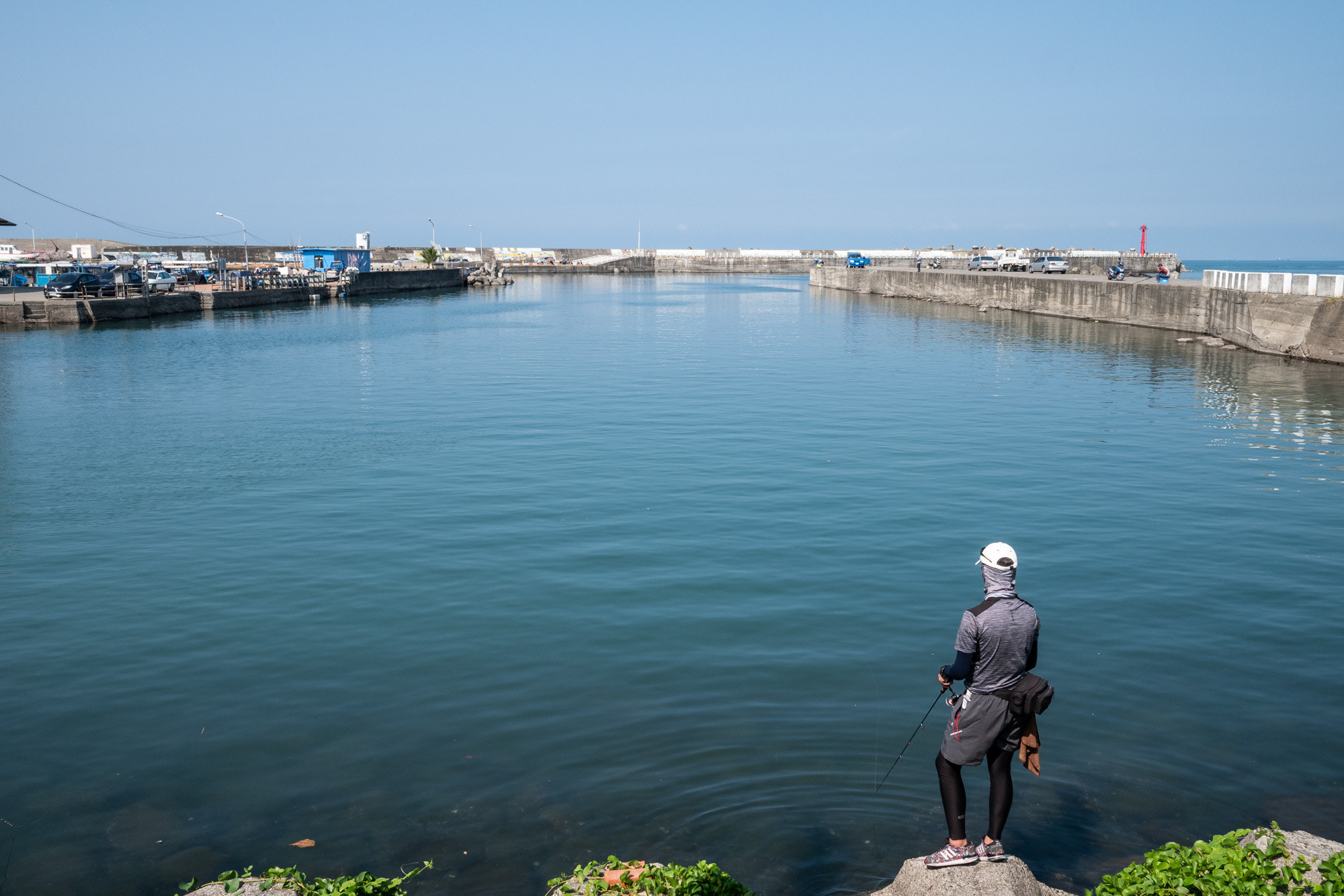
- Harbor in Fangliao Township

- Fangliao Township in Pingtung County
- Location: Pingtung County, Taiwan

Area
  - Total: 58 km^{2} (22 sq mi)

Population (February 2024)
  - Total: 22,717
  - Density: 390/km^{2} (1,000/sq mi)

Fangliao Township
- Traditional Chinese: 枋寮鄉
- Literal meaning: sandalwood hut township
- Hanyu Pinyin: Fāngliáo Xiāng
- Wade–Giles: Fang^{1}-liao^{23} Hsiang^{1}
- Pha̍k-fa-sṳ: Piông-liàu-hiông
- Hokkien POJ: Pang-liâu-hiong

Fangliao Township is a rural township in Pingtung County, Taiwan.

== History ==
In 1867, the village of Pangliau was located at the shore of a bay. American consul Charles Le Gendre, reporting on his 1867 visit to southern Formosa (see Formosa Expedition), wrote: "The products are rice and peanuts. Women pound the rice and till the fields, while the men are entirely taken up with fishing." The high mountains to the east were the "exclusive domain of the savage aborigines, who receive from the Chinese (or half-caste) population a certain share of their crops".

In 1875, Imperial commissioner Shen Baozhen, who had been charged with making arrangements to prevent the Japanese from occupying Chinese districts, began introducing reforms in government. Pangliau was incorporated into Hengchun District, which was created from the portion of Fongshan District south of a river slightly north of Pangliau.

Pangliau, 25 miles (40 km) south of Takow (Kaohsiung), was the site where Japanese forces landed and completed the encirclement of Tainan during the 1895 Japanese invasion of Taiwan.

== Geography ==
- Area: 57.73 square kilometres (22.29 sq mi)
- Population: 22,717 (February 2024)

=== Climate ===
Fangliao has a tropical savanna climate, with warm to hot weather year-round, precipitation mainly occur during the wet season from May to September, typical of the rest of the Pingtung Plain.

Climate data for Fangliao Township
| Month | Jan | Feb | Mar | Apr | May | Jun | Jul | Aug | Sep | Oct | Nov | Dec | Year |
|---|---|---|---|---|---|---|---|---|---|---|---|---|---|
| Mean daily maximum °C (°F) | 24.6 (76.3) | 25.7 (78.3) | 27.6 (81.7) | 29.7 (85.5) | 31.2 (88.2) | 31.7 (89.1) | 32.2 (90.0) | 31.9 (89.4) | 31.3 (88.3) | 30.0 (86.0) | 27.9 (82.2) | 25.3 (77.5) | 29.1 (84.4) |
| Daily mean °C (°F) | 20.2 (68.4) | 21.0 (69.8) | 23.1 (73.6) | 25.5 (77.9) | 27.4 (81.3) | 28.4 (83.1) | 28.8 (83.8) | 28.5 (83.3) | 27.8 (82.0) | 26.5 (79.7) | 24.2 (75.6) | 21.2 (70.2) | 25.2 (77.4) |
| Mean daily minimum °C (°F) | 16.8 (62.2) | 17.5 (63.5) | 19.7 (67.5) | 22.6 (72.7) | 24.7 (76.5) | 25.9 (78.6) | 26.3 (79.3) | 26.0 (78.8) | 25.4 (77.7) | 23.9 (75.0) | 21.6 (70.9) | 17.9 (64.2) | 22.4 (72.2) |
Source: Central Weather Bureau

== Administrative divisions ==
The township comprises 15 villages: Anle, Baosheng, Dazhuang, Deli, Fangliao, Longshan, Neiliao, Renhe, Taiyuan, Tianshi, Tunghai, Xinkai, Xinlong, Yuquan and Zhongliao.

== Transportation ==
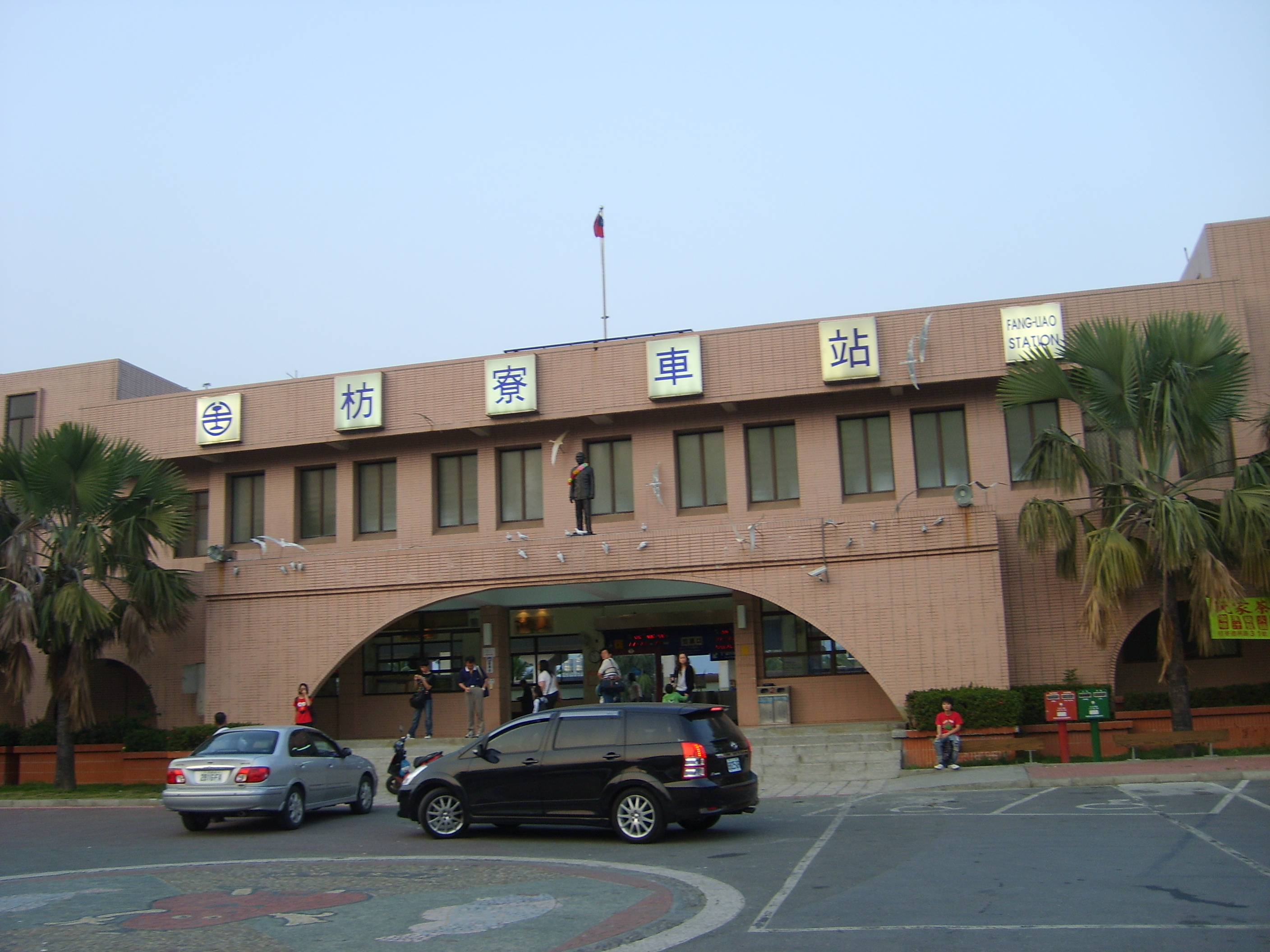
TRA Fangliao Station

The township is served by Fangliao Station and Donghai Station of Taiwan Railway.

== Popular culture ==
It was also the location for the filming of the second season of the American show Wipeout.

== Bibliography ==
- Davidson, James W. (1903). The Island of Formosa, Past and Present : history, people, resources, and commercial prospects : tea, camphor, sugar, gold, coal, sulphur, economical plants, and other productions. London and New York: Macmillan. OCLC 1887893. OL 6931635M.
