= Japanese warship Fujiyama =

Japanese steam frigate

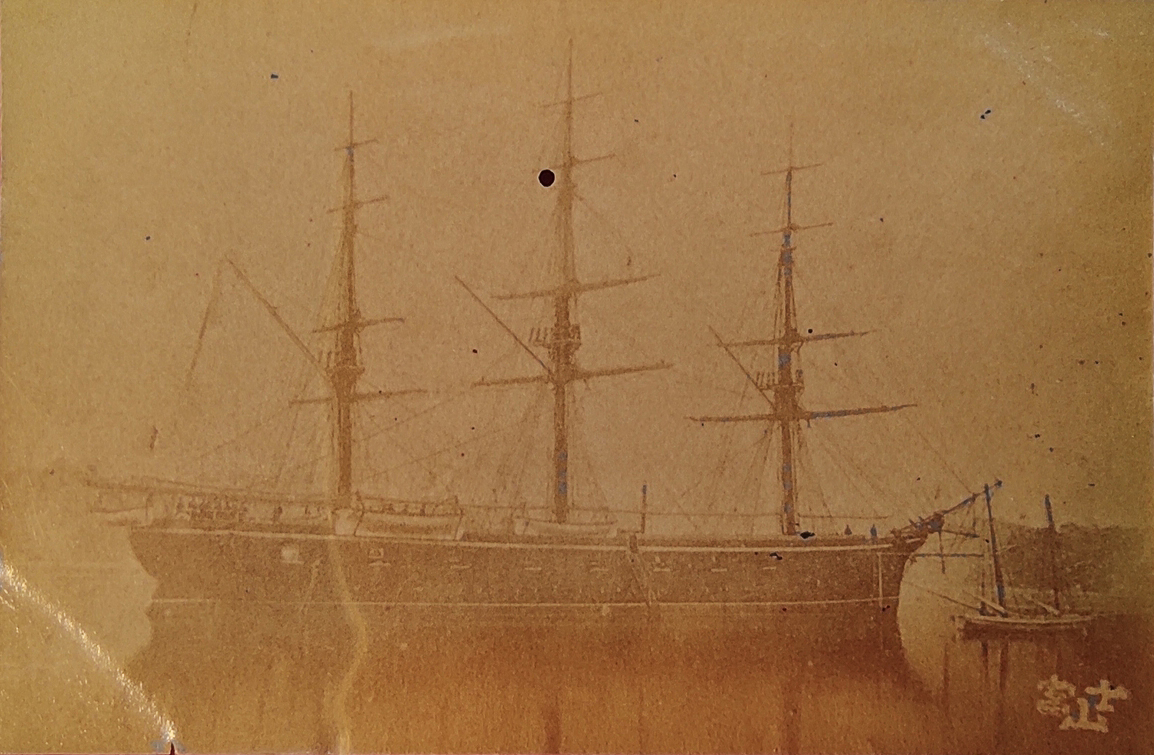
- The Fujisan (Japanese:富士山).

History

Japan
- Name: Fujiyama
- Namesake: Mount Fuji
- Ordered: 1862
- Launched: 1864
- Acquired: 7 December 1866 (by Tokugawa Navy)
- Commissioned: 28 April 1869 (by IJN)
- Decommissioned: 10 May 1889
- Fate: Sold for scrap, August 1896

General characteristics
- Type: Steam frigate
- Displacement: 1,000 long tons (1,016 t)
- Length: 63 m (206 ft 8 in) w/l
- Beam: 10.3 m (33 ft 10 in)
- Draft: 3.27 m (10 ft 9 in)
- Propulsion: 350 hp (261 kW) steam engine
- Speed: 13 knots (24 km/h; 15 mph)
- Complement: 134
- Armament: 1 × 6.3 in (160 mm) muzzle-loading cannon; 2 × 5.9 in (150 mm) muzzle-loading cannons; 10 × small guns

Fujiyama (富士山) was a Japanese steam frigate acquired by the Tokugawa shogunate during the Bakumatsu period immediately prior to the Meiji Restoration. She was built in New York City, United States, in 1864.

== Service record ==
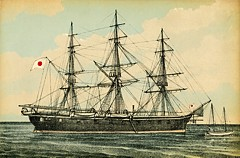
Warship Fujiyama

Ordered in 1862 as part of an arms package consisting of two steam frigates and one gunboat to the United States government, work on Fujiyama was delayed by issues with American neutrality during the Battles for Shimonoseki. The Tokugawa shogunate cancelled the contract for the remaining vessels, but Fujiyama was already under construction. She was received by the Shogunate on 7 December 1866 at Yokohama.

Fujiyama was one of the four ships remitted by Enomoto Takeaki to the Imperial forces during the Boshin War, before Enomoto fled to Hokkaidō, suggesting that her performance was not so impressive.

After the Meiji restoration, Fujiyama was incorporated in the newly formed Imperial Japanese Navy in July 1869. She was rated as a 4th class warship (四等艦) on November 15, 1871, and a third-class warship on November 20, 1874. She was thereafter only used as a training ship, until her decommission on May 10, 1889. She was subsequently used as a floating barracks at Kure Naval District for a few months in 1889. She was sold for scrap in 1896.
