= James W. Davidson =

American journalist

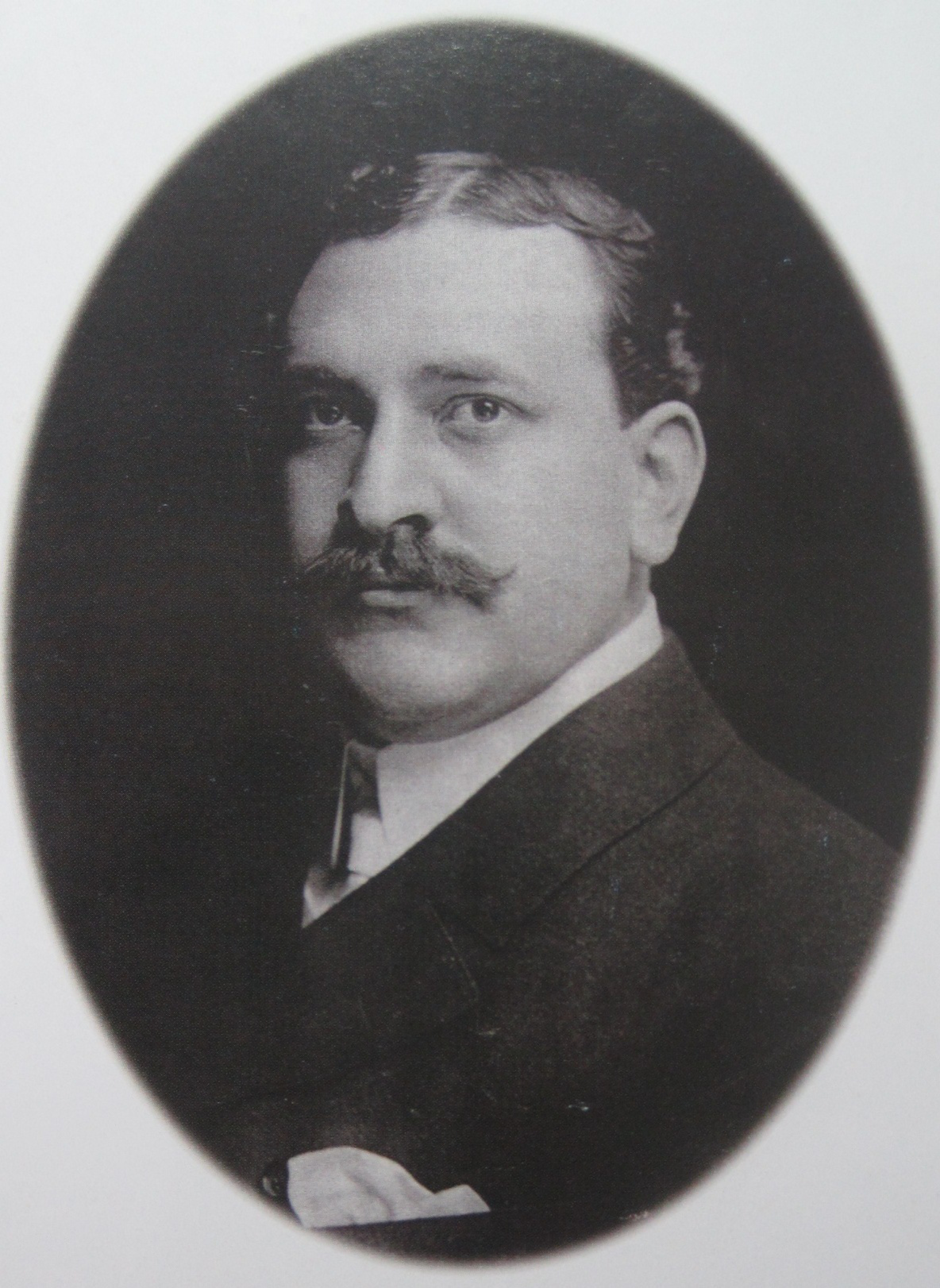
- Born: June 14, 1872; Austin, Minnesota, USA
- Died: July 18, 1933 (aged 61); Calgary, Alberta, Canada
- Occupations: Businessman, diplomat, explorer, journalist, philanthropist
- Known for: The Island of Formosa, Past and Present; Contributions to Rotary International
- Title: US Consul to Formosa
- Term: (1898–1904)
- Spouse: Lillian Dow Davidson

James Wheeler Davidson (14 June 1872 – 18 July 1933) was an American-born Canadian businessman, diplomat, explorer, journalist, and philanthropist. He is remembered for writing The Island of Formosa, Past and Present (1903), a book on the history of Taiwan. He is also noted for greatly aiding the internationalisation of Rotary International.

== Adventure and journalism ==
In 1893 Davidson was a member of the Peary expedition to Greenland, which was attempting to find a route to the North Pole. In 1895 he travelled to Taiwan as a war correspondent to report on the transition from Qing rule to Japanese rule, and witnessed the resistance to the Japanese takeover which centred on the short-lived Republic of Formosa. He was decorated by the Emperor of Japan in 1895 with Order of Rising Sun for services rendered to the Japanese army in capturing the capital of Formosa. Once the Japanese established control over the island, he took up a job as a trader based in the town of Tamsui. In June 1897, he was appointed by President Cleveland consular agent for the island of Formosa, where he remained nine years, during which time he wrote numerous monographs on Formosan affairs.

Disappointed by the lack of a comprehensive general history of the island in English, Davidson undertook eight years of research on the subject, poring through accounts in many languages until he was able to write his magnum opus in 1903, which he called The Island of Formosa, Past and Present. The book has gone through several reprints, and remains a central work in the study of the history of Taiwan, with one commentator describing it as "the major English language survey of Taiwan for its days and still the most frequently consulted English language source".

In 1903, he obtained leave of absence, and under the auspices of the Russian Communications Department made a careful survey of the territory adjacent to the Asian section of the Trans-Siberian Railway, collecting material for a complete report of this territory, extracts from which appeared in the Century Magazine (April–June 1903).

== Diplomatic career, emigration to Canada, Rotary International ==
In 1904, Davidson was appointed to Dalny, Manchuria, one of the political consulates, where he was expected to promote Secretary Hay's "open door" policy. Later he became consul at Andong, Manchuria, and commercial attaché to the American legation, Peking, and special agent of the Department of State. He was appointed by President Roosevelt in 1905 consul general at Shanghai. He also served in Nanjing.

Invalided out of the service in 1905, he returned to the United States to convalesce, subsequently emigrating to Canada once he had recovered. Once there he became involved in the lumber business, making his fortune and becoming a pillar of the local community. Davidson was an enthusiastic member of the Rotary club in Calgary, and when the organisation wanted to extend its reach throughout the Mediterranean, Middle East, Southeast Asia and Australasia, he was the logical choice as envoy to the region because of his prior international experience. Leaving for chartering trips in 1921 and from 1928–31, he spent CAN$255,000 of his own money to establish branches of Rotary International in Australia, New Zealand, Greece, Egypt, Jerusalem, Burma, Siam (Thailand), Java, and in several of the Malay states including Seremban, Kuala Lumpur, Malacca, Penang, Ipoh, Klang and Singapore. In total his trip lasted two and one-half years, and he was responsible for founding over twenty branches of the organisation around the world.

He was a fellow of the Royal Geographical Society and member of the Asiatic Society, the Explorers Club, the Peary Arctic Club and the Authors' Club. In 1915, he was president of eight banks in North Dakota.

Davidson died in Vancouver in his adopted homeland of Canada on 18 June 1933. Mount Davidson (Alberta) was named after him.

== Bibliography ==
- Davidson, James W. (1895). Formosa Camphor and Its Future.
- Davidson, James W. (1895). "A Review of the History of Formosa, and a Sketch of the Life of Koxinga, the First King of Formosa". Transactions of the Asiatic Society of Japan. 24: 112–136.
- Davidson, James W. (1903). Formosa under Japanese rule. London: Japan Society. OCLC 860694076.
- Davidson, James W. (1903). The Island of Formosa, Past and Present : history, people, resources, and commercial prospects : tea, camphor, sugar, gold, coal, sulphur, economical plants, and other productions. London and New York: Macmillan. OCLC 1887893. OL 6931635M.
- Davidson, James W. (1903). The Island of Formosa : historical view from 1430 to 1900, history, people, resources and commercial prospects, tea, camphor, sugar, gold, coal, sulphur, economical plants and other productions. hdl:2027/njp.32101073011411. OCLC 780197423.
- Davidson, James W. (2005) [1903]. The Island of Formosa, Past and Present : history, people, resources, and commercial prospects : tea, camphor, sugar, gold, coal, sulphur, economical plants, and other productions. Taipei, Taiwan: Southern Materials Center. ISBN 957-638-124-X. OCLC 155703226.
