= John McClure (admiral) =

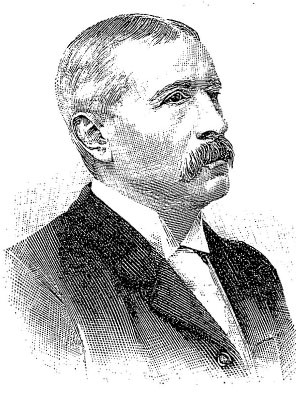
- Born: 13 November 1837; Kirkcudbright, Scotland, United Kingdom
- Died: 18 January 1920 (aged 82); Garlieston, Dumfries & Galloway, Scotland
- Burial place: Kirkcudbright, Scotland
- Military career
- Allegiance: Qing dynasty
- Service years: 1894-1895
- Rank: Vice Admiral
- Conflicts: First Sino-Japanese War

Admiral John McClure (13 November 1837 – 18 January 1920) was a Scotsman serving in the Imperial Chinese Navy who, following the suicide of Admirals Ding Ruchang and Liu Buchan, took command of the Beiyang Fleet during the Battle of Weihaiwei and surrendered it to the Japanese.

== Biography ==
McClure was born the son of John and Margaret McClure. His father was the architect on the Earl of Galloway's estates in Wigtownshire and at the time of John's birth was supervising the building of the parish church in Kirkcudbright.

=== Career in China ===
After an education at nearby Sorbie he joined the Merchant Marine. He was employed by the Taku Tug & Lighter Company, as a sailor based in Tianjin, China, and later for many years was a ship's captain for Hong Kong-based Jardine, Mattheson, and Co. and so knew the coasts of China well.

Before the start of the First Sino-Japanese War he had been the Master of the merchant vessel Kow Shing, which had built in 1883 in Barrow-in-Furness in England and which flew under the British flag. He had returned to England for the acceptance of his vessel and had sailed her back to China. The Kow Shing was sunk by a squadron of the Imperial Japanese Navy in the Battle of Pungdo, marking the start of hostilities between the Empire of Japan and Empire of China; however, McClure was no longer in command of the Kow Shing by July 1894. He had been appointed to command the Chinese dispatch boat Pei-Ho and was carrying dispatches between Port Arthur, Chemulpoo and other Chinese ports.

By mid-November 1894 McClure had been appointed "Assistant Admiral of the Beiyang Fleet". As well as being made an Admiral by the Chinese he was also appointed a Mandarin of the highest class

Admiral Ding Ruchang committed suicide after the retreat of the Beiyang Fleet from the Battle of the Yalu River (1894) into the naval base of Weihaiwei. Along with Ding Ruchang several other senior Chinese officers committed suicide on 12–13 February 1895 after their failure to stop the Japanese at the Battle of Weihaiwei. Ding Ruchang had started surrender negotiations with the Japanese commander on 12 February but after the suicides of all the senior Chinese staff command of the Beiyang Fleet fell to McClure who wrote a letter of surrender in Admiral Ding's name, and had it translated into Chinese and transmitted to the Japanese on the morning of 12 February. Per the terms of the letter, the remaining ships, forts and stores were surrendered to the Japanese. McClure requested that all Chinese troops, civilians and the foreign military advisors be allowed to depart unmolested, and suggested that the British China squadron oversee compliance with the surrender agreement. Admiral Itō Sukeyuki of the Imperial Japanese Navy, despite the reservations of some members of his staff, agreed to all terms. McClure was taken to Japan as a prisoner of war after the surrender, and from there was repatriated to the United Kingdom, and subsequently settled in Kirkcudbright.

== After 1895 ==
McClure died at his home "Seaview", Garlieston, Dumfries & Galloway, Scotland on 18 January 1920 after a long illness. He was aged 82.

He had only moved to Garlieston in the last two years of his life so he was buried in the town he was born in and lived in when he returned from China. He is buried in St Cuthbert's Old Churchyard, Kirkcudbright.

His grave is inscribed:

Admiral John McClure
Imp Chinese Navy
who died at Seaview, Garlieston
18 January 1920
in his 83rd year
