= Japanese cruiser Naniwa =

Lead ship of the Naniwa class of Japanese cruisers

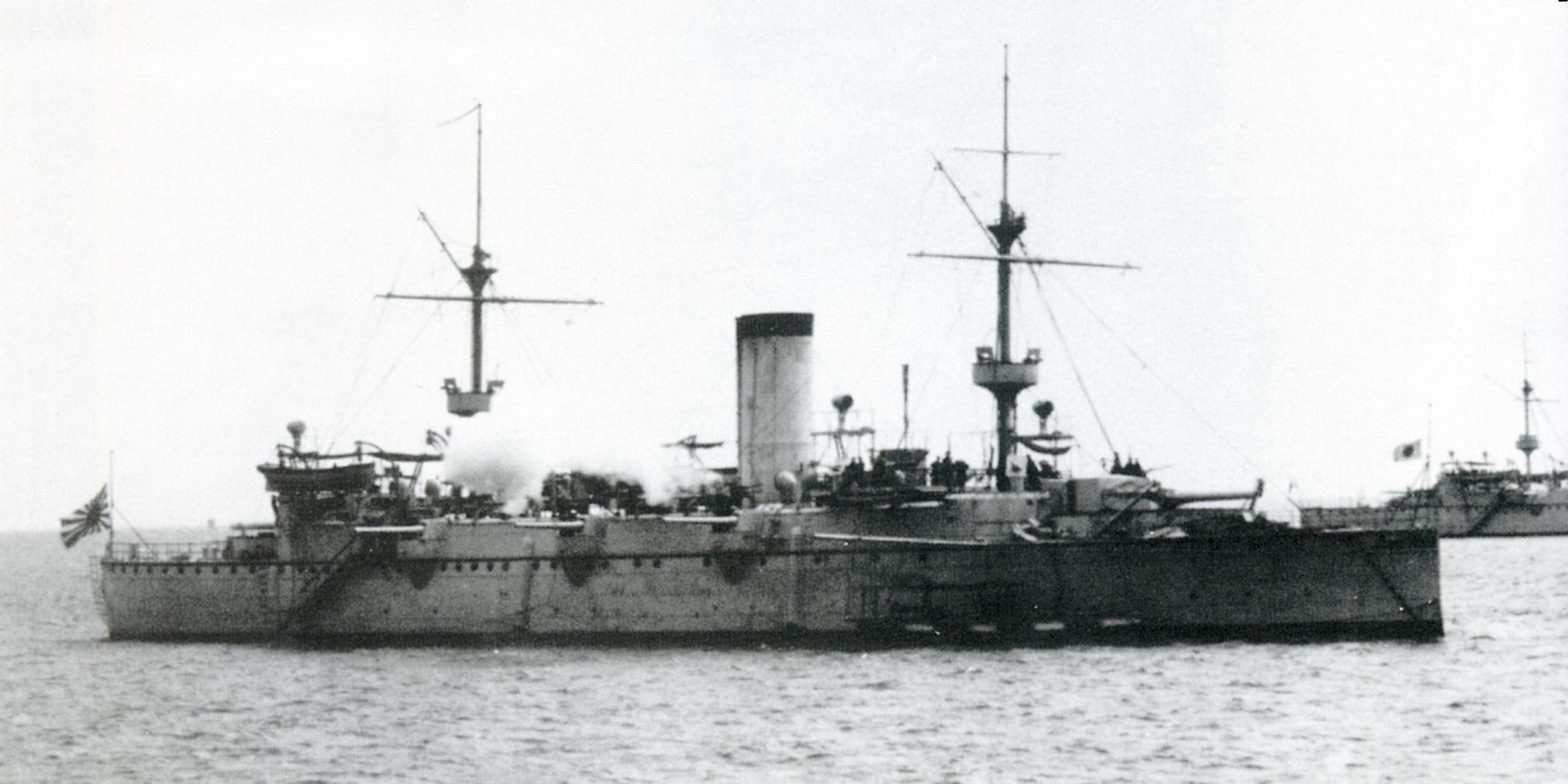
- Naniwa in 1887

History

Empire of Japan
- Name: Naniwa
- Namesake: Naniwa (an old name for the area of Osaka)
- Ordered: 1883 Fiscal Year
- Builder: Armstrong Mitchell, South Tyneside
- Laid down: 27 March 1884
- Launched: 18 March 1885
- Completed: 15 February 1886
- Stricken: 5 August 1912
- Fate: Wrecked, 26 June 1912, and sold for scrap, 26 June 1913

General characteristics (as built)
- Class & type: Naniwa-class protected cruiser
- Displacement: 3,727 long tons (3,787 t)
- Length: 320 ft (97.5 m) (o/a)
- Beam: 46 ft (14 m)
- Draught: 20 ft 3 in (6.2 m) (full load)
- Installed power: 6 cylindrical boilers; 7,500 ihp (5,593 kW)
- Propulsion: 2 shafts; 2 compound-expansion steam engines
- Speed: 18 knots (33 km/h; 21 mph)
- Range: 9,000 nmi (17,000 km; 10,000 mi) at 13 knots (24 km/h; 15 mph)
- Complement: 338
- Armament: 2 × single 26 cm (10.2 in) guns; 6 × single 15 cm (5.9 in) guns; 2 × single 6 pdr (57 mm (2.2 in)) guns; 10 × quadruple 1 in (25 mm) guns; 4 × 10-barrel 11 mm (0.43 in) guns; 4 × 14 in (356 mm) torpedo tubes
- Armour: Deck: 2–3 in (51–76 mm); Conning tower: 3 in (76 mm)

Naniwa (浪速) was the lead ship of her class of two protected cruisers built for the Imperial Japanese Navy (IJN) in the 1880s. As Japan lacked the industrial capacity to construct such vessels, the ship was designed and built in the United Kingdom. She participated in the First Sino-Japanese War of 1894–1895, playing a major role in the Battle of the Yalu River and lesser roles in the Battles of Port Arthur, Weihaiwei, the Pescadores Campaign and the invasion of Taiwan. Naniwa played a minor role in the Russo-Japanese War of 1904–1905 where she participated in the Battle of Chemulpo Bay, briefly helped to blockade Port Arthur at the beginning of the war, helped to sink a Russian armored cruiser during Battle off Ulsan and participated in the climactic defeat of the Imperial Russian Navy in the Battle of Tsushima.

After the war the ship was relegated to auxiliary roles and served as a survey and fisheries protection ship. Naniwa ran aground in the Kurile Islands north of the Japanese Home Islands in 1912 and could not be refloated before she was permanently wrecked a month later. Salvage rights to the wreck were sold a year later.

== Design and description ==
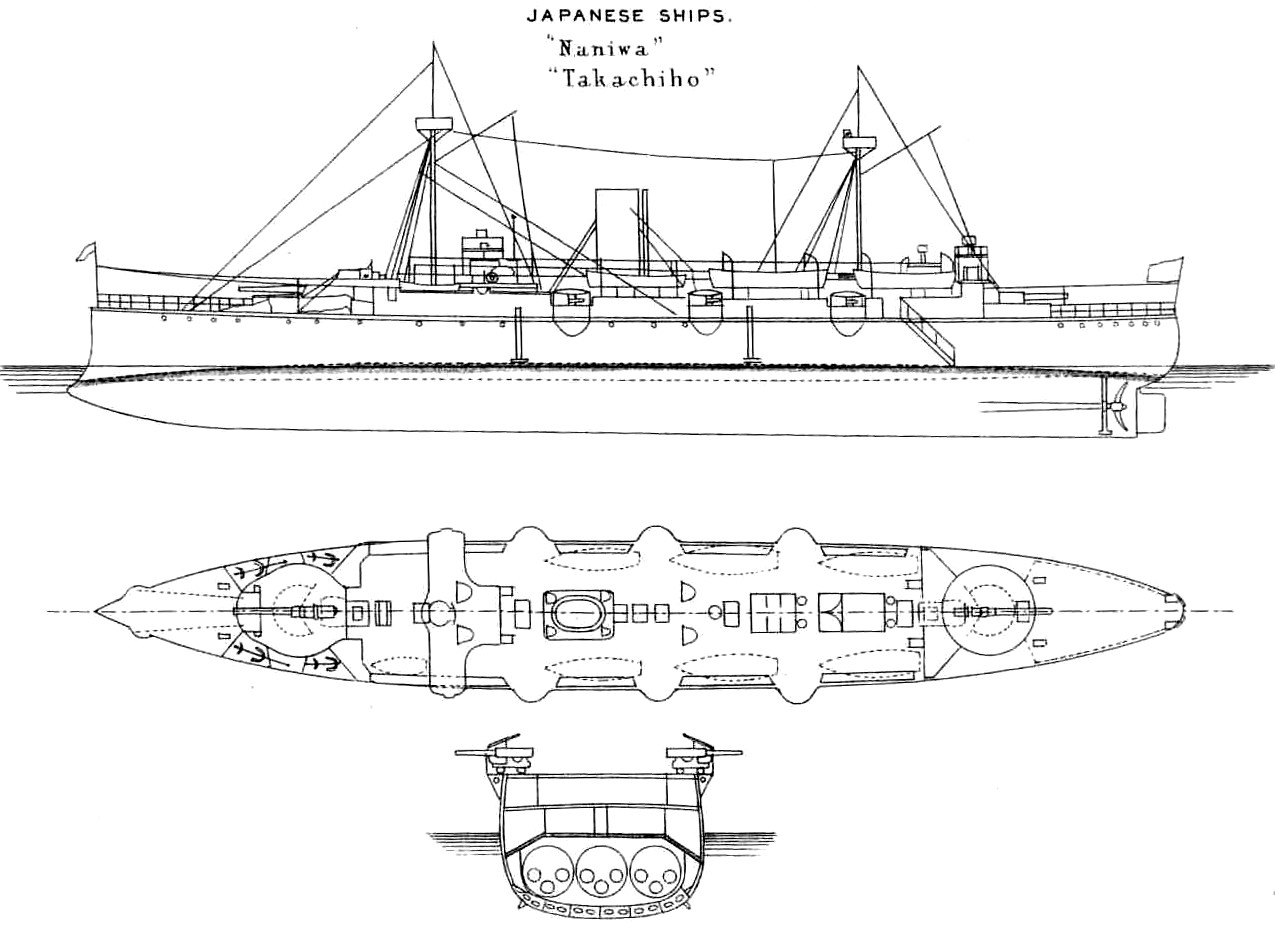
Left elevation and deck plan

The Naniwa-class cruisers were designed by Armstrong Mitchell's chief naval architect, William White, as improved versions of the pioneering Chilean protected cruiser Esmeralda (later purchased by the IJN and renamed Izumi) and the Royal Navy's equivalent Mersey-class ships. When completed, Naniwa and her sister ship, Takachiho, were considered the most advanced and most powerful cruisers in the world. The cruisers displaced 3,727 long tons (3,787 t) at normal load. The ships had a length between perpendiculars of 300 feet (91.4 m) and an overall length of 320 feet (97.5 m), a beam of 46 feet (14 m) and a draft of 20 feet 3 inches (6.2 m) at deep load. The cruisers were fitted with a plough-shaped naval ram of mild steel below the waterline and had a partial double bottom extending between the forward and aft magazines. They were powered by a pair of horizontal, two-cylinder double-expansion steam engines, each driving one shaft using steam produced by six cylindrical boilers. The engines were designed to produce a total of 7,500 indicated horsepower (5,600 kW) with forced draught to give the ships a maximum speed of 18 knots (33 km/h; 21 mph). During her speed trials, Naniwa reached a speed of 18.72 knots (34.67 km/h; 21.54 mph) from 7,235 ihp (5,395 kW). The Naniwa-class cruisers carried enough coal to gave them a range of about 9,000 nautical miles (17,000 km; 10,000 mi) at a speed of 13 knots (24 km/h; 15 mph). The ship's crew consisted of 338 officers and men.

The main armament of the Naniwa-class ships initially consisted of two single 26-centimeter (10.2 in) Krupp cannon on pivot mounts in barbettes fore and aft of the superstructure. Each barbette was fitted with a fixed loading station in its rear and the guns had to return to this position to reload. The secondary armament was initially six 15-centimeter (5.9 in) Krupp cannon on pivot mounts in semi-circular sponsons on the main deck, three guns on each broadside. All of these guns were protected against the weather by gun shields. Defense against torpedo boats was provided by two quick-firing (QF) 6-pounder (57-millimeter (2.2 in)) Nordenfelt guns on the forward bridge, ten quadruple 1-inch (25 mm) Nordenfelt guns positioned the length of the superstructure and four 10-barrel, 11-millimeter (0.43 in) Nordenfelt organ guns mounted in the fighting tops of the military masts. In addition, there were four 356-millimeter (14 in) above-water tubes in the hull for Schwartzkopff torpedoes, two on each broadside.

Naniwa's armament frequently changed over her career and the first such was the replacement of her slow-firing 15-centimeter guns with Armstrong's QF 6-inch (152 mm) guns in 1896 after the First Sino-Japanese War. At the same time four of the 1-inch Nordenfelt guns were replaced by four 3-pounders. The fighting tops and the 10-barrel organ guns were removed in 1898 and the main guns were replaced by a pair of Armstrong 6-inch guns in 1900. At the same time the 6-pounders and the remaining Nordenfelt guns were exchanged for more 3-pounders, giving the ship a total of ten 3-pounders and a pair of lighter Yamauchi QF 2.5-pounder (47-millimeter) guns.

The protection of the Esmeralda had been much criticized by the British Admiralty and White raised the height of the two-inch (51 mm) steel protective deck to a foot (30.5 centimeters) above the waterline. The three-inch (76 mm) sloped portion of the deck extended to a depth of four feet (1.2 m) below the waterline. Amidships, the highly-subdivided compartments formed by the sloped portion of the protective deck were filled with coal and the fore and aft areas were fitted with cofferdams to limit any flooding. The walls of the conning tower were three inches thick and the loading station was protected by two inches of steel armor.

== Construction and career ==
Naniwa was ordered from Armstrong Mitchell on 22 March 1884 as Japan lacked the ability to build the Naniwa-class ships itself. The ship was laid down at the company's Low Walker shipyard in Newcastle upon Tyne on 27 March as yard number 475 and launched on 18 March 1885. She was completed on 15 February 1886 and departed for Japan on 28 March with a Japanese crew under the command of Captain Itō Sukeyuki, the first warship purchased overseas to be brought to Japan with an entirely Japanese crew.

Naniwa arrived at Shinagawa, Tokyo, on 26 June and was assigned to the Standing Fleet in July as a second-class warship. The ship and her sister Takachiho hosted Emperor Meiji and his wife, Empress Shōken, on 26 November as the ships conducted torpedo-firing exercises. Naniwa transported Prime Minister Itō Hirobumi, the Army Minister, Major General Ōyama Iwao, the Navy Minister, Lieutenant General Saigō Jūdō, and the Justice Minister from Yokohama to Kobe on 1 December and then to Pusan, Kingdom of Korea, before returning to Yokohama on 13 December. In early 1887 the sisters transported the Emperor and Empress from Yokohama to Kyoto and back again and then participated in the fleet maneuvers from 22 August to 5 September. Two months later they circumnavigated the Home Islands together with four other ships. On 17 June 1888 Naniwa became the flagship of the Standing Fleet and the sisters cruised to Okinawa, Taiwan, Wonsan, Korea, and Chifu, China later that year. The cruiser hosted the Emperor as he observed the launching of the protected cruiser Takao in the Yokosuka Naval Arsenal on 15 October. By 1889, Naniwa was assigned to the Yokosuka Naval District. Together with her sister, she visited ports in the Russian Far East, Korea and China while also participating in fleet maneuvers in the last half of the year.

After taking part in the April 1890 Great Maneuvers with the Imperial Japanese Army, the cruiser was reviewed by the Emperor and then cruised off the eastern coast of Korea and visited Vladivostok in the Russian Far East during June and July. On 23 August Naniwa and Takachiho were reclassified as first-class warships. Naniwa spent the following year patrolling in home waters. On 2 February 1892, the sisters departed Shinagawa to cruise to Hong Kong before participating in the annual Great Maneuvers later that year. Naniwa steamed to Honolulu, Hawaii, in early 1893 to protect Japanese citizens and interests during the overthrow of the Hawaiian monarchy by American marines and colonists and returned home in May. The cruiser arrived back in Honolulu in December. Marines from Naniwa and the Royal Navy's cruiser HMS Champion were asked to land to defend their respective citizens during the "Black Week" hysteria of December 1893–January 1894, when the Provisional Government of Hawaii feared invasion by the United States to restore the legitimate government. During the confusion created by the revolution, a Japanese who had been convicted of murder escaped from prison in Honolulu, and sought refuge on Naniwa. Captain (later Fleet Admiral) Tōgō Heihachirō's refusal to hand the convict over to authorities from the Provisional Government nearly caused a diplomatic incident between Japan and the United States. Naniwa arrived back in Japan on 15 April and became the flagship of Rear Admiral Tsuboi Kōzō, commander of the First Flying Squadron, on 19 July.

=== First Sino-Japanese War ===
During the Donghak Peasant Revolution, advancing rebel forces caused the Korean government request assistance from Qing China in May 1894 who began shipping troops to Asan the following month. The Japanese government, unwilling to let Korea fall under Chinese control, began to ship troops of their own to Chemulpo (modern Incheon) that same month and occupied Chemelpo and Seoul, the Korean capital. The subsequent arrival of more Chinese troops at the mouth of the Taedong River on 16 July angered the Japanese who issued an ultimatum threatening war if any further troops arrived in Korea. The Viceroy of Zhili, Li Hongzhang, believed that the Japanese were bluffing and ordered 2,500 more troops to be transported to Asan. In response, the Japanese ordered the Combined Fleet to Kunsan, Korea, in preparation for war on the 23rd and forced King Gojong of Korea to renounce Korea's tributary relationship with China that day. Two ships carrying some of the soldiers arrived on the night of 23/24 July with the third and last contingent scheduled to arrive on the morning of 25 July.

After the Japanese ships arrived at Kunsan, Tsuboi's First Flying Squadron with Naniwa, and the protected cruisers Akitsushima and Yoshino, was detached from the Combined Fleet to rendezvous at Pungdo Island at the entrance to the Bay of Asan with the three Japanese warships from Chemulpo before blockading the west coast of Korea to prevent any reinforcements for Asan. The telegraph line to Chemulpo had been severed by the rebels and the Japanese ships there remained in port.

==== Battle of Pungdo ====
On the morning of 25 July, the protected cruiser Jiyuan and the torpedo gunboat Kwang-yi of the Imperial Chinese Beiyang Fleet sortied from Asan, possibly to rendezvous with the chartered British steamer, SS Kowshing, carrying the last of the Chinese troops. Jiyuan may have tried to pass too closely to Naniwa and Tōgō, fearing a torpedo attack, fired the first shots of the war. The Chinese cruiser was badly damaged, with her forward gun disabled, but managed to reach Weihaiwei (modern Weihai) despite being pursued by Yoshino. Naniwa and Akitsushima crippled the gunboat with heavy loss of life, which had to be beached to prevent her sinking.

At about 08:30 Jiyuan passed Kowshing, but the Chinese cruiser did not inform Kowshing of the battle and Kowshing's crew misidentified the cruiser as a Japanese vesel. Tōgō ordered the British ship to heave to at 09:15 and Captain Galsworthy complied. He also consented to a search of his ship. Tōgō declared the ship seized as it was ferrying Chinese troops and ordered the crew and passengers to abandon ship. The Chinese troops took control of the ship and refused to comply with his orders. An attempt to negotiate a peaceful settlement by a German officer in Chinese service failed and Tōgō opened fire at 13:10 for fear of Chinese reinforcements. A torpedo launched at a range of 160 yd (150 m) went underneath the steamer's keel, but Naniwa's guns did not, disabling the British ship's boiler room, possibly causing one boiler to explode, and hitting her below the waterline. This caused a panic aboard the Kowshing as the crew and passengers attempted to abandon ship. Naniwa's heavy guns continued to fire at the sinking ship, while her light guns targeted the swimmers in the water. After the steamer sank at 13:47, the Japanese launched boats in an attempt to rescue the ship's European crew, ignoring the Chinese in the water, but only found Galsworthy and two other Europeans. Naniwa was hit once early in the battle, but the shell failed to detonate and it inflicted neither damage nor casualties. The cruiser only fired 36 shells from its heavy guns during the battle and 1,331 rounds from its light guns.

Two days after the battle, Naniwa and the gunboat Maya returned to the wreck of the Kwang-yi to prevent any attempt to salvage the ship. The ship exploded when fired upon, probably as a result of the torpedo warheads detonating, which destroyed the gunboat. The IJN spent the next several weeks escorting troop convoys to Kunsan. On 9 August, Vice Admiral Itō, now commanding the Combined Fleet, took his ships to Weihaiwei, China, in search of the Beiyang Fleet and conducted a desultory bombardment of the port's coastal defenses when he did not find the Chinese ships. No damage was inflicted on either side and the Combined Fleet returned to Kunsan. For the rest of the month, the Flying Squadron escorted troop convoys to Kunsan. Itō sent Naniwa and Yoshino back to Weihahiwei on 14–15 September to find the Chinese ships, but they were unsuccessful, although their appearance convinced Admiral Ding Ruchang, commander of the Beiyang Fleet, that his ships were needed to defend the Chinese troop convoys to the mouth of the Yalu River. Their failure convinced Itō that the Beiyang Fleet was further north.

==== Battle of the Yalu River ====
The Flying Squadron led the rest of the Combined Fleet northwest on 16 September to investigate the anchorage at Haiyang Island. Finding it empty the following morning, Itō ordered his ships to head northeast and search the area around the Yalu River estuary. At 11:23 lookouts aboard Yoshino spotted the Chinese ships some 21.5 nmi (39.8 km; 24.7 mi) away. Knowing that his ships were faster than the Chinese ones, Itō intended to cross the T of the Beiyang Fleet and then concentrate his fire on the weakly protected ships of the Chinese right wing.

Ding's ships had been caught by surprise, but were able to weigh anchor and assume Ding's preferred line abreast formation while the Combined Fleet was still out of range. The Chinese ships opened fire at long range and were unable to hit any of the Japanese ships as they passed in front. The Flying Squadron's ships opened fire as the range closed to 3,000 yards (2,700 m) and soon set the unprotected cruisers Yangwei and Chaoyong on fire. The battle quickly devolved into a melee at close range, and the protected cruiser Zhiyuan and the armored cruiser Jingyuan were sunk as the Flying Squadron's ships concentrated on the Chinese cruisers. During the battle Naniwa was slightly damaged by nine hits that only wounded two men. She fired 33 shells from her main guns, 154 from her secondary armament and several thousand from her smaller guns.

==== Subsequent activities ====
Ding's surviving ships were able to disengage in the growing darkness and they steered to Port Arthur for repairs. Itō believed that the Chinese ships would head for Weihaiwei and briefly searched that area the following morning before returning to the Yalu where the wreck of the Yangwei was destroyed. The Combined Fleet then returned to Kunsan to recoal. Itō sent Naniwa and Akitsushima on a reconnaissance mission to Port Arthur (modern Lüshunkou) on 22 September and they were able to confirm that the Beiyang Fleet was present. The cruisers encountered the corvette Kwan Chia on their return voyage. It had been damaged during the Battle of the Yalu and beached to prevent it from sinking. As the Japanese ships approached the corvette was blown up by her own crew to prevent its capture.

After the battle, the Combined Fleet escorted troop convoys through the Korea Bay to Chinese territory at the base of the Liaodong Peninsula and supported the IJA's advance down the length of the peninsula towards Port Arthur. This allowed the Beiyang Fleet to sail from Port Arthur to Weihei in early November without being detected. Itō sent Takachiho and Yoshino to see if the Chinese ships were still at Port Arthur on 8 November and only located them at Weihaiwei a week later. The Combined Fleet cruised off the Chinese port on 16–17 November, but Ding was under orders to refuse battle, and the Japanese ships departed to begin the blockade of Port Arthur in support of the IJA's impending successful assault on the port.

The Japanese landed troops near Weihaiwei in January 1895 and gradually encircled the city. Itō was unwilling to commit his lightly armored ships to attacks on the formidable fortifications defending the port as he had to be prepared to defeat the Chinese ships if they attempted to break through the blockade. Successful night attacks by his torpedo boats in early February sank or damaged the larger ships and the morale of the Chinese crews continued to decline. Ding failed to make his own nocturnal torpedo attacks against the blockaders, but the Chinese torpedo boats sortied on the morning of 7 February and unsuccessfully attempted to escape by steaming west along the coast towards Zhifu. Pursued by the First Flying Squadron, all of them were either destroyed or captured. It is unclear whether Ding ordered them to breakout or if they deserted before the Chinese surrender on 12 February. Tōgō was promoted to rear admiral and became commander of the First Flying Squadron four days later and Captain Kataoka Shichirō replaced him as the captain of Naniwa.

The Japanese wanted to take the Pescadores Islands between the Chinese coast and Taiwan as a base from which to mount their invasion of Taiwan. Their expedition arrived there on 20 March and Naniwa and Yoshino scouted for a good landing site. The IJA's troops were scheduled to land on Wangan Island the following day, but that had to be delayed when Yoshino ran aground. Tōgō transferred his flag to Naniwa after the cruiser was refloated that evening. Bad weather delayed the landing until 23 March as Naniwa and the Flying Squadron bombarded the fort defending the island. The Chinese forces defending the islands surrendered or abandoned their positions and all of the islands were under Japanese control three days later. Preparations to conquer Taiwan took several months to organize and the IJA only made its first landing on the island on 1 June. Two days later, Naniwa and Takachiho were among the ships bombarding the forts defending the port of Keelung as the IJA successfully attacked it. On 7 June the sisters briefly blockaded the port of Tamsui near the island's capital of Taipei.

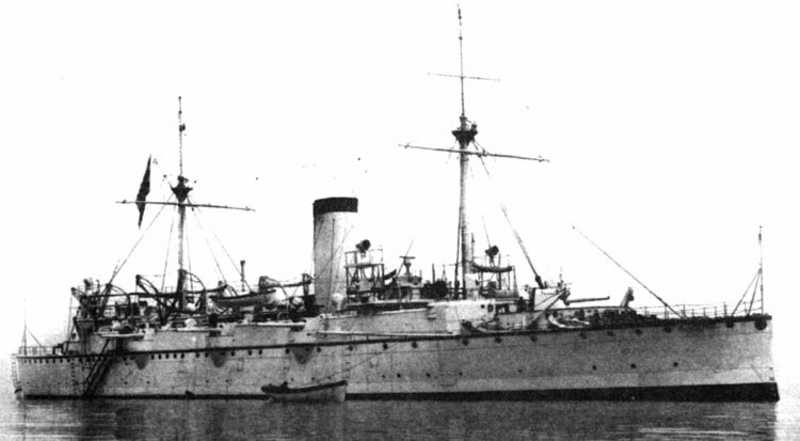
Naniwa in 1898

Naniwa returned to Japan on 20 October and was reduced to reserve on 10 November. She received a lengthy refit and modernization in 1896. The ship made a training cruiser to the new Republic of Hawaii from 20 April – 26 September 1897. Naniwa was reclassified as a second-class cruiser on 21 March 1898 and saluted Rear Admiral Prince Heinrich of Prussia, commander of the German East Asia Squadron on 29 June 1899 in Yokohama. During the Boxer Rebellion, the cruiser was being rearmed in early 1900 and then patrolled the Yellow Sea from December 1900 to May 1901.

=== Russo-Japanese War ===
On 28 December 1903, Naniwa and Takachiho were assigned to the Fourth Division of Vice Admiral Kamimura Hikonojō's Second Fleet. Vice Admiral Tōgō, commander of the Combined Fleet, intended that the Fourth Division, under the command of Rear Admiral Uryū Sotokichi aboard Naniwa, reinforced by the armored cruiser Asama, would escort troop ships to Chemulpo (modern Incheon) and destroy any Russian forces there to clear the way for the IJA units to land. The cruiser Chiyoda was present at Chemulpo monitoring the situation there and would coordinate with Uryū.

Chiyoda rendezvoused with Uryū's ships on the morning of 8 February and reported that the Russian protected cruiser Varyag and the elderly gunboat Korietz were anchored in the neutral port of Chemulpo, together with British, French, Italian and American warships. It was against the laws of war to attack enemy ships in a neutral ports, so Uryū decided to send his transports to unload their troops in the port as the Russians would be unlikely to initiate hostilities in neutral territory amidst the Western ships. Just in case, he ordered three of his cruisers to escort the troop ships into harbor with the two first cruisers to later rejoin the rest of the Fourth Division blockading the port. The following morning Uryū announced that a state of war existed between the Russian and Japanese Empires and the Russian commander decided to attempt to break through the blockade even though he was heavily outnumbered. His ships sortied later that morning and Naniwa was among the ships that badly damaged Varyag and forced the Russian ships to return to Chemulpo where Varyag was scuttled and Korietz was blown up later that afternoon.

After the battle, the Fourth Division was tasked to protect the Korean coast between Chemulpo and Asan and to cover the movement of IJA reinforcements through the former port. On 10 March the division ineffectually bombarded what the Japanese believed to be a naval mine control station on an island near Port Arthur. The following month, raids by the Russian cruisers based in Vladivostok under the command of Rear Admiral Karl Jessen caused Tōgō to task Kamimura with the defense of the Sea of Japan and the Tsushima Strait, for which task he was reinforced with the Fourth Division. At the end of April Kamimura took his ships to lay minefields off Vladivostok. Uryū attempted to intercept the Russian cruiser squadron after it sank three transports on 15 June, but could not locate them in stormy weather. During another raid by the Russians at the end of the month, Kamimura's ships spotted the enemy ships, but lost contact with them after nightfall.

==== Battle off Ulsan ====
The Russian Pacific Squadron was supposed to break through the Japanese blockade of Port Arthur and rendezvous with the Vladivostok cruiser squadron near the Strait of Tsushima on 10 August, but Admiral Wilgelm Vitgeft, commander of the Pacific Squadron, failed to coordinate with Jessen and the latter's ships were unprepared to immediately sortie when Jessen was surprised to receive a telegram from Port Arthur stating that Vitgeft's ships were at sea on the afternoon of 11 August. Jessen's ships were only able to depart late the following morning and were out of radio range before they could be told that the Pacific Squadron had been defeated and returned to port. Kamimura had kept the four armored cruisers of the 2nd Division together under his direct command and was patrolling the southern Part of the Sea of Japan when each side spotted the other around 05:00. Kamimura was between Jessen's ships and Vladivostok and he radioed nearby ships that he had the enemy in sight. Uryū's ships were deployed further south with Naniwa and Takachiho the closest.

Naniwa arrived around 06:00 and Takachiho an hour after that, but Uryū kept his lightly armored ships away from the more heavily armored Russian cruisers until Jessen had abandoned the badly damaged armored cruiser Rurik around 08:30. The sisters opened fire at 08:42 at a range of 7,100 yards (6,500 m) and continued until 10:05 when Uryū ordered them to cease fire after they had expended over 650 six-inch shells between them. The senior surviving Russian officer ordered Rurik scuttled shortly afterwards and the Japanese ships began rescuing survivors. Each of the sisters had been hit once during the battle and Naniwa's crew had lost two dead and four injured crewmen.

==== Battle of Tsushima ====
On 21 May 1905 Naniwa was still the flagship of Uryū's Fourth Division. Tōgō tasked the division with attacking the Russian cruisers and other smaller ships trailing the battleships once the battle began. Accordingly Uryū opened fire on the protected cruisers Oleg and Aurora and the elderly armored cruisers Vladimir Monomakh and Dmitrii Donskoi around 14:45 on 27 May at ranges between 6,600–7,100 yards (6,000–6,500 m) in poor visibility. About 17:00 Naniwa was struck by a large shell that caused some flooding which forced her out of formation to make repairs. She was able to rejoin the Fourth Division later that day and ceased firing at 18:50.

The following morning the Combined Fleet was widely dispersed with the Fourth Division trailing Tōgō's main body by 30 nmi (56 km; 35 mi). At 05:20 the Fifth Division, some 60 nmi (110 km; 69 mi) south of Tōgō, reported spotting the bulk of the Russian survivors and Uryū was ordered was ordered to maintain contact with them at 06:00, although he had just relayed the Fifth Division's report. The Fourth Division then turned east-southeast on what Uryū estimated to be an interception course. About an hour later, Uryū's ships encountered the crippled protected cruiser Svetlana and he detached his two weakest ships to deal with the cruiser. Shortly after 08:00 the Fourth Division, now consisting of Naniwa, Takachiho and Tsushima, found the main body of Rear Admiral Nikolai Nebogatov's Third Pacific Squadron of damaged and obsolete battleships and coast-defense ships. Uryū's ships kept their distance and Tōgō's battleships and armored cruisers opened fire about 10:15. Nebogatov surrendered less than two hours later. Uryū took the Fourth Division to search for more missing Russian ships around 17:00 and spotted Dmitrii Donskoi less than an hour later. The Russian ship attempted to disengage, but she was forced into battle when two more Japanese cruisers appeared ahead of her. The ship's captain then altered course and increased speed in an attempt to run her aground on the island of Ulleungdo, but the northern group of ships opened fire at about 19:00 and the Fourth Division joined them a half-hour later. Uryū's ships closed the range down to 4,400 yd (4,000 m) before he attempted to cut ahead of the armored cuiser to prevent her from reaching her destination before dark. As Naniwa made her turn around 20:00, she was struck by a six-inch shell from Dmitrii Donskoi that caused so much flooding that the ship had a 7° list several minutes later and was forced to disengage. Combined with the gathering darkness, the damage caused Uryū to withdraw and let the destroyers handle the fight as they were better suited to close-range action in the dark than his ships. Several days after the battle, Naniwa and Takachiho, together with the armored cruiser Tokiwa, were detached to monitor the internment of some Russian colliers that had entered Chinese ports before the battle. Uryū was relieved of command on 12 June and Naniwa steamed for home that same day. Two days later Tōgō reorganized the fleet and Rear Admiral Ogura had hoisted his flag aboard the cruiser.

=== Final years and loss ===
Naniwa was assigned to the Second Fleet in March–November 1906 and cruised off the coasts of China and Korea. The ship was transferred to the South China Fleet in May 1907 and was relieved of that assignment on 23 June 1908. The sisters participated in that year's Grand Maneuvers in October and Naniwa was reduced to reserve the following year. The cruiser served as a survey and fisheries protection ship in the North Pacific in March–October 1911. She resumed those duties on 1 April 1912, but struck a reef off the coast of Urup in the Kurile Islands at 46°30′N 150°10′E on 26 June. The ship broke up on 18 July and the wreck was stricken from the navy list on 5 August. It was sold for scrap on 26 June 1913.
