= Chinese ironclad Dingyuan =

Pre-dreadnought battleship

Coordinates: 37°30′1.68″N 122°10′48.57″E

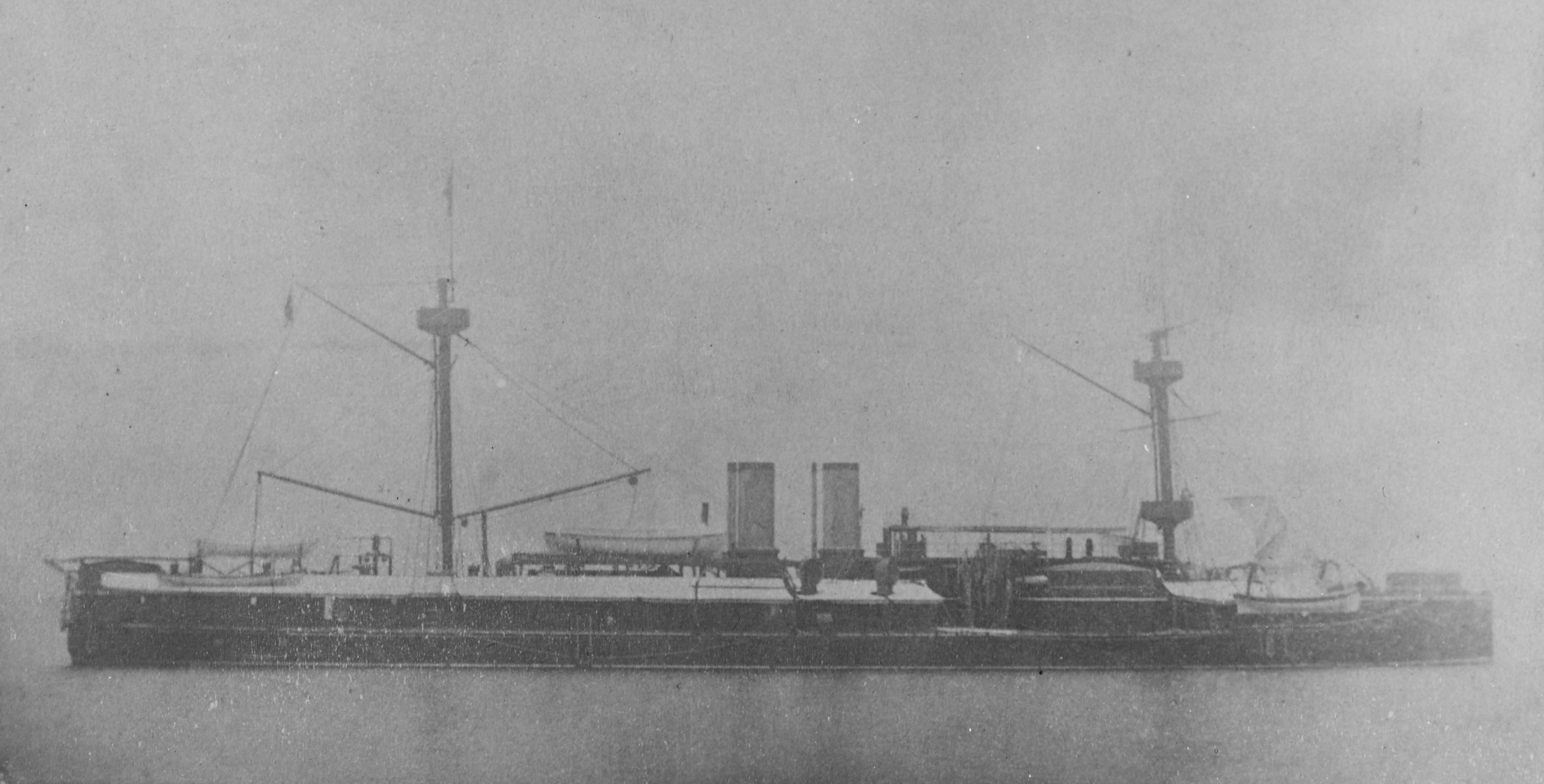
- Dingyuan early in her career

History

China
- Name: Dingyuan
- Ordered: 1880
- Builder: Stettiner AG Vulcan, Stettin, Germany
- Laid down: March 1881
- Launched: 28 December 1881
- Completed: May 1883
- Commissioned: November 1885
- Fate: Scuttled, 10 February 1895

General characteristics
- Class & type: Dingyuan-class ironclad
- Displacement: Normal: 7,220 long tons (7,340 t); Full load: 7,670 long tons (7,790 t)
- Length: 308 ft (94 m)
- Beam: 59 ft (18 m)
- Draft: 20 ft (6.1 m)
- Installed power: 8 fire-tube boilers; 7,200 ihp (5,400 kW)
- Propulsion: 2 compound steam engines; 2 × screw propellers
- Speed: 15.4 knots (28.5 km/h; 17.7 mph)
- Range: 4,500 nmi (8,300 km; 5,200 mi) at 10 knots (19 km/h; 12 mph)
- Complement: 350
- Armament: 4 × 305 mm (12 in) L/25 breech-loading guns; 2 × 5.9 in (150 mm) breech-loading guns; 2 × 47 mm (1.9 in) Hotchkiss revolver cannon; 6 × 37 mm (1.5 in) Maxim-Nordenfelt quick-firing guns; 3 × 14 in (356 mm) torpedo tubes
- Armor: Belt: 14 in; Deck: 3 in (76 mm); Barbettes: 12–14 in; Conning tower: 8 in (203 mm)

Dingyuan (simplified Chinese: 定远; traditional Chinese: 定遠; pinyin: Dìngyǔan; Wade–Giles: Ting Yuen or Ting Yuan, English: Everlasting Peace) was an ironclad battleship and the flagship of the Chinese Beiyang Fleet. She was the lead ship of the Dingyuan class, which included one other vessel, Zhenyuan, both of which were built in Germany in the early 1880s. Delivery of the two ironclads was delayed by the Sino-French War of 1884–1885. The ships were armed with a main battery of four 12 in (305 mm) guns in a pair of gun turrets, making them the most powerful warships in East Asian waters at the time.

Dingyuan served as the flagship of Admiral Ding Ruchang during her active career. In the 1880s and early 1890s, the Beiyang Fleet conducted a routine of training exercises and cruises abroad, with emphasis placed on visits to Japan to intimidate the country. The latter resulted in the Nagasaki Incident in 1886 and contributed to a rise in hostility between the two countries that culminated in the First Sino-Japanese War in 1894. She led the Chinese fleet during the Battle of the Yalu River on 17 September, where the Japanese Combined Fleet sank much of the Beiyang Fleet, though both Dingyuan and Zhenyuan survived despite numerous hits, thanks to their heavy armor. The survivors then retreated to Port Arthur for repairs, but after that city was threatened by the Japanese Army, fled to Weihaiwei.

As the Japanese continued to advance, they laid siege to Weihaiwei in late January 1895. On 5 February, a Japanese torpedo boat slipped into the port and hit Dingyuan with a torpedo, inflicting serious damage. The Chinese crew were forced to beach the vessel to avoid sinking, and for the next week, Dingyuan was used as a stationary artillery battery. Japanese ground forces seized the city's coastal fortifications on 9 February, allowing their artillery to shell the ships in the harbor, which prompted Ding to surrender. Dingyuan was scuttled in the harbor on 10 February. A full-scale replica of the ship was built in Weihai in 2003 as a museum ship and in 2019, the Chinese government announced that an underwater survey had located the original vessel's wreck.

== Design ==
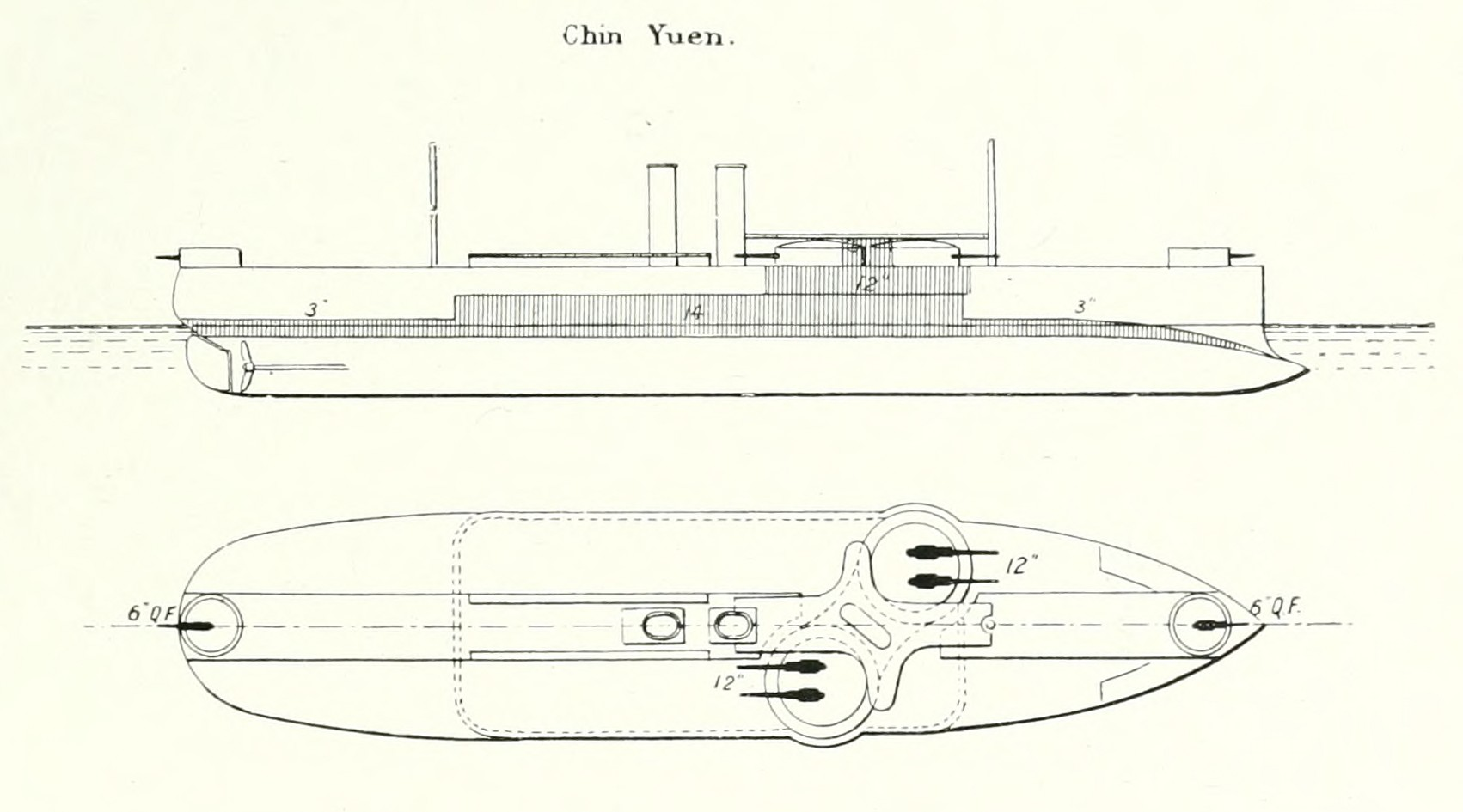
An overview of the layout of a Dingyuan-class ironclad

Following the direct intervention of the imperialist European powers in the mid-19th century, including the First and Second Opium Wars, where their superior steam-powered fleets overwhelmed the small Imperial Chinese Navy that still relied on traditional junks, the Chinese began a naval construction program in the 1880s to meet these threats more effectively. They enlisted British and German assistance, and two Dingyuan-class ironclads were ordered from Germany.

Dingyuan was 308 ft (94 m) long overall, with a beam of 59 ft (18 m) and a draft of 20 ft (6.1 m). She displaced 7,220 long tons (7,340 t) normally and up to 7,670 long tons (7,790 t) at full load. She was powered by a pair of compound steam engines that each drove a screw propeller. Steam was provided by eight coal-burning fire-tube boilers that were ducted into a pair of funnels amidships. She was capable of a top speed of 15.7 knots (29.1 km/h; 18.1 mph) from 7,500 indicated horsepower (5,600 kW). Her crew consisted of 350 officers and enlisted men.

The ship carried a main battery of four 12 in (305 mm) 20-caliber breech-loading guns in two twin-gun turrets that were placed en echelon forward. These were supported by a secondary battery of two 5.9 in (150 mm) guns in a pair of single turrets, one at the bow and the other at the stern. For defense against torpedo boats, she carried a pair of 47 mm (1.9 in) Hotchkiss revolver cannon and eight 37 mm (1.5 in) Maxim-Nordenfelt quick-firing guns in casemates. Dingyuan was also equipped with three 14 in (356 mm) or 15 in (381 mm) torpedo tubes.

She was protected by compound armor that was 14 in for the armor belt, which covered the central part of the ship were the ammunition magazines and propulsion machinery spaces were located. An armor deck that was 3 in (76 mm) thick provided horizontal protection. Her conning tower was covered with 8 in (203 mm) of armor plate on the sides. The barbettes for the gun turrets were 12–14 in thick. A strake of armor that was 8 in thick protected the casemate guns.

== Service record ==
=== Early career ===
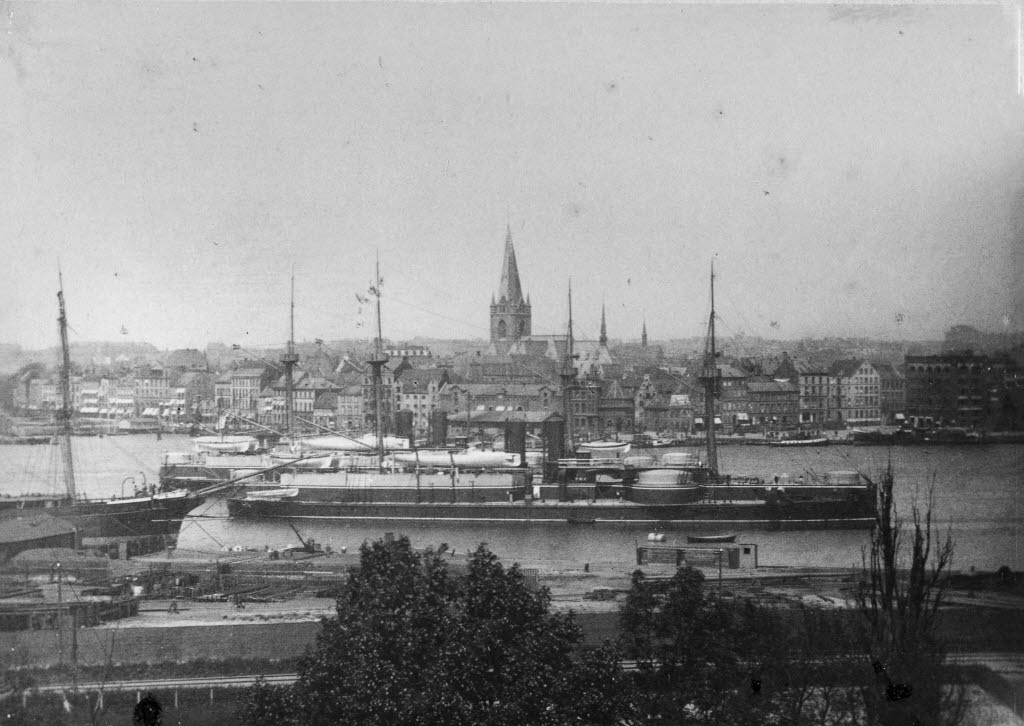
Zhenyuan and Dingyuan in Germany before departing for China

Dingyuan was ordered in 1880 and was laid down at the AG Vulcan shipyard in Stettin, Germany in March 1881; her name means "eternal peace" in Chinese. Work proceeded quickly and she was launched on 28 December 1881 to clear the slipway so work could begin on her sister ship Zhenyuan. Fitting-out work continued into May 1883, when the vessel was completed, but delivery was to be delayed until Zhenyuan was finished in April 1884. The start of the outbreak of the Sino-French War in August prevented both Dingyuan-class ships from being delivered until 1885, since Germany would not transfer the vessels to a country at war.

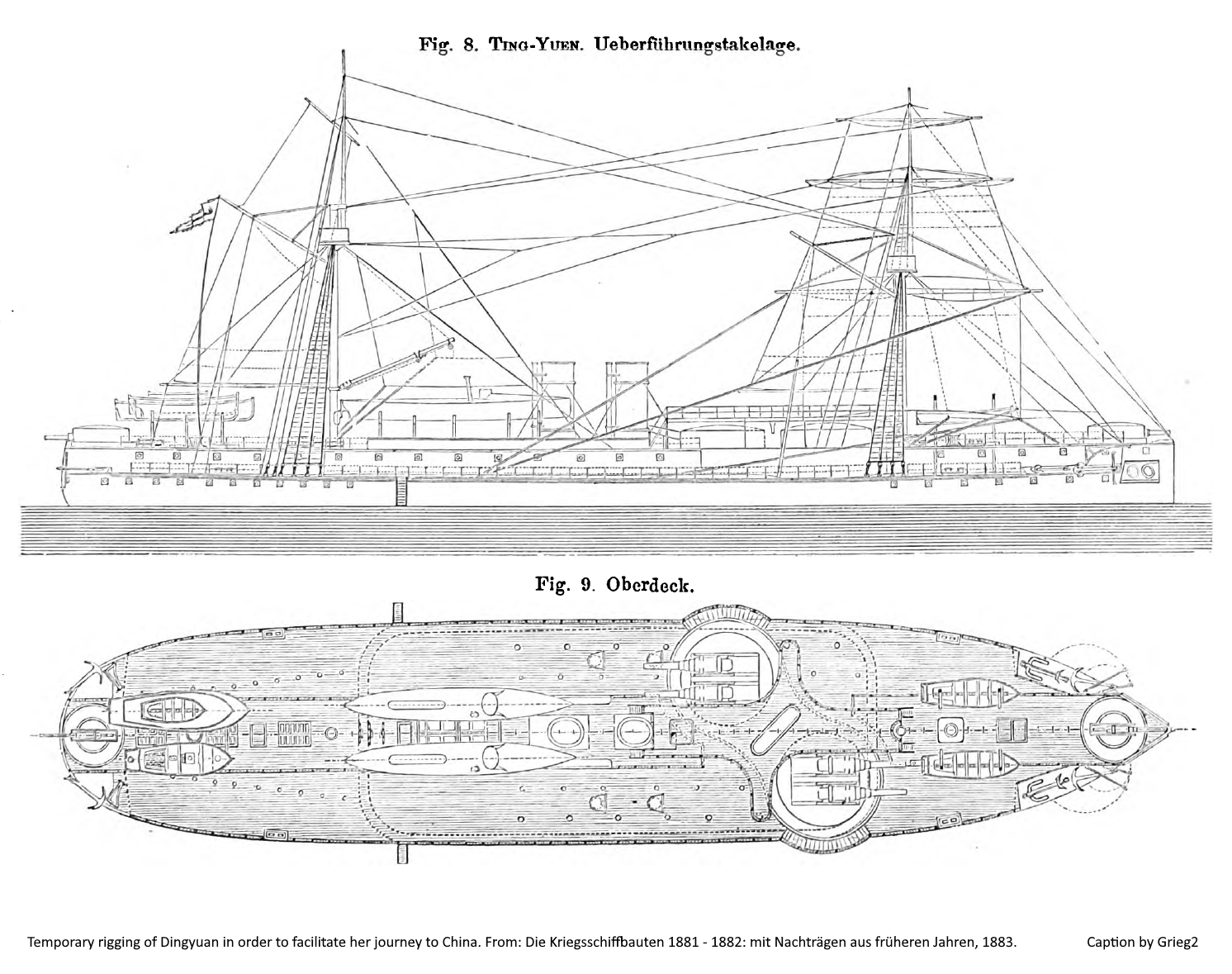
Temporary rigging for the journey to China

Both vessels were manned by German crews, sailing on 3 July 1885 under the German flag in company with the also German-built protected cruiser Jiyuan. The three ships arrived in Tianjin in November, where they were transferred to Chinese control. Li Hongzhang, the Viceroy of Zhili and director of China's naval construction program, inspected the vessels following their arrival. The two ironclads were then commissioned into the Beiyang Fleet, which was based in Port Arthur. The ships steamed south to Shanghai for the winter of 1885–1886.

In the 1880s, the Beiyang Fleet was occupied with an annual routine of winter training cruises to the South China Sea, often in company with the Nanyang Fleet. This cruise typically involved visits to Zhejiang, Fujian, and Guangdong provinces, and sometimes went as far south as stops in Southeast Asia. The rest of the year was spent in northern waters off Zhili, Shandong, and Fengtian provinces, conducting training exercises. Training cruises to foreign ports were conducted in the mid-1880s and early 1890s, both to train navigational skills on voyages far from shore and to show the flag. Discipline aboard the ships of the Beiyang Fleet was poor, which contributed to a low state of readiness of the ships. During this period, the fleet was commanded by Admiral Ding Ruchang, who employed Dingyuan as his flagship. At the time, China lacked dry docks large enough to handle Zhenyuan and Dingyuan, forcing the navy to rely on shipyards in Japan or in British Hong Kong for periodic maintenance.

The two Dingyuan-class ships began their training routine in April 1886 in joint maneuvers with the units of the Nanyang Fleet, which culminated in a naval review in Port Arthur. They received the British vessels of the China Station from 19 to 20 May. Dingyuan, Zhenyuan, and four cruisers made the first of their overseas cruises in August 1886, which included stops in British Hong Kong, Busan and Wonsan in Korea, Vladivostok, Russia, and Nagasaki, Japan. While at the latter port in August, Chinese crewmen became involved in an altercation with Japanese locals that resulted in the deaths of eight Chinese sailors and two Japanese police, with forty-two Chinese and twenty-nine Japanese injured. The so-called Nagasaki Incident was characterized by the Japanese press as an attempt by China to intimidate Japan, leading to calls for naval expansion to counter the Beiyang Fleet. The Japanese government ordered three Matsushima-class protected cruisers in response. The Japanese also refused to allow the Chinese ironclads to return for repairs in their shipyards, hampering the ability of the Beiyang Fleet to keep the vessels operational.

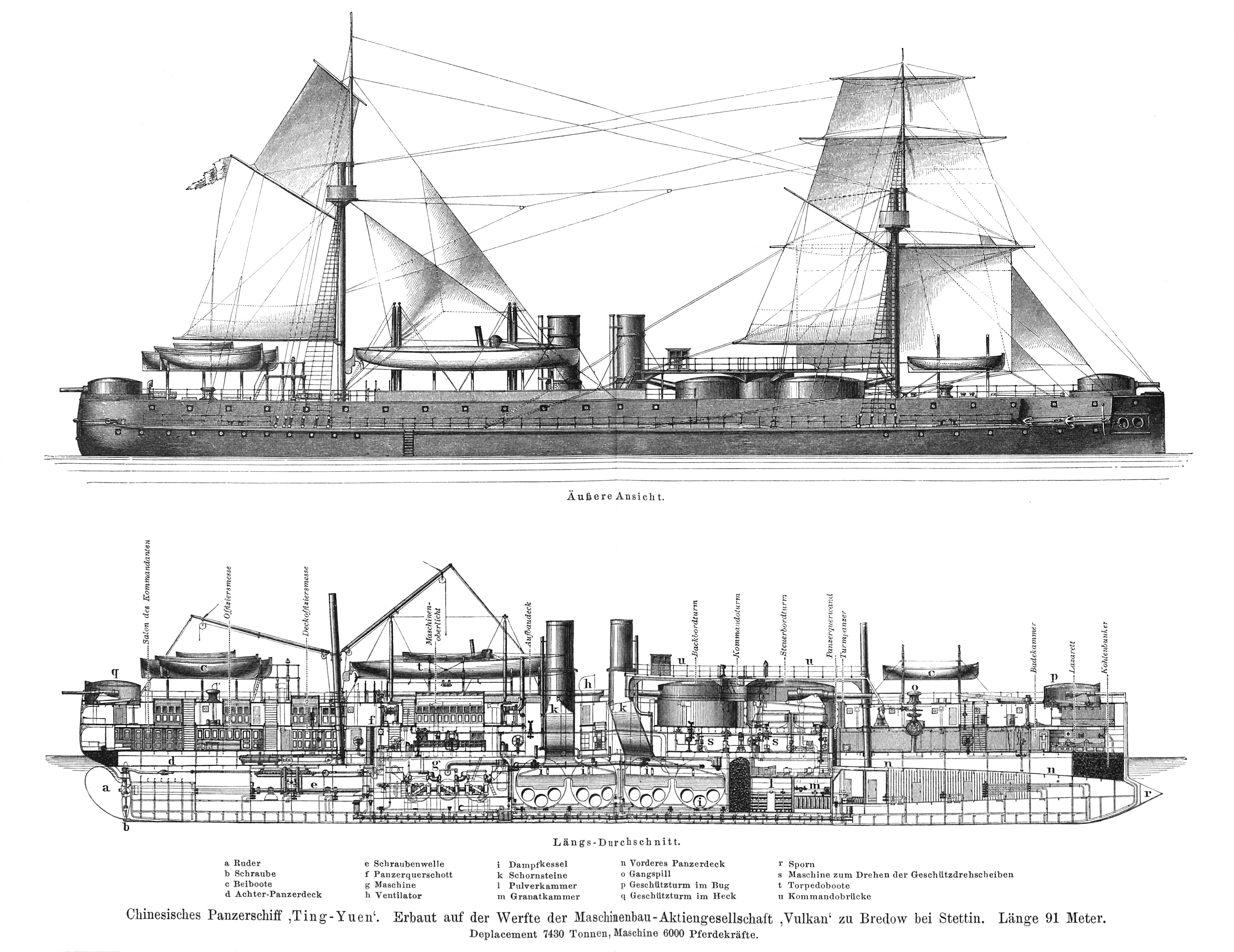
Dingyuan side view

The year 1887 passed less eventfully, with the ships spending the bulk of the year in the Bohai Sea. Late in the year, another group of four European-built cruisers arrived, further strengthening the fleet and necessitating extensive maneuvers in 1888 to familiarize the crews with the rest of the fleet. The Beiyang Fleet adopted the same black, white, and buff paint scheme used by the Royal Navy at the time, repainting their vessels at some point in 1888. In 1889, the fleet was divided into two divisions; Dingyuan and several cruisers were sent on a tour of Korean ports while Zhenyuan and the rest of the fleet remained in the Bohai Sea for exercises. The two divisions rendezvoused in Shanghai in December, thereafter proceeding to Hong Kong for Zhenyuan and Dingyuan to be drydocked. They then cruised off Korea.

Another visit to Japan came in June and July 1891; the fleet stopped in Kobe on 30 June and Yokohama on 14 July. At the latter port, a large Japanese delegation of senior military commanders and members of the imperial family received the ships. Another voyage to Japan took place the following year. Coupled with the Nagasaki Incident, these voyages contributed to the growing tensions between China and Japan, since Hongzhang intended them to make clear Chinese naval strength at a time the Japanese fleet was small and poorly developed. At the core of the dispute was control over Korea, which since the Convention of Tientsin of 1884, was treated as a co-protectorate of China and Japan.

=== First Sino-Japanese War ===
In early 1894, the Donghak Peasant Revolution broke out in Korea, prompting China to send an expedition of 28,000 to suppress the rebels. Japan viewed this as a violation of the Tientsin Convention and deployed 8,000 troops in response, leading to the outbreak of the First Sino-Japanese War on 1 August. The Chinese fleet was no match for the new Combined Fleet of Japan, as years of insufficient naval budgets had not allowed Hongzhang to update the vessels—funds he had planned to use to add new quick-firing guns to Zhenyuan and Dingyuan were instead appropriated for the 60th birthday of the Dowager Empress Cixi—and the Chinese lacked effective commanders and sufficiently trained crews. And to add to China's disadvantages during the war, the Japanese had broken the Chinese diplomatic codes in 1888, giving them access to China's internal communications.

As the Chinese made preparations in August for action, they removed the gun shields from the main battery turrets. Experience at the Battle of Pungdo had revealed the thin shields created numerous splinters when struck by enemy fire, and these fragments had inflicted numerous casualties to the gun crews of the cruiser Jiyuan at Pungdo. The crews also placed bags of coal around the gun batteries as a form of improvised armor. The ships were repainted light gray to make them more difficult to observe at sea. The ships of the Beiyang Fleet then steamed to Taku to take on supplies, thereafter doing little for the next month.

==== Battle of the Yalu River ====
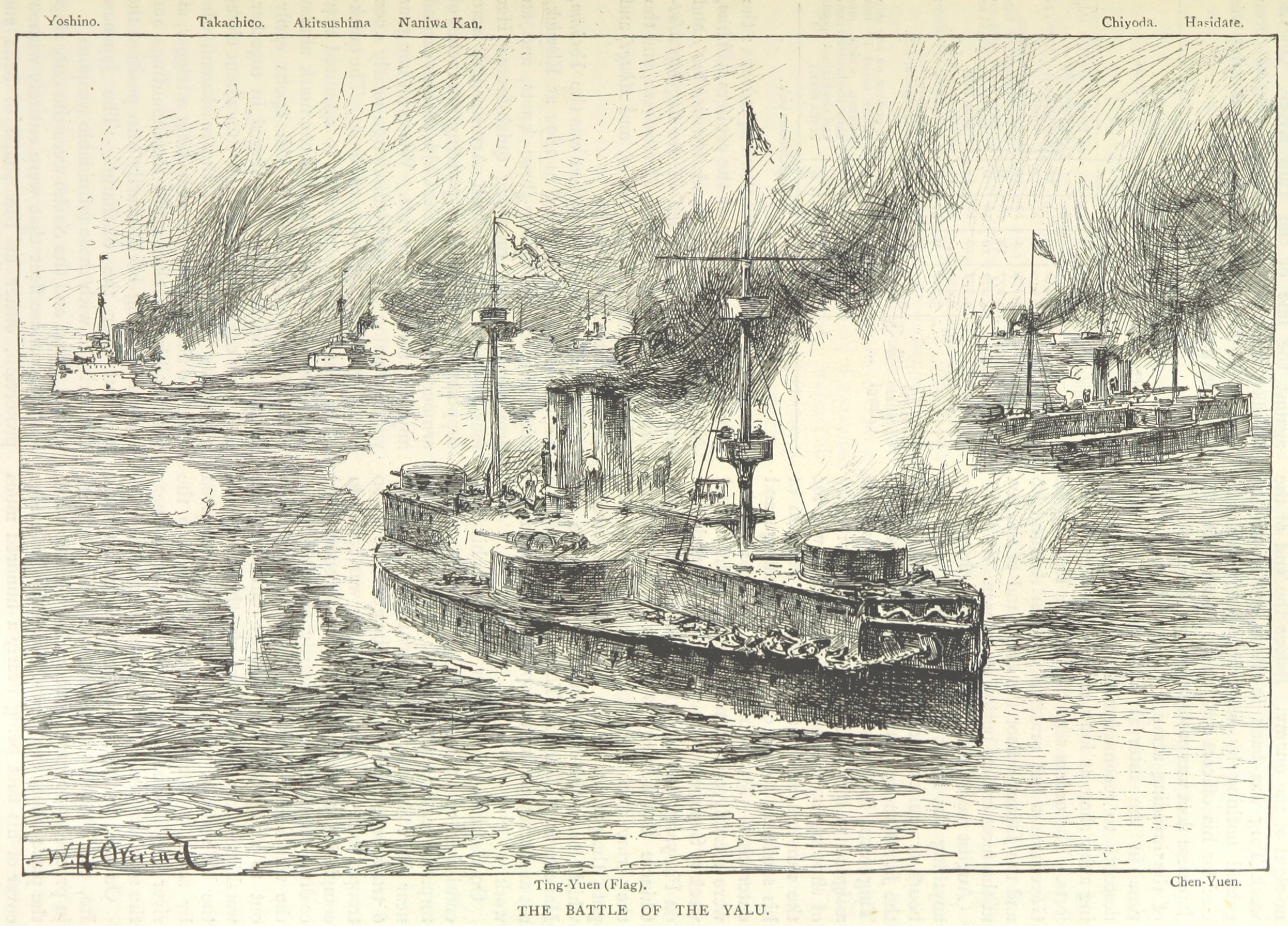
Sketch of Dingyuan (center) and Zhenyuan (right) under fire at the Yalu River

Ding took the fleet on a sweep into the Korea Bay on 12 September to clear the way for a convoy of troopships scheduled to deliver reinforcements to Korea. While on the way to the bay, he received faulty reports indicating the presence of Japanese warships off the Shandong Peninsula, prompting him to change course to search for them. Finding no enemy vessels, he took the fleet to Weihaiwei (now Weihai), and on 15 September, the fleet rendezvoused with the convoy to cover its approach to the mouth of the Yalu River, where the transports deposited the men and supplies on 16 September. During the unloading process, Dingyuan and the bulk of the fleet remained underway to provide distant support and avoid presenting themselves as stationary targets to Japanese torpedo boats known to be in the area. While the Chinese were on the way back to Port Arthur, the Combined Fleet under Vice Admiral Itō Sukeyuki intercepted them on 17 September, leading to the Battle of the Yalu River. The poorly trained Beiyang Fleet sailed in a disorganized line abreast formation, while the Japanese approached them from the south in line ahead; the Chinese ships steamed at around 6 knots (11 km/h; 6.9 mph) and the Japanese at 10 knots (19 km/h; 12 mph).

Itō turned his ships to pass in front of the oncoming Beiyang Fleet. Dingyuan opened fire first, at about 12:20, at the extreme range of 5,300 yd (4,800 m), far in excess of what fire-control equipment was capable of accurately directing at the time. The blast effect from Dingyuan's initial salvo destroyed her own bridge, collapsing it and trapping Ding and his staff for the duration of the action, depriving the Beiyang Fleet of central control. The rest of the Chinese fleet quickly followed Dingyuan, but failed to score any hits as their opponents passed in front. The Japanese ships returned fire at 12:25, having divided into two squadrons and turned back to starboard to encircle the Chinese. Concentrating their fire on the cruisers on the Chinese right flank, they quickly destroyed the Chinese cruisers Yangwei and Chaoyong. The battle quickly devolved into a melee at close range, and the Chinese cruisers Zhiyuan and Jingyuan were sunk. In return, the Chinese warships inflicted serious damage on the old ironclad Hiei, which had been unable to keep pace with the rest of Itō's fleet, and was eventually forced to disengage and flee. Zhenyuan and Dingyuan hit the auxiliary cruiser Saikyō Maru with four 12-inch shells and inflicted significant damage.

The Japanese ships then concentrated their fire on Dingyuan and Zhenyuan. The ships' heavy citadel armor proved to be impervious to the Japanese shellfire directed against it, though the large-caliber Canet guns mounted on the Matsushima-class cruisers proved to be nearly useless and the other Japanese cruisers were engaged with their Chinese counterparts. Both ships were hit numerous times and several fires broke out, but both crews adeptly suppressed them despite being under heavy fire. By around 17:00, both sides were low on ammunition and the Chinese began to reform their surviving vessels into line-ahead formation. The Japanese eventually broke off at around 17:30 and withdrew. The battered Beiyang Fleet, by then reduced to the two Dingyuan-class ships and four smaller vessels, limped back to Port Arthur, arriving there the next day.

==== Battle of Weihaiwei ====
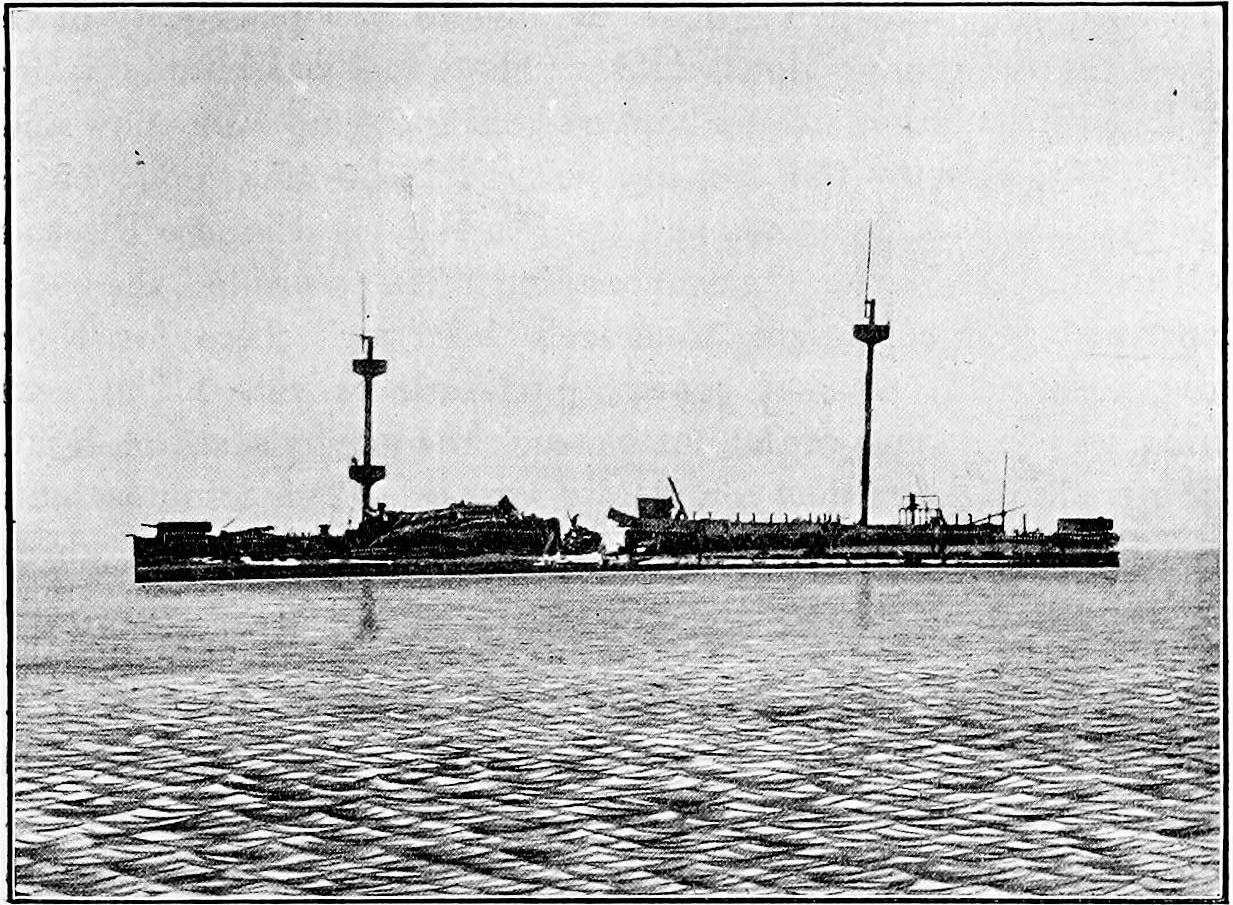
Dingyuan after the battle, showing extensive damage amidships

Repairs to the damaged ships began immediately, and fresh supplies and ammunition were sent to ready the vessels for action. By October, the Japanese Army had begun to approach Port Arthur, forcing the Chinese to withdraw the Beiyang Fleet to Weihaiwei. Ding sortied on 20 October and crossed the Bohai Strait to Weihaiwei without encountering Japanese forces. In early November, Ding sortied to cover the transfer of Zhenyuan, which had remained in Port Arthur as long as possible to complete repairs. The Japanese Army had advanced to Weihaiwei by the end of January 1895, launching a major attack on the port on the 30th to begin the Battle of Weihaiwei. They quickly captured the fortifications on the eastern side of the city despite heavy fire from Dingyuan and other vessels of the fleet. The capture of the fortresses forced the Chinese ships to withdraw to the western portion of the harbor, where they would be out of range for the guns there. Dingyuan disabled one of the 9.4 in (240 mm) disappearing guns in the fortress at Luchiehtsui, but several guns remained on operation, and Japanese gunners quickly set to work to bring them to bear on the trapped fleet. The Chinese ships bombarded Japanese forces as they advanced on the city's defenses.

A group of ten Japanese torpedo boats broke into the harbor on the night of 4/5 February and hit Dingyuan with a torpedo on the port side toward the stern. The attack inflicted serious damage and the crew's damage control efforts failed to contain the flooding, hampered by leaking watertight doors. They got steam up in the boilers and began to get underway, but with the uncontrolled flooding threatening to sink the ship, the crew was forced to ground her to prevent her from sinking. The ship was thereafter employed as a stationary artillery battery and Ding shifted his flag to Zhenyuan. Two of the attacking torpedo boats were discovered having been disabled in the previous night's action at dawn. The next night, the torpedo boats made another assault on the Chinese fleet, sinking a cruiser, a training ship, and an auxiliary vessel.

By 9 February, the Japanese had seized the fortifications that overlooked the rest of the harbor. They used the position to bombard the crippled Dingyuan with field artillery, further damaging the vessel. With their position in the harbor no longer tenable and most of the vessels damaged—Zhenyuan had also been badly damaged and was no longer seaworthy—Ding decided to scuttle Dingyuan the next day and then surrender. The decision provoked many of the senior officers of the Beiyang Fleet to commit suicide, including the ship's commander, Captain Liu Buchan. The exact nature of the crew's efforts to disable the vessel are unclear. Some reports indicate that a mine detonated amidships, and observers aboard the British protected cruiser HMS Edgar noted seeing a large explosion aboard Dingyuen. Photographic evidence, which shows the vessel aground in shallow water and with a gaping hole amidships, supports these reports, as does the observations of the British Vice Admiral Edmund Fremantle, who inspected the fleet shortly after the battle.

== Replica and rediscovery ==
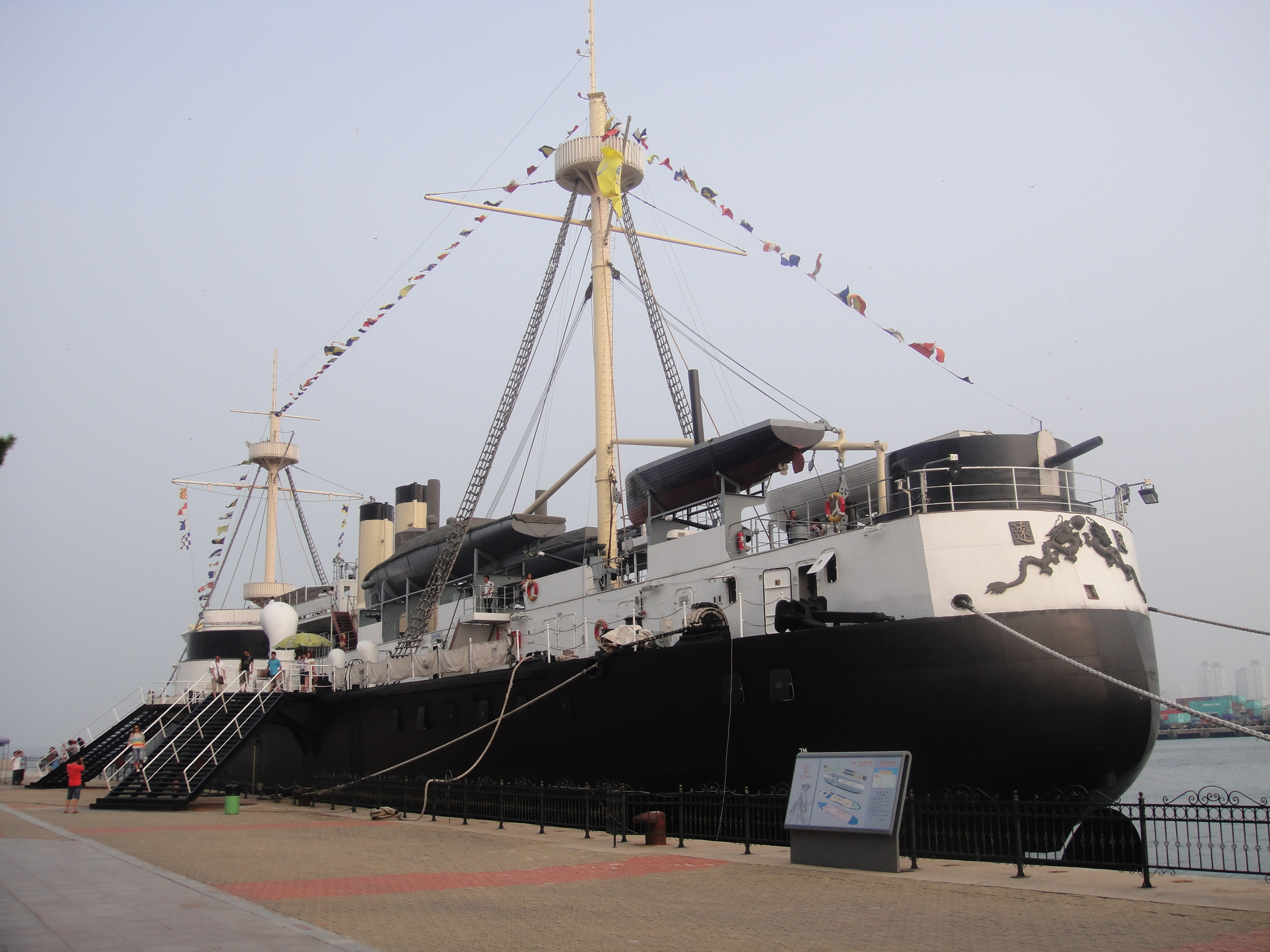
The replica of ironclad Dingyuan as a museum ship

The Chinese government constructed a replica of Dingyuan at Weihai to commemorate both the original vessel and the Beiyang Fleet during the war; the vessel, built on a 1:1 scale, is open as a museum ship. Work on the replica began at the end of 2003, with the main structure of the hull being completed one year later. The vessel was opened to the public at the end of April 2005.

On 2 September 2019 it was announced that the remains of Dingyuan had been located and over 150 artifacts recovered.

== See also ==
- Chinese gunboat Zhongshan, a gunboat preserved as a memorial and museum after its salvage in 1997
