= Pescadores campaign =

Pescadores campaign may refer to:

- Pescadores campaign (1885), French occupation of the islands, part of the Sino-French War
- Pescadores campaign (1895), Japanese conquest of the islands from China, part of the Japanese invasion of Taiwan
