= Battle of Weihaiwei =

Battle of the First Sino-Japanese War

Coordinates: 37.497°N 122.171°E

- Part of the First Sino-Japanese War
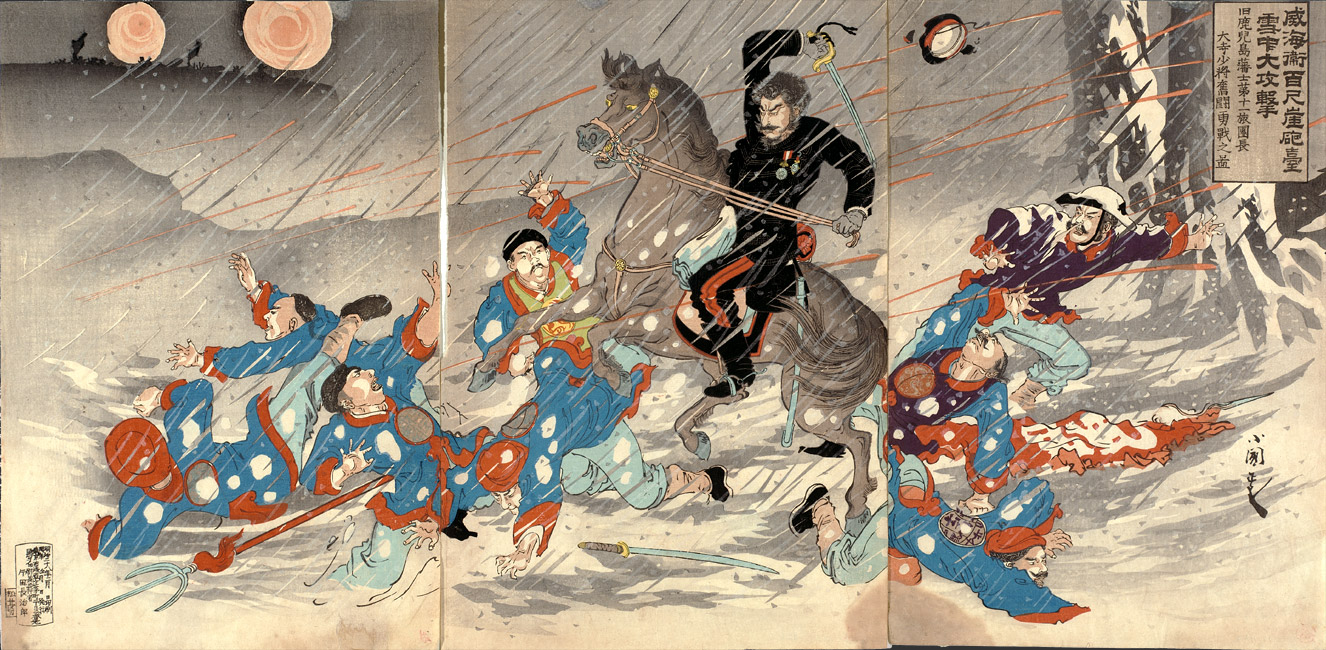
- Battle of Weihaiwei, Utagawa Kokunimasa
Date	January 20 – February 12, 1895
Location	Weihai, Shandong, China
Result	Japanese victory

Belligerents
Japan	China

Commanders and leaders
Ōyama Iwao; Itō Sukeyuki; Ōdera Yasuzumi †	Li Hongzhang (surrendered); Ding Ruchang ‡‡ Liu Buchan ‡‡

Strength
~25,000 men 13 cruisers 5 gunboats 15 torpedo boats	~10,000 men 2 battleships 1 coastal battleship 7 cruiser 6 gunboat 13 torpedo boats 7 other

Casualties and losses
Unknown	4,000 killed 1 battleship captured 1 battleship scuttled 1 coastal battleship captured 3 protected cruiser scuttled 1 protected cruiser captured 6 gunboat captured 6 torpedo boats destroyed 7 torpedo boats captured

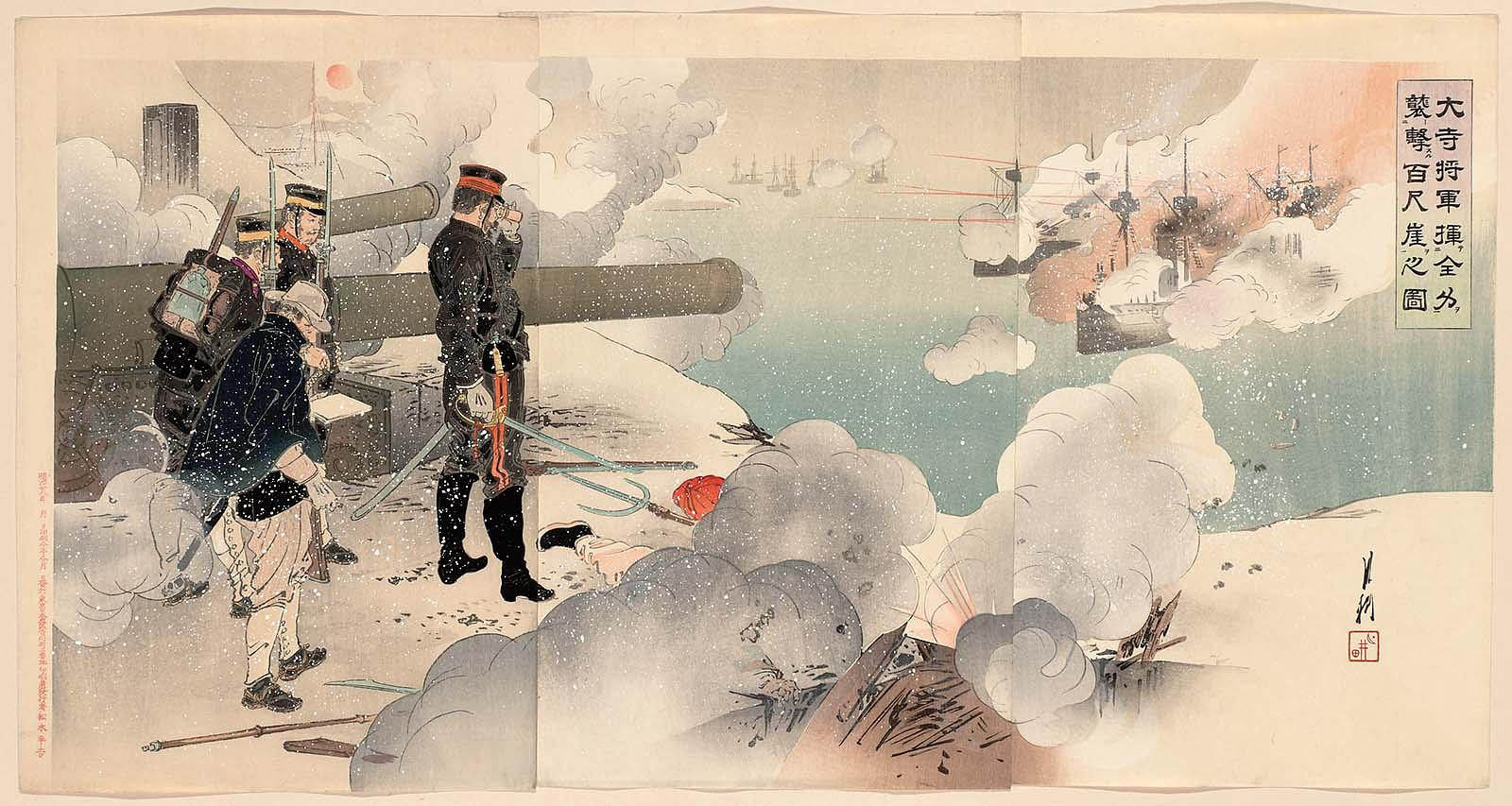
An incident in the Battle of Weihaiwei—Major General Ōdera at the cliff, 1895. Woodblock print by Ogata Gekkō, ink and color on paper triptych; 37.9 x 72.8 cm (14 15/16 x 28 11/16 in.) in the collection of the Museum of Fine Arts, Boston

The Battle of Weihaiwei (Japanese: Ikaiei-no-tatakai (威海衛の戦い) took place between 20 January and 12 February 1895, during the First Sino-Japanese War in Weihai, Shandong Province, China, between the forces of Japan and Qing China. In early January 1895, the Japanese landed forces in eastern Shandong, positioning them behind the Chinese naval base at Weihaiwei.

Through a well-coordinated offensive of both naval and land forces, the Japanese destroyed the forts and sank much of the Chinese fleet. With the Shandong and Liaoning peninsulas under Japanese control, the option for a pincer attack against the Chinese capital, Beijing, was now a possibility. This strategic threat forced the Chinese to sue for peace and led to the war's end in April 1895.

== Background ==
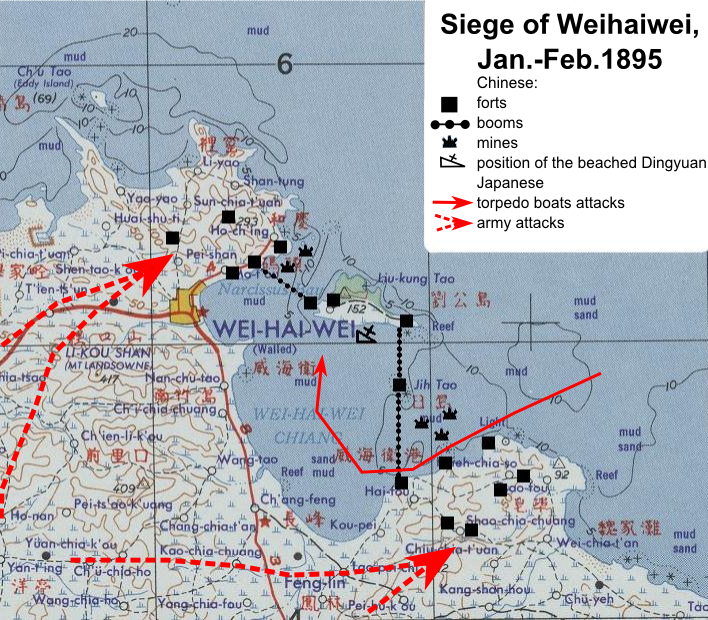
Map of operations against Weihaiwei

Following its victory at the Battle of Lushunkou on 21 November 1894, the next strategic objective of the Japanese campaign was to neutralize the Qing naval base at Weihaiwai on Shandong Peninsula. This would give Japan total control over the entrance to the Bay of Bohai, and the seaward approaches to Beijing. It would also eliminate any possible threat to Japanese supply lines by the remnants of the Beiyang Fleet.

The Qing naval base at Weihaiwei had been designed with the assistance of German military advisors, and was regarded by western observers as superior to Hong Kong. Captain William M. Lang, a British military advisor seconded to the Beiyang Fleet, had boasted that the base was impregnable as late as autumn 1894, and had scoffed at rumors that the Japanese were planning to attack it. The defenses consisted of a series of twelve land fortifications overlooking the entrances to the harbor, equipped with Krupp and Armstrong cannons, as well as two fortified islands in the bay. The entrances to the harbor were closed off by booms to prevent attacks from outside, and the remaining ships of the Beiyang Fleet were anchored inside. These included some 17 warships, led by the battleship Dingyuan, protected cruisers Jingyuen and Pingyuan, and 13 torpedo boats.

== Chinese Fortifications ==
In peacetime, these forts had a garrison of 3,700 troops. With reinforcements and the addition of the naval personnel, the strength of the Chinese forces at the port grew to 10,600. An additional 4,000 men had been dispatched from Tianjin on 4 January but had not arrived before the attack. However, the Chinese soldiers performed poorly and Ding Ruchang's sailors were the only formation he trusted.

At Dengzhou (a part of modern Penglai), the target of a Japanese diversionary attack there were 4 210mm guns and 6 150mm Krupp guns.

The Fortifications of Weihaiwei
Location and type	28cm	26cm	24cm	21cm	15cm	12cm
Southern Land					4	8 (4QF)
Southern Coastal	2		7	2	2	
Insular		2*	8**			2*
Northern Land					4	4 (QF)
Northern Coastal			6	4	2	
Total	2	2	21	6	12	14

- of these 4 guns 2 are disappearing

** indicates disappearing guns

== Events of the battle ==
The campaign began on 18 January 1895, with a bombardment of the town of Dengzhou, some 100 miles (160 km) to the west of Weihaiwei, by the Imperial Japanese Navy cruisers Yoshino, Akitsushima, and Naniwa. This was a diversion to draw attention away from the landing of the Imperial Japanese Army's Japanese Second Army under the overall command of General Ōyama Iwao at Rongcheng, to the east of Weihaiwei. The Japanese forces, which consisted of the 2nd Division under Lieutenant General Sakuma Samata, and the 6th Division (less its 12th Brigade, which was left to garrison Lushunkou) under General Kuroki Tamemoto, completed its landing without opposition by 22 January.

The Japanese divided into two columns, one following the coastal road, and the other struggling along a path some four miles inland, both departing Roncheng on 26 January. The timing of the attack had been planned to coincide with Chinese New Year, and the invasion encountered no resistance as they converged on Weihaiwei on 29 January.

The Japanese launched a three-pronged attack on the landward fortifications to the south and east of the town on 30 January. The attack was hampered by the severe winter cold and blizzard conditions, with temperatures as low as −6 °C. The Beiyang Army made a stand for around nine hours, before retreating, leaving the fortifications largely intact. Japanese casualties were unknown except for the death of Major General Ōdera Yasuzumi, who was the highest-ranking Japanese casualty of the war. Japanese troops entered the town of Weihai on 2 February without opposition, as its garrison had fled the night before.

With the guns of the land fortifications now in Japanese hands, and in position to fire upon the Beiyang Fleet, Admiral Ding Ruchang's situation became precarious. Furthermore, the Japanese managed to remove the boom protecting the anchorage on 4 February, allowing their torpedo boats to make repeated night attacks on the Chinese ships. A combined Japanese fleet attack from 7 February severely damaged Dingyuen and sank three other vessels. The crews of the remaining Chinese torpedo boats mutinied and attempted to escape towards Yentai, but in total six were destroyed and the remaining seven were captured by the Japanese.

As a Chinese defeat appeared certain, Japanese Admiral Itō Sukeyuki made an appeal to Admiral Ding, who was a personal friend. In his letter, he expressed his regret that the old acquaintances had been obliged to meet each other in hostility, appealed to Ding's patriotism by pointing out the retrogressive policy which Ding had been called upon to defend and which could only end in disaster, and then counseled him to prevent a certain defeat and unnecessary loss of life by capitulating. Ito further advised Ding to accept political asylum in Japan until the end of the war, and then return to his native land in order to aid China in setting her policy on a sound basis. When Ding read this message he was visibly moved, but wrote a letter in response stating, "I am thankful for the admiral's friendship, but I cannot forsake my duties to the state. The only thing now remaining for me to do is to die." Ding committed suicide by overdose of opium in his office at his Liugong Island headquarters. His deputy, Admiral Liu Buchan, after ordering that his warship be scuttled by explosives, also committed suicide.

Command of the Beiyang Fleet fell to Scottish-born Vice-Admiral John McClure who wrote a letter of surrender in Admiral Ding's name, and had it translated into Chinese and transmitted to the Japanese on the morning of 12 February. Per the terms of the letter, the remaining ships, forts, and stores were surrendered to the Japanese. McClure requested that all Chinese troops, civilians, and the foreign military advisors be allowed to depart unmolested, and suggested that the British China squadron oversee compliance with the surrender agreement. Admiral Itō, despite the reservations of some members of his staff, agreed to all terms. The manner of Admiral Ding's death made him a tragic hero in Japanese eyes, and Admiral Itō further insisted that the body of Admiral Ding be treated with respect.

== Aftermath ==
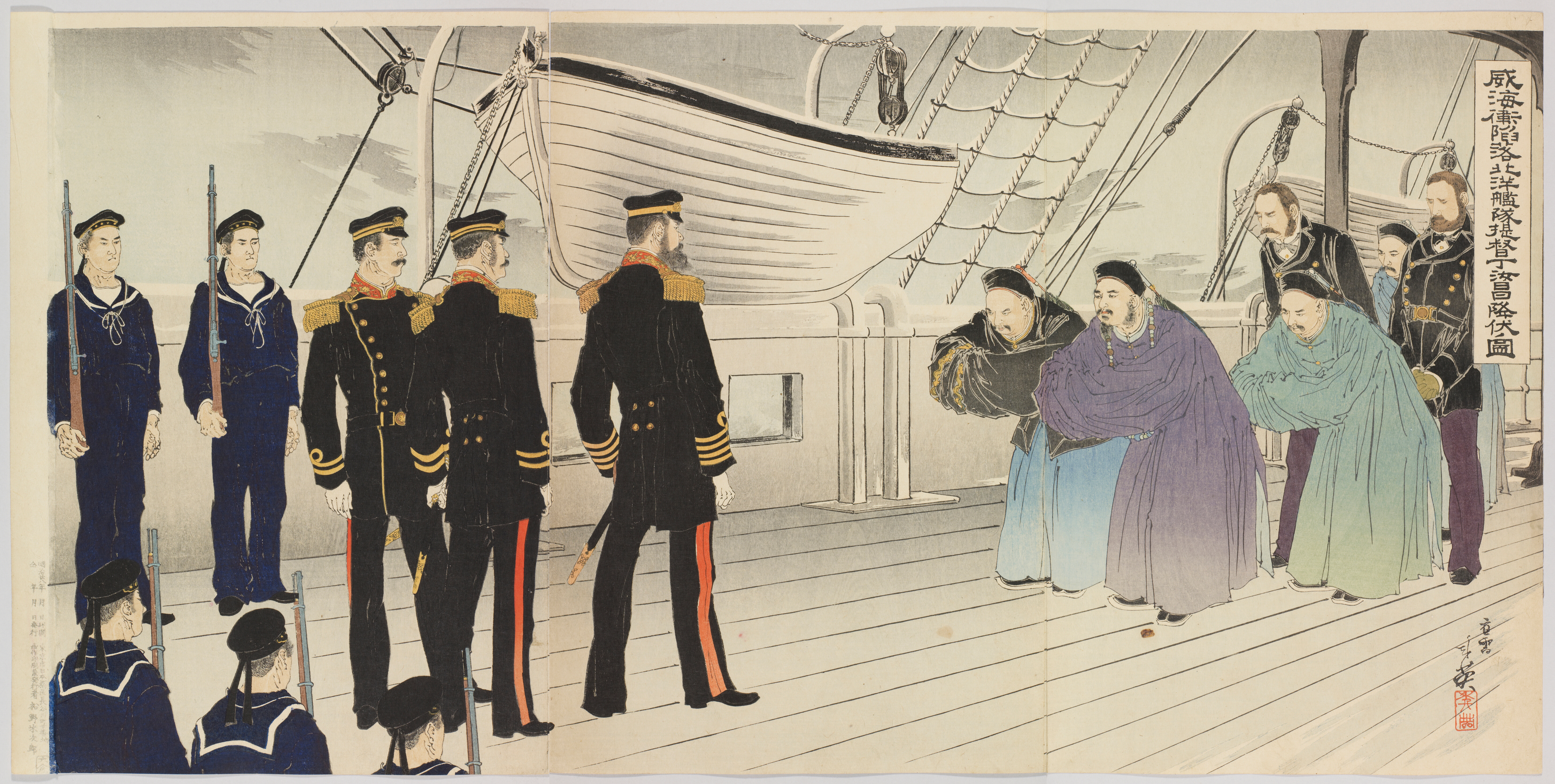
Ukiyo-e, by Toshihide Migita, depicting Chinese forces surrendering to Admiral Itō at the Battle of Weihaiwei. In reality, Ding had committed suicide after his defeat and never surrendered.

With the fall of Weihaiwai, Prince Gong ordered that the Admiralty Board in Beijing be abolished, as China no longer had a navy. The Japanese had gained their strategic objectives of securing the seaward approach to Beijing, as well as their supply lines, and had received praise from foreign observers for the speed of the campaign.

The Battle of Weihaiwei is regarded as the last major battle of the First Sino-Japanese War, since China entered into peace negotiations in earnest with Japan shortly thereafter. However, the Battle of Yingkou and a number of minor battles would take place before the Treaty of Shimonoseki ending the war was signed.
