= Liu Buchan =

Chinese naval officer (1852–1895)

Liu Buchan 劉步蟾
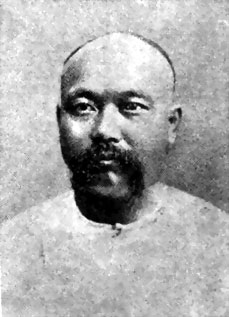
- Admiral Liu Buchan
- Born: 1852; Houguan county, Fuzhou Prefecture, Fujian, Qing dynasty (now Fuzhou, Fujian, China)
- Died: 1895 (aged 42–43); Liugong Island, Wendeng County, Dengzhou Prefecture, Shandong, Qing dynasty (now in Penglai, Shandong, China)
- Military career
- Allegiance: Qing dynasty
- Branch: Beiyang Fleet
- Service years: 1872–1895
- Rank: Admiral
- Conflicts: First Sino-Japanese War; Battle of Yalu River; Battle of Weihaiwei †

Liu Buchan (simplified Chinese: 刘步蟾; traditional Chinese: 劉步蟾; pinyin: Liú Bùchán; 1852 – 1895) was a Chinese naval officer during the First Sino-Japanese War. He served in the Beiyang Fleet, the most prominent of China's naval units in the late Qing Dynasty, and is best remembered for his actions as commander of the fleet flagship, the Dingyuan, during the war. After his death and the ship being destroyed at the end of the war, he was raised to national hero status in modern China. At his death, Liu was commander of the fleet flagship, with the rank Admiral of the Right, and reserve Admiral of the Fleet.

On 4 February 1895, the Dingyuan was damaged in a surprise attack by Japanese torpedo boats. On 9 February 1895, the Japanese army took over the shore batteries, and fired upon the Dingyuan. Fearing that the naval base at Liugong Island would soon fall, and that the Dingyuan would fall into enemy hands, Liu ordered the scuttling of the Dingyuan. That same night, Liu killed himself by swallowing opium.

== Life ==
Liu was born in the town of Houguan, in Fuzhou, China. Liu's father died before he was born, and he was brought up by his mother. In 1867, he passed the entry examinations and entered the Foochow Arsenal Naval School established by Shen Baozhen to study navigation. In 1871, was on the training ship Jianwei, and he visited Amoy, Hong Kong, Singapore and the Bohai Bay. In 1872, with the best results, Liu graduated in the first class of the Foochow Arsenal Naval School. In 1875, he was appointed commander of the training ship Jianwei. In 1876, he was sent to Britain for further training. He served on the Royal Navy's Mediterranean Fleet flagship HMS Hercules as a trainee first mate. He returned to China in 1878 and was given command of the Zhenbei in the Beiyang Fleet.

In 1881, Viceroy Li Hongzhang, the Beiyang minister, sent a command with a German shipyard for the construction of two battleships (the Dingyuan and the Zhenyuan). Liu was sent to monitor construction and inspect the ships, and to assist in delivering the two warships back to China. In 1885 got back to China aboard the Dingyuan, upon which he was given command of the Dingyuan, with Commodore rank. In 1888, the Beiyang Fleet was officially established. Liu participated in drawing up the Fleet's charter, and was subsequently promoted to the Right Wing command of Admiral. Viceroy Li was highly impressed with Liu, and in his secret missive to the court said Liu had "talents that could be placed to great use".

In 1890, the Beiyang Fleet visited Hong Kong. When Fleet Admiral Ding Ruchang left his ship, Liu took down the fleet admiral flag and put up his admiral flag. The fleet's chief training officer, Royal Navy captain and Englishman William Lang raised issue with this, and complained to Li Hongzhang. In the subsequent dispute, Li supported Liu, and in response William Lang resigned from the Beiyang Fleet.

In the years leading up to the First Sino-Japanese War in 1894, Liu repeatedly pressed Li Hongzhang to develop the Beiyang Fleet. He pointed out that Japan was enthusiastically expanding its navy, and to keep up the Beiyang Fleet must adopt an annual program to add new ships. However, Li Hongzhang was unable to expand the Beiyang Fleet due to the realities of court politics. The First Sino-Japanese War began in 1894, and on 17 September of that year, the Beiyang Fleet encountered the Japanese Combined Fleet on the Yellow Sea, sparking the Battle of the Yalu River.

During the Battle of the Yalu River, Liu Buchan commanded the flagship Dingyuan - the most powerful ship of the Beiyang Fleet - in battle against the Japanese fleet. The battle lasted into the afternoon and the Dingyuan was struck multiple times. As Admiral Ding Ruchang, the fleet commander, had been seriously wounded early in the battle, Liu had to assume command of the entire fleet. For his bravery during the battle, Liu was promoted to reserve Admiral of the Fleet after the battle, and acted as commander of the fleets while Ding Ruchang recovered from his injuries.

Shortly afterwards, on 4 February 1895, Japanese torpedo boats launched a surprise attack on the Beiyang Fleet's home base at Weihaiwei, during which the Dingyuan was hit and began taking on water. Liu ordered the ship run aground and to continue firing as an artillery battery. On 9 February 1895 the Japanese army took over the shore batteries, and fired upon and hit the Dingyuan. Fearing that the naval base at Liugong Island would soon fall, and that the Dingyuan would fall into enemy hands, he ordered that the Dingyuan be scuttled. That night, Liu killed himself by swallowing opium. The Qing government, appreciating his service, ordered that benefits be given with the status of an admiral of the fleet.

== Assessment ==
In the 20th century, Liu received both criticism and praise. The criticism was mainly from William Tyler's - an English sailor on Dingyuan - memoir. But there were also widely accepted ideas that there was a personal enmity between William Tyler and Liu Buchan and that William Tyler's words were unreliable. Liu Buchan is argued to have lacked adequate experience before he was appointed as the captain of Dingyuan and training and command were very bad under him. Second, he was addicted to opium, which was universal among his troops.

== Sources ==
- "LiHongzhang (李鸿章) Complete" chief editor, GuTinglong (顾廷龙), YeYalian (叶亚廉) I, II, III, printed by ShangHai RenMing press in 1986.
- "Naval historical materials in the late Qing Dynasty", edited by ZhangXia (张侠), YangZhibeng (杨志本), LuoPengshu (罗澎树), ZhangLiming (张利民), printed in 1982 by BeiJing HaiYang press.
- "Sino-Japanese History", editor, QiQizhang (戚其章), printed in 1990 by BeiJing RenMing press.
- "The Fleet under the Flying Dragon Flag" (the revised edition), edited by Jiang Ming (姜鸣, jiāng míng), printed in December 2001 by Bei Jing Sanlian press.
- "China's Recent Navy Historical Events Log", edited by Jiang Ming (姜鸣, jiāng míng), printed in December 1994 by Bei Jing Sanlian press.
- "Fujian Ship-building Burean Historical Manuscript", edited by Lin Qingyuan (林庆元, lín qìng yuán), printed in October 1986 by Fujian People's press.
- "Ding Ruchang Volumes", edited by Qi Junjie (戚俊杰, Qī Jùn Jíe), Wang Jihua (王记华, Wáng Jì huá) printed in August 1997 by Shandong University press.
