= Pescadores campaign (1895) =

Battle of the First Sino-Japanese War

- Part of the First Sino-Japanese War and the Japanese invasion of Taiwan (1895)
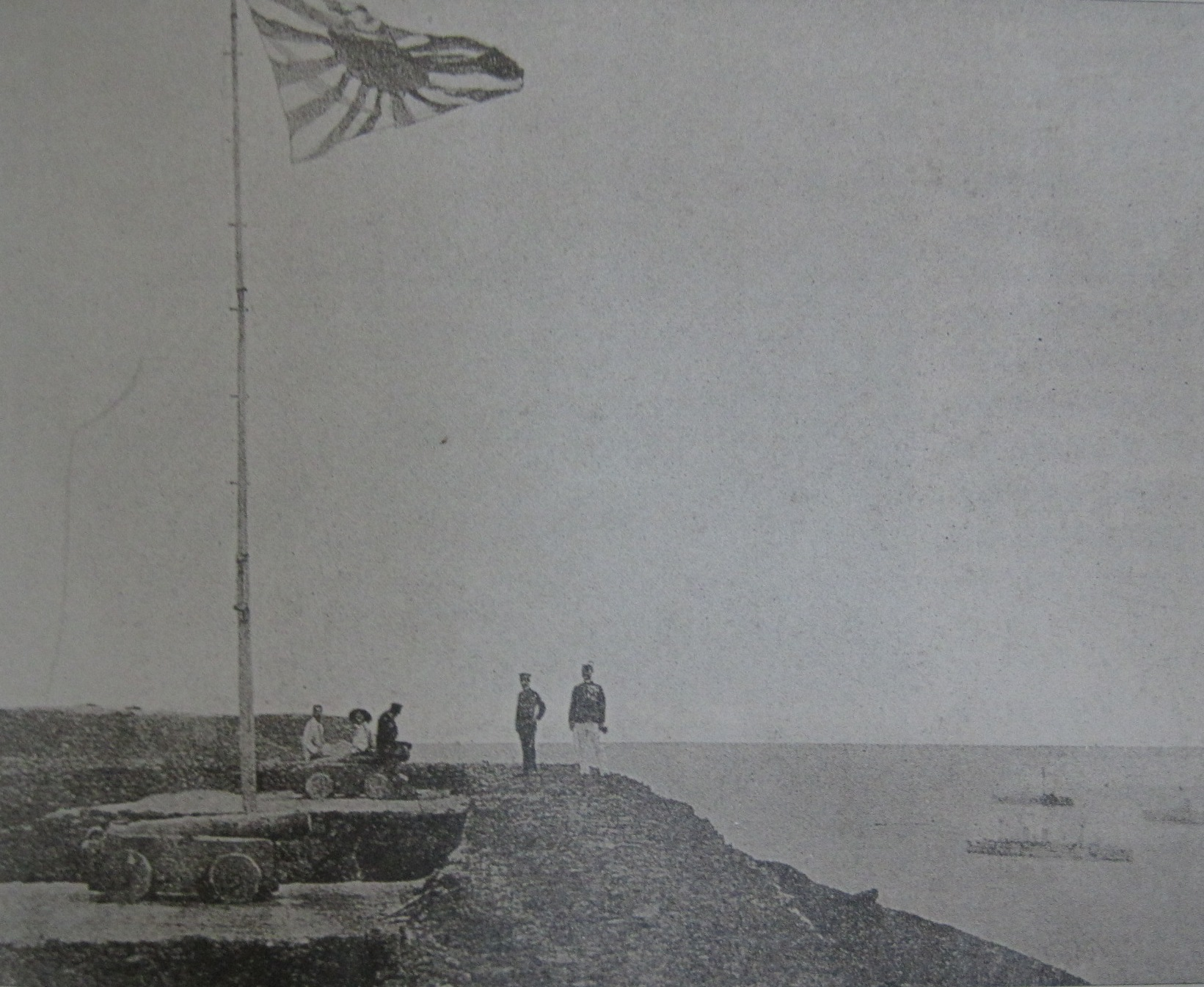
- The Rising Sun Flag flying over Yuweng Island after its occupation by Japan
Date	23–26 March 1895
Location	Pescadores Islands, China
Result	Japanese victory
Territorial changes	Japanese occupation of the Penghu Islands

Belligerents
Japan	China

Commanders and leaders
Itō Sukeyuki; Tōgō Heihachirō; Dewa Shigetō; Hishijima Yoshiteru	Zhu Shangpan

Strength
11,000	13,642

Casualties and losses
Minimal	Heavy

The Pescadores campaign (23–26 March 1895) was the last military operation of the First Sino-Japanese War and an essential preliminary to the Japanese conquest of Taiwan.

== Background ==
As the First Sino-Japanese War approached its end, the Japanese took steps to ensure that Qing-ruled Formosa (Taiwan) and the Pescadores (Penghu) would be ceded to Japan under the eventual peace treaty. Although hostilities in northern China were halted during the peace negotiations that eventually resulted in the Treaty of Shimonoseki (April 1895), Taiwan and the Pescadores were specifically excluded from the scope of the armistice, allowing the Japanese to mount a military operation against them without imperiling the peace negotiations. The key to the capture of Taiwan was the Pescadores, which lay midway between mainland China and Taiwan. Their occupation by the Japanese would prevent further Chinese reinforcements from being sent across the Taiwan Strait.

On 15 March 1895, a Japanese expeditionary force of 5,500 men set sail for the Pescadores Islands. The expeditionary force landed on Pa-chau Island (八罩嶼; modern-day Wangan), to the south of the main Pescadores archipelago, on the morning of 23 March.

== Campaign ==
Although the Pescadores were garrisoned by 15 Chinese regular battalions (5,000 men) and defended by the recently completed Hsi-tai coastal defense battery (built in the late 1880s in response to the capture of Pescadores by the French during the Sino-French War), the Japanese met very little resistance during the landing operation as the defenders were demoralized. It took the Japanese only three days to secure the islands. After a naval bombardment of the Chinese forts, Japanese troops went ashore on Fisher Island (漁翁島; modern-day Siyu) and Penghu Island on 24 March, fought several brief actions with defending Chinese troops, and captured the Hsi-tai battery (known to the Japanese, from the Japanese pronunciation of its Chinese characters, as the Kon-peh-tai fort; likely 拱北砲臺) and Makung. In the next two days they occupied the other main islands of the Pescadores group.

The following detailed account of the 1895 Pescadores campaign, drawing on official Japanese sources, was included by James W. Davidson in his book The Island of Formosa, Past and Present, published in 1903. Davidson was a war correspondent with the Japanese army during the invasion of Taiwan, and enjoyed privileged access to senior Japanese officers.

On March 20th, after a five days' trip from Sasebo naval station, the expedition, consisting of the fleet and the transports, arrived off the Pescadores and anchored near Pachau island to the south of the principal islands of the group. Bad weather on the 21st and 22nd prevented an immediate attack on the forts; but on the 23rd, the storm having abated, the ships got underway, and at 9.30 a.m., upon the first flying squadron drawing near Hau-chiau [候角?], the fleet subjected the Kon-peh-tai fort to a heavy bombardment, to which the Chinese replied for nearly an hour before they were silenced.

During the afternoon, the disembarkation of the troops commenced. By the aid of steam pinnaces each towing several cutters, the troops, consisting of the 1st, 2nd, 3rd and 4th Companies of the 1st Regiment of reserves under the command of Colonel Hishijima, were all landed in less than two hours. The landing of the troops brought the Kon-peh-tai fort into action again, but without inflicting much damage on the Japanese. The troops on shore engaged in a skirmish with some 300 Chinese soldiers, afterward reinforced by 150 more, near a commanding knoll which both forces were desirous of occupying. After a few volleys from the Japanese, answered by an irregular fire from the Chinese, the latter eventually fled, leaving the position in the hands of the Japanese. Staff-quarters were then established in the village of Chien-shan [尖山社].

At 2.30 on the morning of the 24th, the troops advanced with the intention of taking the Kon-peh-tai fort and Makung (Bako) with a temporary company of mountain artillery under Captain Arai and the naval contingent with quick firing guns under Naval Lieutenant Tajima in the van. The night was very dark and the only available route was so frequently cut up with ditches running in every direction that progress was laboriously slow; only some two miles being made after three hours of painful tramping. By about 4 a.m., the Japanese force had all reached the rallying ground, and thirty minutes later, led by the 2nd Battalion of the 1st Regiment of reserves, were advancing towards the fort. The 5th Company, under the command of Captain Kinoshita, formed the advance guard, and a detachment of this company, under command of Lieutenant Ishii, were the first to engage the Chinese forces, 200 of whom had taken up a position outside the fort and appeared to dispute the advance of the Japanese. The engagement was very brief, the Chinese flying before the small number of determined Japanese. Meanwhile, the temporary battery of mountain artillery had been shelling the fort from a position too far distant to do much damage to the stronghold, but in a manner sufficiently effective to frighten out the garrison, who left in such haste that, thirty minutes after the first gun had been fired, the Japanese were in possession. Thus was the principal port captured in the Pescadores.

The naval contingent were also enabled to participate in the engagement, and with their two quick-firing guns did much execution. The 4th Company of the 1st Regiment of reserves and the naval contingent captured the village, after only a slight skirmish with the enemy. The place had been held by a garrison 500 strong. With the 2nd Company of the 1st Regiment of reserves leading the van, the Japanese forces now reassembled and advanced on the capital and principal city of the islands, Makung. No opposition was encountered on the way, with the exception of some ineffective firing from the Yui-wang island fort [漁翁島砲臺]; and upon reaching the city, the 1st Company stormed the Chinese infantry encampment, being followed soon after by the 2nd Company, which dashed through the gateway with the intention of dividing into three sections and attacking the enemy from different sides. But, to their amazement, their plans were found unnecessary, the garrison, with the exception of some thirty who did make a slight show of resistance, having fled. Some shots were fired at a few stragglers, and at 11.50 a.m. the occupation of the city was complete.

Another engagement the same day resulted in the capture of the fort in the Yuan-ching peninsula [圓頂半島] by Commander Tanji with a naval force; about 500 of the enemy surrendering without making any resistance whatever. Two days later (March 26th), blue jackets occupied the Yui-wang island forts and found the place empty, the garrison having fled. Soon after the Japanese entered, a native presented himself, apparently on a very important mission, which proved to be the delivery of a letter stating that the Chinese commander and garrison wished to inform the Japanese that they surrendered the fort. Thus fell the key to Southern China.

The Chinese prisoners, with the exception of eight officers, were given their liberty. The spoils of the little campaign were considerable, including 18 cannon, 2,663 rifles, over a million rounds of ammunition, 797 casks, and 3,173 bags of powder, a thousand bags of rice, etc., etc. Rear-Admiral Tanaka occupied the post of first governor of the group, and a government office and military post offices were at once erected.

— James W. Davidson, The Island of Formosa, Past and Present

== Casualties ==
Japanese battle casualties were minimal. However, an outbreak of cholera shortly after the capture of the islands claimed the lives of more than 1,500 Japanese soldiers within a few days.

== See also ==
- Taiwanese resistance to Japanese colonialism
