= Itō Sukeyuki =

Japanese admiral (1843–1914)

Count Itō Sukeyuki
- 伊東 祐亨
- Born: 9 June 1843; Kagoshima, Satsuma domain, Japan
- Died: 16 January 1914 (aged 70); Tokyo, Japan
- Military career
- Allegiance: Empire of Japan
- Branch: Imperial Japanese Navy
- Service years: 1871–1907
- Rank: Marshal Admiral
- Commands: Daiichi Teibo; Kasuga; Azuma; Nisshin; Ryūjō; Hiei; Fusō; Naniwa; Combined Fleet; Yokosuka Naval District; Chief of IJN General Staff
- Conflicts: Anglo-Satsuma War; Boshin War; First Sino-Japanese War; Battle of the Yellow Sea; Battle of Weihaiwei; Russo-Japanese War
- Awards: Order of the Golden Kite (1st class); Grand Cordon of the Supreme Order of the Chrysanthemum

Marshal-Admiral Count Itō Sukeyuki (伊東 祐亨, Itō Sukeyuki; also known as Itō Yūkō) (9 June 1843 – 16 January 1914) was a Japanese career officer and admiral in the Imperial Japanese Navy in Meiji-period Japan.

== Biography ==
Born in what is now part of Kagoshima City, the fourth son of a samurai of the Satsuma Domain, Itō studied English and Western learning at the domain's Kaiseijo school, gunnery under Egawa Hidetatsu, and navigation at Katsu Kaishū's Kobe Naval Training Center alongside Sakamoto Ryōma and Mutsu Munemitsu. He participated in the Anglo-Satsuma War as a member of the Satsuma domain's navy. Popular accounts describe him as part of a small unit that attempted to board a British warship disguised as watermelon sellers; the attempt was discovered and failed. Before the Boshin War, Itō had already relocated to Edo and had placed his naval skills at the service of the forces striving to overthrow the Tokugawa Shogunate. He escaped from the burning of the Satsuma Domain residence in Edo and fought in several of the war's naval engagements, including off Awa and in Miyako Bay.

After the Meiji Restoration, Itō was commissioned as a lieutenant and served on the corvette Nisshin in the fledgling Imperial Japanese Navy, commanding the Nisshin from 1877. During the Satsuma Rebellion that same year, Itō remained with the navy rather than joining the rebellion led by Saigō Takamori. Promoted to captain in 1882, he served on many warships of the Imperial Japanese Navy in its pioneer days, notably the Ryūjō, Fusō, and Hiei. In 1885, he was placed in charge of the Yokosuka Naval Arsenal. The same year, he travelled to the United Kingdom, and brought the Naniwa back to Japan.

On 15 June 1886, he was promoted to rear admiral, and made commandant of the Imperial Japanese Navy Academy. He was promoted to vice admiral on 12 December 1892 and made commandant of the Yokosuka Naval District. On 20 May 1893, he became commander-in-chief of the Readiness Fleet.

With the start of the First Sino-Japanese War in 1894, he became the first Commander-in-Chief of the Combined Fleet and won several naval battles against the Chinese Empire's Beiyang Fleet led by Admiral Ding Ruchang, notably at the Battle of the Yellow Sea. During that battle, his flagship Matsushima took a direct hit from the main guns of the Chinese ironclad Zhenyuan and suffered severe damage. Itō ordered the ship turned to fight from its undamaged side, then transferred his flag to Hashidate once Matsushima's ability to function as a flagship was compromised.

Following the fall of Lüshun, the remaining Beiyang Fleet withdrew to Weihai, where it made its last stand. Admiral Ding Ruchang chose suicide over surrender ahead of the fleet's capitulation in February 1895. Itō had Ding's body returned with dignity, setting aside the captured merchant ship Kangji from among the fleet's seized ships for that purpose rather than have the body transported home on an ordinary vessel. Popular accounts add that he justified the decision to reluctant subordinates by asking whether they would want his own body carried home in a rowboat were their positions reversed, though the exact wording of that exchange is not independently verified. The release of the Kangji itself was reported at the time by The Times and was noted internationally as an act of chivalry toward a defeated enemy.

On 11 May 1895, Itō became Chief of the Imperial Japanese Navy General Staff, and was ennobled with the title of shishaku (viscount) on 5 August 1898 under the kazoku peerage system. He was promoted to full admiral on 28 September 1898.

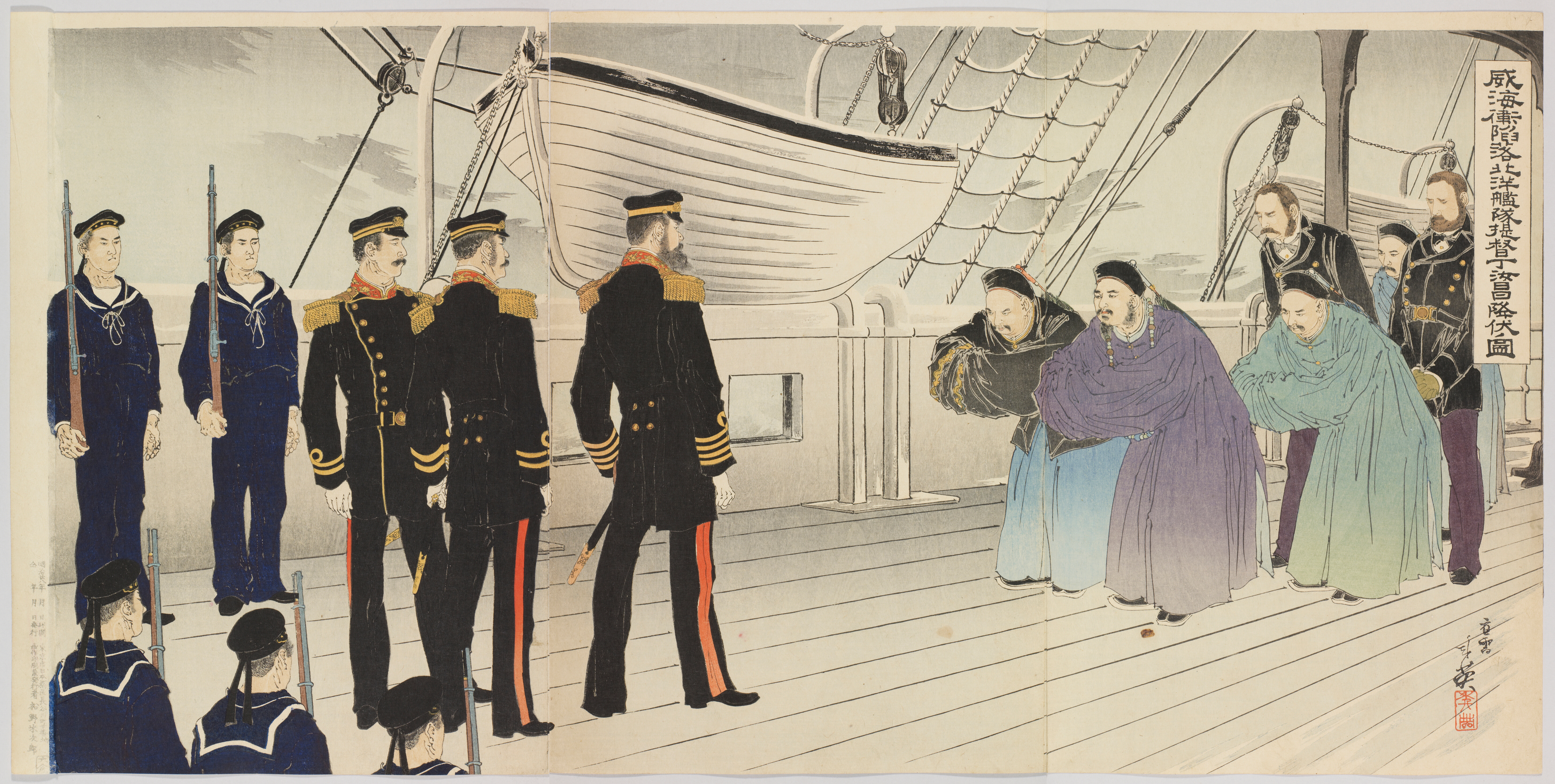
Ukiyo-e print by Toshihide Migita depicting Admiral Itō accepting the surrender of Chinese forces after the Battle of Weihaiwei, dated November 1895

During the Russo-Japanese War he continued to serve as head of the Navy General Staff, a post he held for more than ten years in total, the longest tenure of anyone to hold that office. After the war ended in 1905, he was made marshal admiral in 1906, and his title of nobility was raised to that of hakushaku (count) in 1907. At the same time, he was awarded the Order of the Golden Kite (1st class) and the Grand Cordon of the Supreme Order of the Chrysanthemum.

Itō took no part in politics and was not among the formally recognized genrō, though contemporaries sometimes grouped him with them informally. Subordinates called him "Thunder God Commander" for his strict discipline, and separately recalled him as generous off duty and fond of rice wine, which he called "rice soup."

Itō died in 1914. His grave is at the temple of Kaian-ji in Shinagawa, Tokyo.

Military offices
Preceded by Aiura Yorimichi	Small Standing Fleet; Commander-in-chief; 17 June 1886 – 17 May 1889	Succeeded by Inoue Yoshika
Preceded by Inoue Yoshika	Naval War College; Headmaster; 15 May 1889 – 24 September 1890	Succeeded by Abo Kiyoyasu
Preceded by Akamatsu Noriyoshi	Yokosuka Naval District; Commander-in-chief; 12 December 1892 – 20 May 1893	Succeeded by Inoue Yoshika
Preceded by Aiura Yorimichi	Standing Fleet; Commander-in-chief; 20 May 1893 – 11 May 1895	Succeeded by Arichi Shinanojō
Fleet Created	Combined Fleet; Commander-in-chief; 18 July 1894 – 11 May 1895	Succeeded by Arichi Shinanojō
Preceded by Kabayama Sukenori	Navy General Staff; Chairman; 11 May 1895 – 20 December 1905	Succeeded by Tōgō Heihachirō
