= Ding Ruchang =

Chinese admiral

Ding Ruchang 丁汝昌
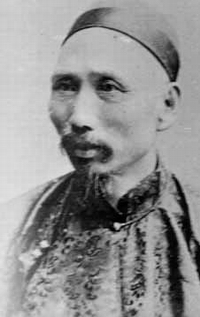
- Admiral Ding Ruchang
- Born: 18 November 1836; Anhui, Qing China
- Died: 12 February 1895 (aged 58); Liugong Island, Shandong, Qing China
- Military career
- Allegiance: Taiping Heavenly Kingdom (1854–1861); Qing Dynasty (1875–1895)
- Branch: Beiyang Fleet
- Service years: 1854–1895
- Rank: Admiral
- Conflicts: Taiping Rebellion; Nian Rebellion; Imo Incident; Sino-French War; First Sino-Japanese War; Battle of Yalu River; Battle of Weihaiwei †

Admiral Ding Ruchang (Chinese: 丁汝昌; pinyin: Dīng Rǔchāng; Wade–Giles: Ting Ju-ch'ang; 18 November 1836 – 12 February 1895), courtesy name Yuting (禹廷 or 雨亭), art name Cizhang (次章), was a Chinese admiral of the Qing dynasty.

Ding took part in the First Sino-Japanese War. He lost five of the ten ships in his fleet during the Battle of the Yalu River (1894). During the subsequent Battle of Weihaiwei (1895), Ding refused offers of political asylum by the Japanese admiral Itō Sukeyuki. Instead of surrendering, Ding committed suicide by an overdose of opium in his office at his Liugong Island headquarters.

After his death, Ding was blamed by the Qing government for the defeat, and posthumously stripped of all ranks and positions. He was posthumously rehabilitated and restored to all of his ranks by the Qing imperial court in 1910.

== Early life ==
Ding was a native of what is now part of Chaohu City in Anhui Province, China. He joined the Taiping Rebellion in 1854, but he later surrendered with Cheng Xueqi in the Battle of Anqing in 1861, and defected to the imperial cause. He joined Li Hongzhang’s Huai Army as a cavalryman to help suppress the Taiping Rebellion, serving with Liu Mingchuan. Afterwards, he was active in helping suppress the Nian Rebellion, and was awarded with the equivalent in rank to colonel. In 1874, he protested against the Qing dynasty government's decision about reduction of the army size. He went back to his hometown to avoid being killed.

== Self-strengthening movement ==
In 1875, Li Hongzhang recruited Ding to be a commander of the Beiyang Fleet, the most modern of China's regional navies. In 1880, he travelled to Newcastle upon Tyne in Great Britain to accept delivery of the cruiser Chaoyun where he was photographed by Newcastle-based photographer H.S. Mendelssohn. He also visited Germany and France to familiarize himself with their shipbuilding techniques. Ding was a supporter of the Self-Strengthening Movement in China, and urged Li Hongzhang to create shipyards in China able to build modern armored cruisers, rather than relying on foreign imports. Ting took an active role in the creation of the naval bases at Weihaiwei and Lushunkou.

In 1882, Ding was an observer during the negotiations resulting in the normalization of trade between Korea and the United States. He later helped suppress the Imo rebellion, with his marines arresting Heungseon Daewongun, the father of King Gojong, after arriving at Incheon with a fleet of seven ships.

During the Sino-French War of 1884, Ding was awarded the Yellow Riding Jacket by the Qing Emperor, traditionally the highest military awards in the Qing Empire.

== Nagasaki incident ==
In 1886, Ding participated in a show of force, with the Beiyang Fleet touring Hong Kong, the Japanese port of Nagasaki, the Korean ports of Busan and Wonsan, and the Russian naval base of Vladivostok. While in Nagasaki on 13 August 1886, a number of drunken sailors from Zhenyuan became involved in a brawl in a local brothel, during which a Japanese police officer was fatally stabbed. In what came to be called the Nagasaki incident two days later in a riot between locals, police and Ding's sailors, six sailors were killed and 45 wounded, along with five Japanese policemen killed and 16 wounded. The riot resulted in a diplomatic incident, but Ding was able to make a second trip to Japan with the Beiyang Fleet in 1891.

Ding was promoted to admiral and commander of the Beiyang Fleet from 1888 to 1894, and was promoted to the position of vice naval minister in 1894.

== Sino-Japanese War ==
During the First Sino-Japanese War of 1894–95, Ding pushed for a direct confrontation with the Imperial Japanese Navy, but was ordered by Beijing not to operate east of the mouth of the Yalu River, for fear that China's prized modern warships would be damaged or destroyed. However, this is what happened at the Battle of the Yalu River on 17 September 1894, during which Ding lost five of the ten ships in his fleet. He also became a casualty of the battle from the opening shot of his own vessel, Dingyuan, which had a construction defect, along with a number of officers also present on the bridge. An alternative theory is that the incident occurred due to the deliberate misfiring of the ship's main battery by the commanding captain.

=== Death ===
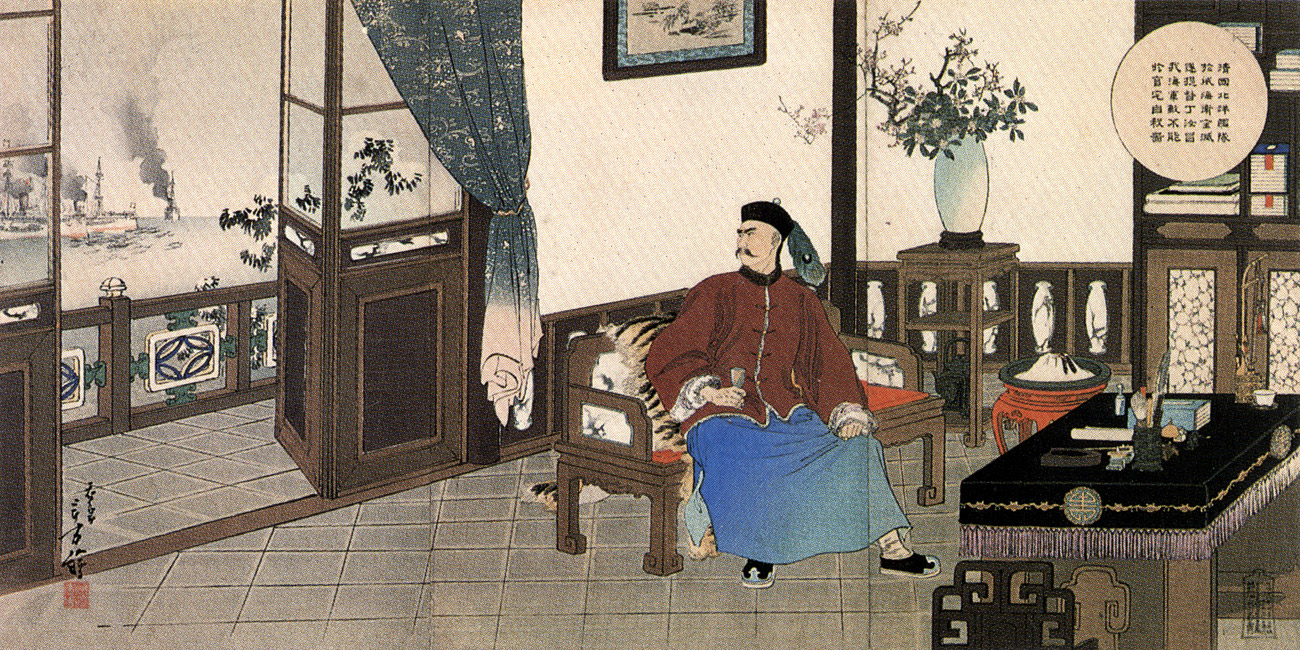
The suicide of Admiral Ding Ruchang (print by Mizuno Toshikata)

During the Battle of Lushunkou, Ding was ordered to withdraw his ships to the safety of Weihaiwei without giving battle to the Japanese. During the subsequent Battle of Weihaiwei, his ships were kept within the protective confines of the harbor, but the situation proved hopeless once the Imperial Japanese Army had seized the shore fortifications and lowered the boom enclosing the harbor to permit attacks by Japanese torpedo boats. Ding refused offers of political asylum by Japanese admiral Itō Sukeyuki and committed suicide by an overdose of opium in his office at his Liugong Island headquarters. His deputy, Admiral Liu Buchan, after ordering that his warship be scuttled by explosives, also committed suicide. The remnants of the Beiyang Fleet surrendered to the Japanese.

After his death, Ding was blamed by the Qing government for the defeat, and posthumously stripped of all ranks and positions. However, the manner of his death earned him the respect of the Japanese as well as of many members of the Chinese military. At the request of surviving generals in 1911, he was restored to all of his ranks, and his family was able to give him a proper burial in 1912 after the Xinhai Revolution overthrew the Qing dynasty.
