= Migita Toshihide =

Japanese artist

Toshihide Migita (右田 年英, Migita Toshihide; 1862 - 1925), also known as Oju Toshihide or Toshihide, was a Japanese artist, creating work in traditional ukiyo-e prints and painting in the Western syle.

Migita was apprenticed to Tsukioka Yoshitoshi. He also studied with Kinisawa Shimburō (1847–1877), who was an artist who had trained in Britain.

Among Toshihide's own pupils was Hirezaki Eihō, who studied ukiyo-e under him from 1897 before going on to study Maruyama-Shijō painting with the nihonga painter Kawabata Gyokushō in 1904; from 1901 to 1923, Eihō worked as an illustrator for the Asahi Shimbun newspaper, becoming known for his action sketches of sumo bouts.

Starting in 1877, his work was published in newspapers and magazines. His portraits of kabuki actors (yakusha-e) were well known.

His war prints (戦争絵, sensō-e), in triptych format are considered to be important historical documents. This work documents Japan's participation in the First Sino-Japanese War and the Russo-Japanese War.

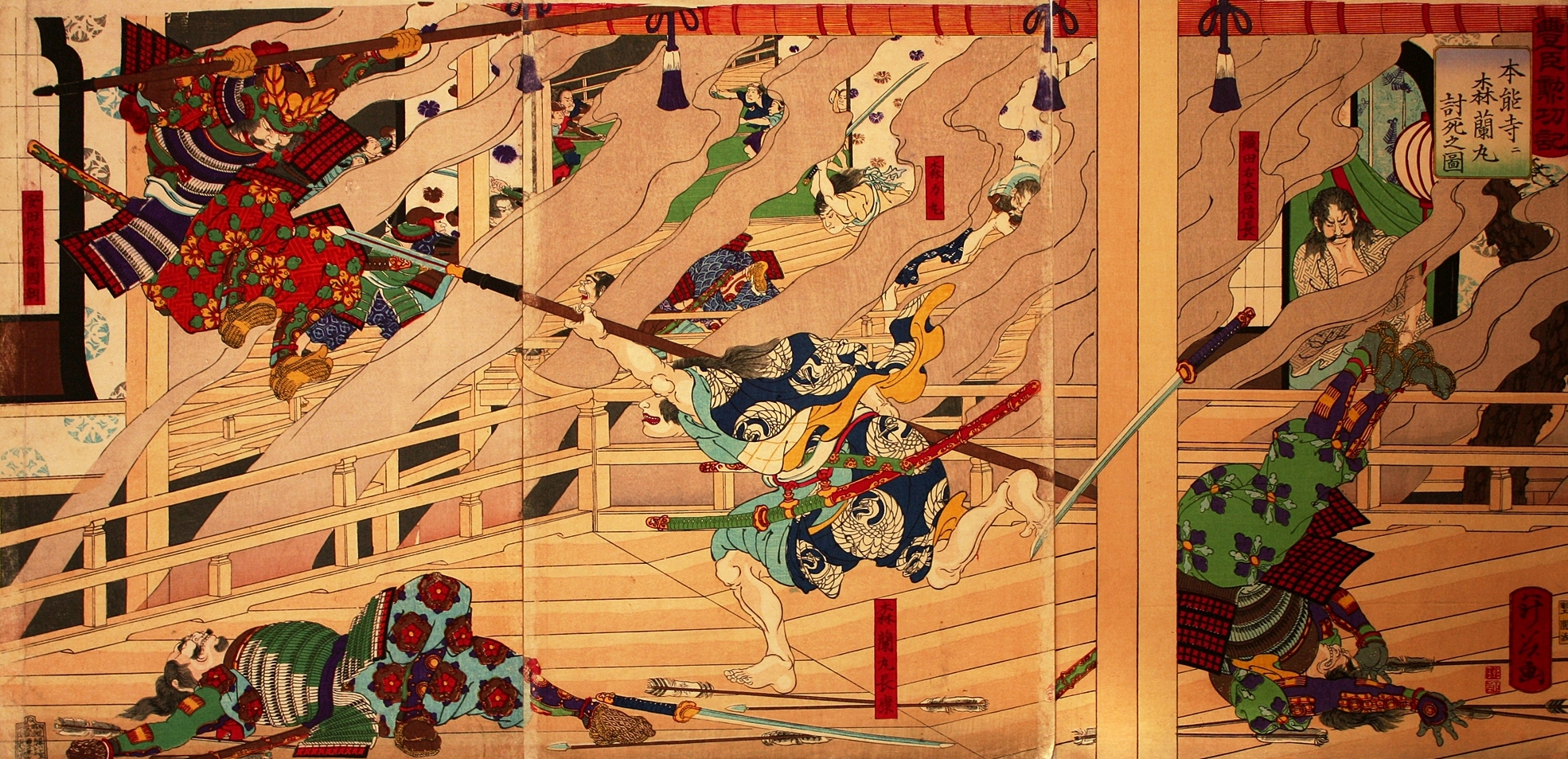
Mori Ranmaru killed at Honnō-ji, 1886

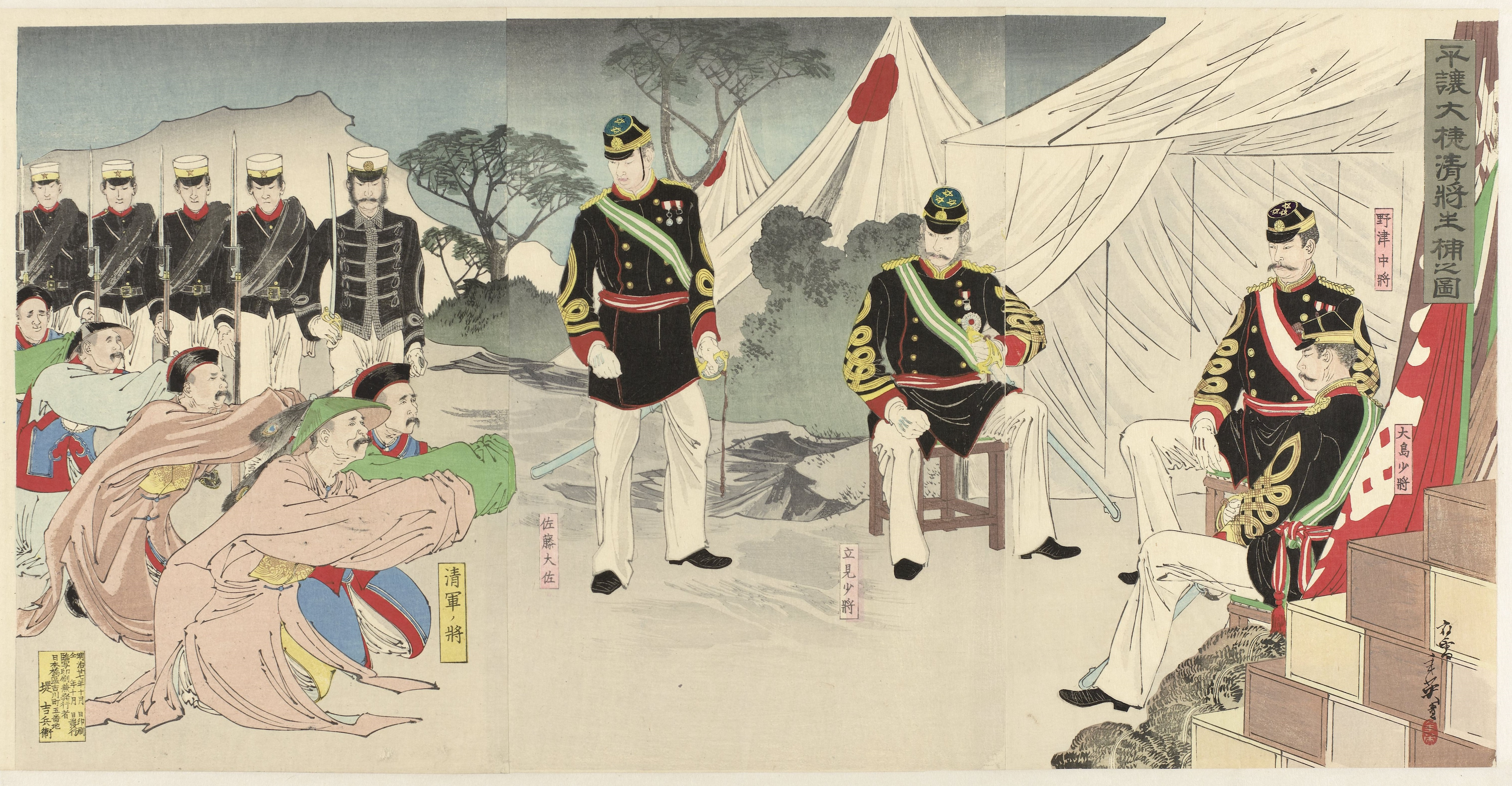
Illustration of Chinese Generals from Pyongyang Captured Alive, October 1894 Collection of Museum of Fine Arts, Boston

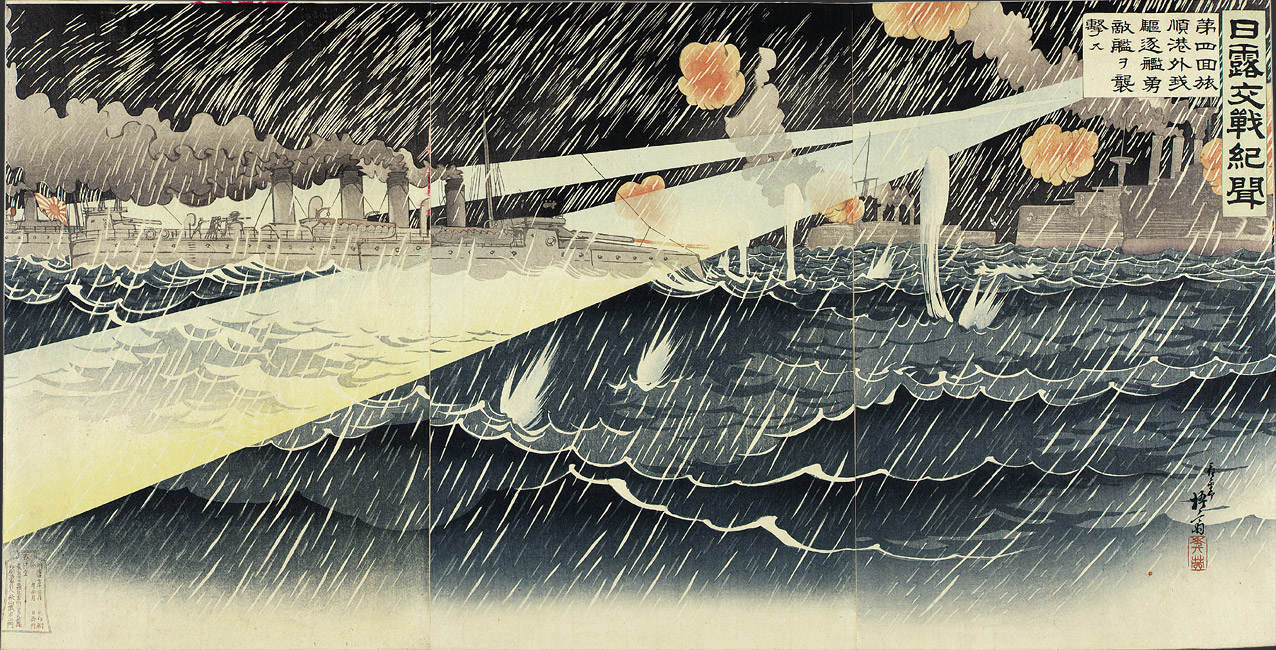
Japanese destroyers attacking enemy (Russian) ships at Port Arthur, March 1904

== See also ==
- War artists
