= Gustave Canet =

French artillery engineer (1846–1908)

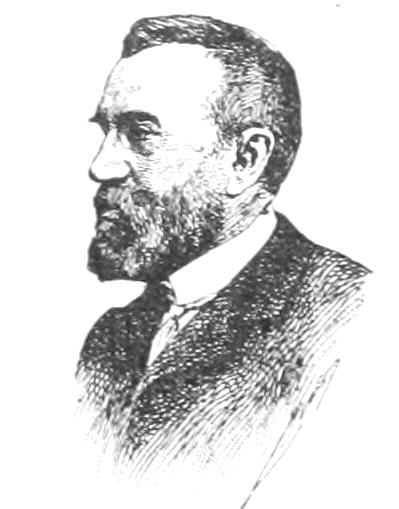
- Gustave Canet
- Born: Jean-Baptiste Gustave Adolphe Canet; 29 September 1846; Belfort, France
- Died: 9 October 1908 (aged 62); Saint-Aubin-sur-Mer, Calvados, France
- Education: École Centrale des Arts et Manufactures
- Occupations: Engineer, ordnance designer
- Employers: London Ordnance Works; Forges et Chantiers de la Méditerranée; Schneider et Cie
- Known for: Canet gun; hydraulic recoil brakes
- Awards: Commander of the Legion of Honour; Honorary member, American Society of Mechanical Engineers

Jean-Baptiste Gustave Adolphe Canet (French: [ɡystav kanɛ]; 29 September 1846 – 9 October 1908), known as Gustave Canet, was a French mechanical engineer and ordnance designer. He invented the Canet gun, a family of quick-firing naval, coastal, and field artillery systems widely exported in the late nineteenth century, and established the theory of hydraulic recoil brakes for guns.

Canet attended the École Centrale des Arts et Manufactures. He began his career in railway construction, served as an artillery officer in the Franco-Prussian War, and then learned gun-making in England at the London Ordnance Works. Starting in 1881, he created and directed the ordnance department of the Forges et Chantiers de la Méditerranée, and from 1897 he headed artillery design at Schneider et Cie of Le Creusot.

== Early life and education ==
Canet was born at Belfort on 29 September 1846. He completed his secondary schooling at the lycée of Strasbourg and entered the École Centrale des Arts et Manufactures in 1866, graduating as an ingénieur des arts et manufactures. On leaving the school he took up railway construction work in Alsace.

== Franco-Prussian War ==
Canet's railway work was interrupted by the Franco-Prussian War, in which he served as a lieutenant of artillery in the garde mobile of Haut-Rhin and took an active part in the defense of Neuf-Brisach. He was taken prisoner when the town surrendered. After the war he returned to railway engineering, working on the line from Delle to Porrentruy. His wartime service in the artillery, although brief, set the direction of his subsequent career.

== London Ordnance Works ==
French law at that time prohibited the export of weapons of war, and consequently gun and carriage manufacture was little developed in French private industry. Canet went abroad to learn the trade. In August 1872 he joined the London Ordnance Works, directed by Josiah Vavasseur, one of the leading British specialists in gun construction, where he received his practical training. By 1876 he had formulated the theory of hydraulic recoil control that afterwards became a general practice, together with new principles for the design of gun carriages and mountings.

== Forges et Chantiers de la Méditerranée ==
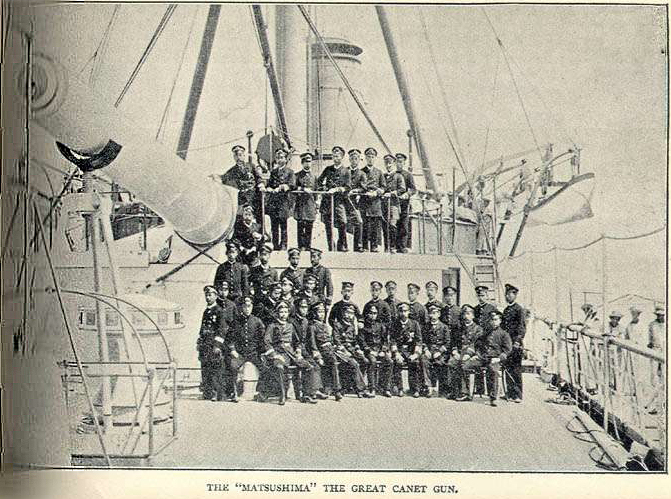
The Canet gun aboard the Japanese cruiser Matsushima

Canet left Vavasseur's firm in 1881 and joined the Forges et Chantiers de la Méditerranée to organize and direct an artillery department. He held that post until 1897. After 1885, when the manufacture of war materiel for export was authorized in France, his work assumed considerable commercial importance. He designed carriages, breech mechanisms and complete systems of artillery for field, coastal and naval service, and directed the construction of all-round-loading turrets with hydraulic and electric operation, as well as torpedo launching gear.

Warships armed with Canet's designs included the Japanese cruisers Itsukushima, Matsushima and Hashidate; the Greek ironclads Hydra, Spetsai and Psara; Spanish and Swedish vessels; and the French battleships Marceau, Jauréguiberry and Saint-Louis.

He was the first in France to build large-caliber quick-firing guns. His models of 10, 12 and 15 cm (3.9, 4.7 and 5.9 in) were shown in the War Ministry pavilion at the 1889 Exposition Universelle. From 1891 onward, he produced naval quick-firing guns attaining muzzle velocities above 1,000 m/s (3,300 ft/s) in service.

== Schneider et Cie ==
In 1897 Schneider et Cie of Le Creusot acquired the artillery works of the Forges et Chantiers at Le Havre and secured Canet's services. Canet was appointed director of the merged companies. In this period the Schneider–Canet system competed successfully against foreign rivals in most export markets. Canet retired in 1907 but remained a consultant to the Le Creusot works. Following the explosion aboard the battleship Iéna, he was appointed to the French commission on military powders.

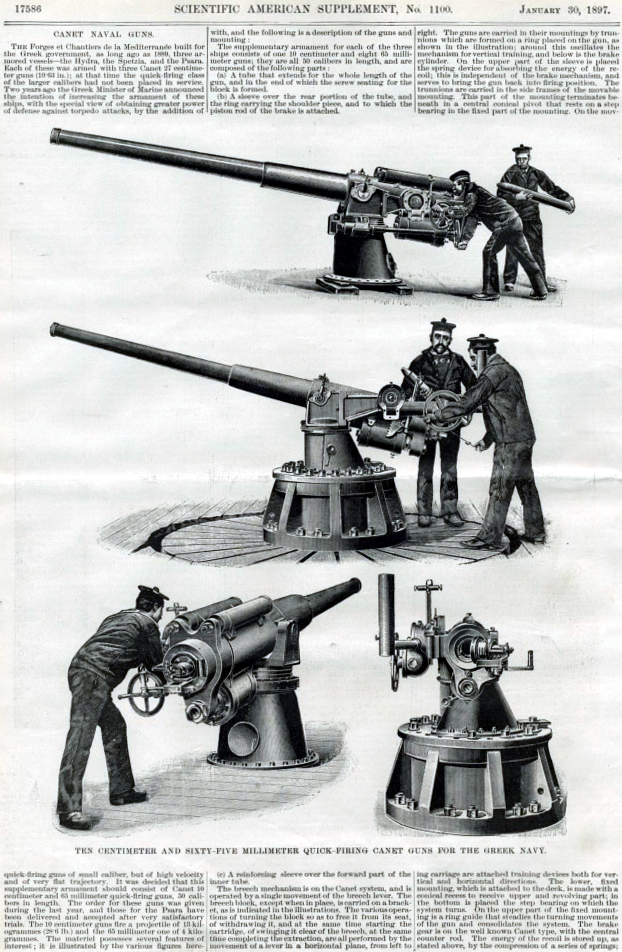
"SCIENTIFIC AMERICAN SUPPLEMENT No. 1100 January 30, 1897" from- Canet naval guns for the Greek ironclads (cropped)

== Professional activities and honors ==
Canet was president of the Société des Ingénieurs Civils de France, of the association of former students of the École Centrale, and of the French Association for the Protection of Industrial Property. He was an honorary member of the Iron and Steel Institute and of the Imperial Russian Technical Society, and at the time of his death was president of the Junior Institution of Engineers in London; his inaugural address there in November 1907 compared British and French artillery practice. He was elected an honorary member of the American Society of Mechanical Engineers in 1900. He was elected an Associate of the Institution of Civil Engineers on 5 February 1878 and transferred to the class of Member on 11 February 1908.

He was appointed a Knight of the Legion of Honour in 1886, an Officer in 1894, and a Commander in 1907 on the recommendation of the Minister of War, and was also an officier d'Académie. Various foreign decorations were also conferred on him.

== Death ==
Canet died at Saint-Aubin-sur-Mer, Calvados, on 9 October 1908. His funeral was held on Monday 12 October. (Note: The obituary in the Minutes of the Proceedings of the Institution of Civil Engineers gives the date of death as 7 October 1908.)

The Junior Institution of Engineers commemorated Canet by the Gustave Canet Memorial Lecture and the Gustave Canet Medal.
