= Canet =

Canet or Cannet may refer to:

People:

- Albert Canet (1878 – 1930), French tennis player
- Guillaume Canet (born 1973), French actor and film director
- Gustave Canet (1846 - 1908), French mechanical engineer

Places:

Several communes in France:

- Canet, Aude, in the Aude département
- Canet, Hérault, in the Hérault département
- Canet-de-Salars, in the Aveyron département
- Canet-en-Roussillon, in the Pyrénées-Orientales département
- Cannet, in the Gers département
- Le Cannet, in the Alpes-Maritimes département
- Le Cannet-des-Maures, in the Var département

Several towns in Spain:

- Canet d'Adri, in the province of Girona
- Canet d'en Berenguer, in the province of Valencia
- Canet de Mar, in the province of Barcelona
- Canet lo Roig, in the province of Castellón

Other:

- CAnet, a high-speed research network in Canada
- Château Pontet-Canet, Bordeaux wine estate, originally named Canet
- Canet guns, weapons system developed by Gustave Canet
