= Matsushima-class cruiser =

Class of Japanese protected cruisers

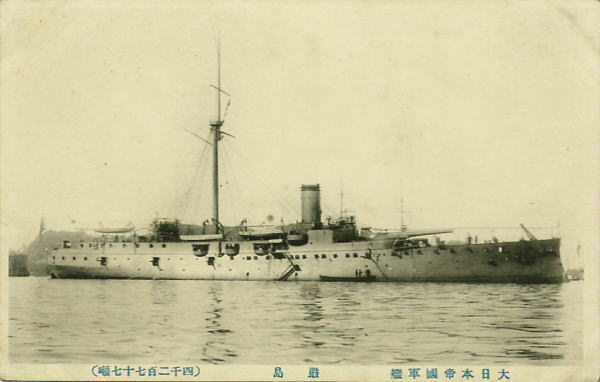
- Itsukushima, the lead ship of the Matsushima class

Class overview
- Name: Matsushima class
- Operators: Imperial Japanese Navy
- Preceded by: Naniwa class
- Built: 1888–1894
- In commission: 1891–1926
- Planned: 4
- Completed: 3
- Canceled: 1
- Lost: 1 (Matsushima)
- Retired: 2

General characteristics
- Type: Protected cruiser
- Displacement: 4,217 long tons (4,285 t) (Matsushima); 4,278 long tons (4,347 t) (Itsukushima and Hashidate)
- Length: 91.81 m (301 ft 3 in) w/l
- Beam: 15.6 m (51 ft 2 in)
- Draft: 6.05 m (19 ft 10 in)
- Propulsion: 2-shaft reciprocating; 6 boilers; 5,400 hp (4,000 kW), 680 tons coal
- Speed: 16.5 knots (19.0 mph; 30.6 km/h)
- Complement: 360
- Armament: 1 × 320 mm (12.6 in) Canet gun; 11-12 × QF 4.7-inch (120 mm) guns; 5-6 × QF 6-pounder (57 mm) Hotchkiss guns; 2-5 × QF 3-pounder (47 mm) Hotchkiss guns; 4 × 356 mm (14.0 in) torpedo tubes
- Armor: Deck: 50 mm (2 in); Gun turret: 300 mm (12 in); Gun shield: 100 mm (4 in)

The Matsushima class (松島型防護巡洋艦, Matsushima-gata bōgojun'yōkan) was a class of protected cruisers of the Imperial Japanese Navy (IJN), with three ships named after the three most famous scenic spots in Japan (nicknamed Sankeikan (三景艦, 'three-views ships')). The Matsushima class was a highly unorthodox design among cruisers of the 1890s, as each ship had a primary armament of a single massive 320 millimetres (13 in) Canet gun, resulting in a monitor-like appearance.

== Background ==
Forming the backbone of the Imperial Japanese Navy during the First Sino–Japanese War, the Matsushima-class cruisers were based on the principles of Jeune Ecole, as promoted by French military advisor and naval architect Louis-Émile Bertin. The Japanese government did not have the resources or budget to build a large battleship navy to counter the heavier vessels of the Imperial Chinese Beiyang Fleet; instead, Japan adopted the radical theory of using smaller, faster warships, with light armor and small caliber long-range guns, coupled with a massive single main weapon. The design eventually proved impractical, as the recoil from the huge cannon was too much for vessels of such small displacement, and reloading time on the cannon was impractically long; however, the Matsushima-class cruisers served their purpose well against the poorly equipped and poorly led Imperial Chinese Beiyang Fleet.

There were originally plans to build a fourth vessel in this class, and its cancellation due to concerns over the design was one of the factors that led to Bertin's resignation and return to France.

== Design ==
The Matsushima-class vessels had steel hulls with 94 frames constructed of mild steel, and a double bottom, divided into waterproof compartments, with the area between the bulkheads and armor filled with copra. The bow was reinforced with a naval ram. The vital equipment, including boilers and ammunition magazines, were protected by hardened steel armor, as were the gun shields. The main armament consisted of one breech-loading 320-millimetre (12.6 in) Canet gun mounted in the bow of the ship (or in the stern in the case of Matsushima), which could fire 450-kilogram (990 lb) armor-piercing or 350-kilogram (770 lb) explosive shells at an effective range of 8,000 metres (8,700 yd). The maximum rate of fire was two rounds per hour, and the ship carried 60 rounds. Secondary armament consisted of QF 4.7 inch Gun Mk I–IV Armstrong guns, with a maximum range of 9,000 metres (9,800 yd) and maximum rate of fire of 12 rounds/minute. Ten were mounted on the gun deck, five to each side, with the 11th gun located on the upper deck of the fantail on Itsukushima and Hashidate, whereas Matsushima has a 12th gun on the fantail. Each gun was equipped with 120 rounds. Tertiary protection was by QF 6 pounder Hotchkiss mounted in sponsons on the upper deck, with a maximum range of 6,000 metres (6,600 yd) and rate of fire of 20 rounds/minute. Each gun had 300 rounds. In addition, QF 3 pounder Hotchkiss were mounted at various locations, with range of 2,200 metres (2,400 yd), rate of fire of 32 rounds/minute, and 800 rounds per gun. Each ship in the class also had four 356-mm torpedo tubes, three in the bow and one in the stern, with a total of 20 torpedoes carried on board.

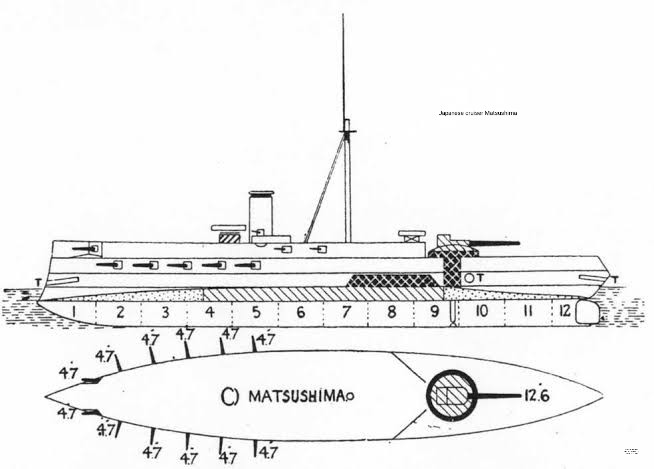
Imperial Japanese Navy Cruiser Matsushima JANE'S FIGHTING SHIPS 1906-07, Edi

Propulsion was by two triple expansion steam engines with six boilers, driving two shafts at a rated power of 5,400 hp (4,000 kW). Theoretical speed was 16.5 knots (19.0 mph; 30.6 km/h), which was seldom realistic in actual service.

== Ships in class ==
Itsukushima (厳島)

Built by the Société Nouvelle des Forges et Chantiers de la Méditerranée naval shipyards in France; launched on 18 July 1889; completed on 3 September 1891. Struck on 12 March 1926 and scrapped.

Matsushima (松島)

Built by the Société Nouvelle des Forges et Chantiers de la Méditerranée naval shipyards in France; launched on 22 January 1890; completed on 5 April 1892. Matsushima differed from her two sister ships in that the Canet gun was mounted abaft the superstructure, rather than forward. Sunk on 30 April 1908 after an accidental explosion while at anchor in the Pescadores islands off Taiwan, with the loss of 207 of her 350 crewmembers.

Hashidate (橋立)

The only ship of the class built in Japan, by the Yokosuka Naval Arsenal; launched on 24 March 1891; completed on 26 June 1894. Struck on 1 April 1922 and scrapped in 1927.

== Service life ==
All three ships of the Matsushima class were completed just prior to the start of the First Sino-Japanese War, and saw combat in the Battle of the Yalu River and the subsequent Battle of Weihaiwei.

During the Russo-Japanese War the three ships of the Matsushima class, by then hopelessly obsolete, were assigned to the 5th squadron of the reserve IJN 3rd Fleet, together with the equally outdated ironclad battleship Chin'en, under the command of Admiral Shichiro Kataoka. All were present at the blockade of Port Arthur, the Battle of the Yellow Sea, and the final Battle of Tsushima. Later assigned to the IJN 4th Fleet, all were part of the flotilla that provided protection for the Japanese invasion of Sakhalin.

== See also ==
- Japanese cruiser Akitsushima – originally planned as the fourth Matsushima-class cruiser, but eventually built to a different design
