= Japanese cruiser Hashidate =

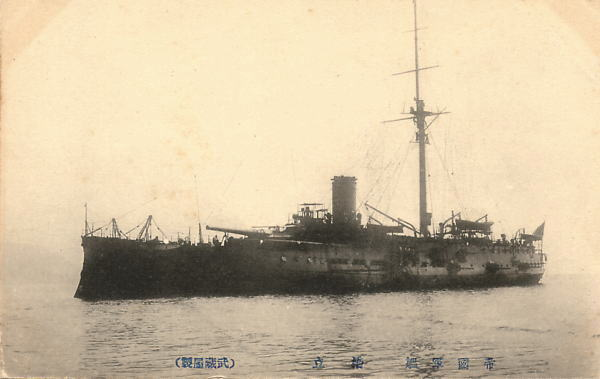
- Hashidate in a 1904 postcard.

History

Empire of Japan
- Name: Hashidate
- Ordered: 1886 Fiscal Year
- Builder: Yokosuka Naval Arsenal
- Laid down: 6 August 1888
- Launched: 24 March 1891
- Completed: 26 June 1894
- Stricken: 1 April 1922
- Fate: Scrapped 1927

General characteristics
- Class & type: Matsushima-class cruiser
- Displacement: 4,278 long tons (4,347 t)
- Length: 91.81 m (301 ft 3 in) w/l
- Beam: 15.6 m (51 ft 2 in)
- Draft: 6.05 m (19 ft 10 in)
- Propulsion: 2-shaft reciprocating; 6 boilers; 5,400 hp (4,000 kW), 680 tons coal
- Speed: 16.5 knots (19.0 mph; 30.6 km/h)
- Complement: 360
- Armament: 1 × 320 mm (12.6 in) Canet gun; 11 × QF 4.7 inch Gun Mk I–IV guns; 6 × QF 3 pounder Hotchkiss; 12 ×QF 1 pounder 5 barrel rotary Hotchkiss guns; 4 × 356 mm (14.0 in) torpedo tubes
- Armor: Deck: 50 mm (2 in); Gun Turret: 300 mm (12 in); Gun shield: 100 mm (4 in)

Hashidate (橋立, Standing Bridge) was the third (and final vessel) in the Matsushima class of protected cruisers in the Imperial Japanese Navy. The ship was the only one of the class constructed in Japan. Like sister ships, (Matsushima and Itsukushima) her name comes from one of the traditional Three Views of Japan, in this case, the Ama-no-hashidate in northern Kyoto Prefecture on the Sea of Japan.

== Background ==
Forming the backbone of the Imperial Japanese Navy during the First Sino-Japanese War, the Matsushima-class cruisers were based on the principles of Jeune Ecole, as promoted by French military advisor and naval architect Louis-Émile Bertin. The Japanese government did not have the resources or budget to build a battleship navy to counter the various foreign powers active in Asia; instead, Japan adopted the radical theory of using smaller, faster warships, with light armor and small caliber long-range guns, coupled with a massive single 320 mm (12.6 in) Canet gun. The design eventually proved impractical, as the recoil from the huge cannon was too much for a vessel of such small displacement, and its reloading time was impractically long; however, the Matsushima-class cruisers served their purpose well against the poorly equipped and poorly led Imperial Chinese Beiyang Fleet.

There were originally plans to build a fourth vessel in this class, and its cancellation due concerns over the design was one of the factors that led to Bertin's resignation and return to France.

== Design ==
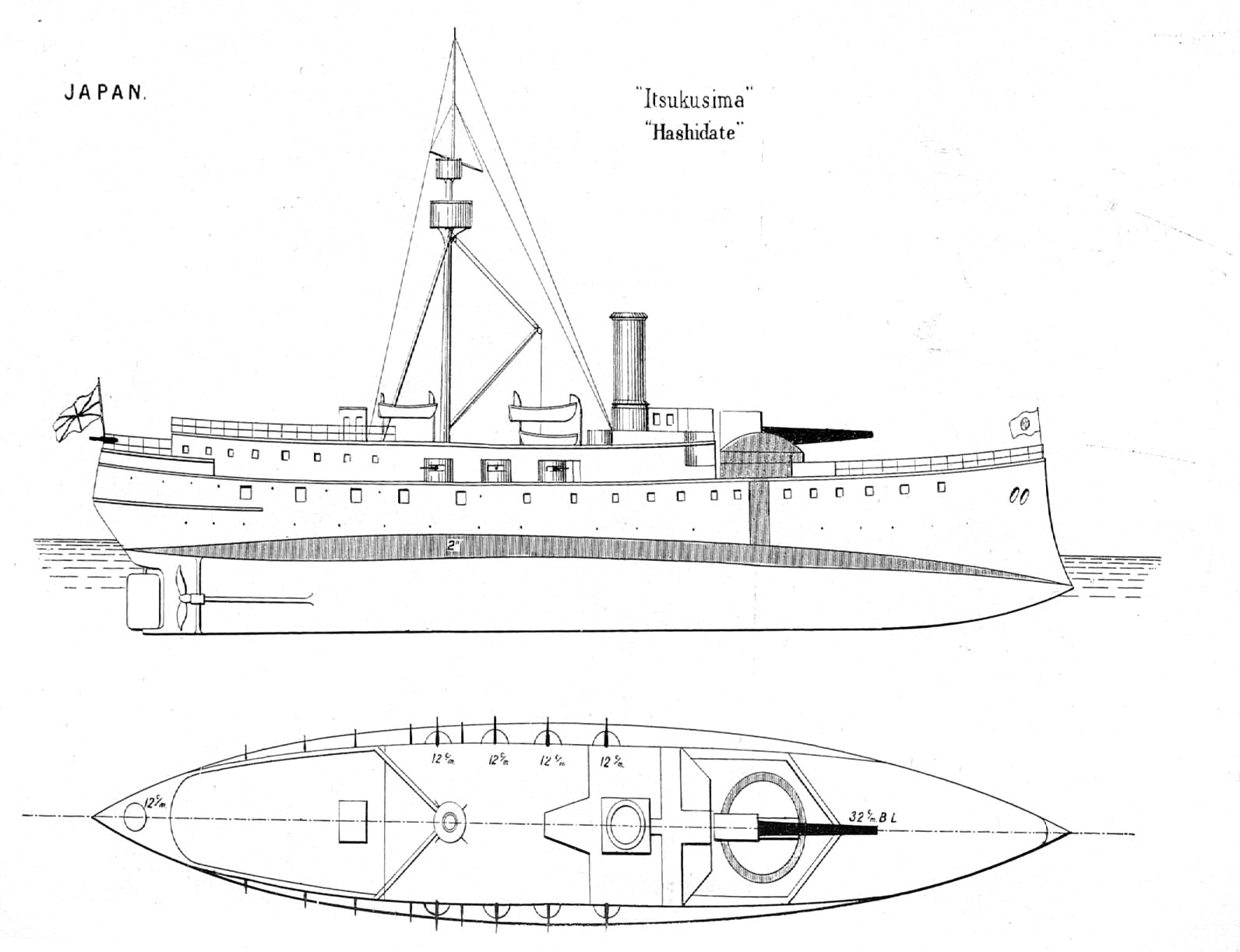
Armour and armament sketch of Itsukushima and Hashidate

Hashidate differed from her sister ship Itsukushima primarily in that her windows were rectangular instead of square, and in that she had a stronger engine.

As with Itsukushima, Hashidate had a steel hull with 94 frames constructed of mild steel, and a double bottom, divided into waterproof compartments, with the area between the bulkheads and armor filled with copra. The bow was reinforced with a naval ram. Vital equipment, including boilers and ammunition magazines, were protected by hardened steel armor, as were the gun shields. The main battery consisted of one breech-loading 320-mm Canet gun mounted in the bow of the ship, which could fire 450-kg armor-piercing or 350-kg explosive shells at an effective range of 8,000 metres (4.3 nmi). The maximum rate of fire was two rounds per hour, and the ship carried 60 rounds. Secondary armament consisted of eleven QF 4.7 inch Gun Mk I–IV Armstrong guns, with a maximum range of 9,000 metres (4.9 nmi) and maximum rate of fire of 12 rounds/minute. Ten were mounted on the gun deck, five to each side, with the 11th gun located on the upper deck of the fantail. Each gun was equipped with 120 rounds. Tertiary protection was by six QF 6 pounder Hotchkiss mounted in sponsons on the upper deck, with a maximum range of 6,000 metres (6,600 yd) and rate of fire of 20 rounds/minute. Each gun had 300 rounds. In addition, eleven QF 3-pounder Hotchkiss were mounted at various locations, with range of 2,200 metres (2,400 yd) and a rate of fire of 32 rounds/minute and 800 rounds per gun. Each ship in the class also had four 356-mm Schwartzkopff torpedo tubes, three in the bow and one in the stern, with a total of 20 torpedoes carried on board. The weight of all of this weaponry made the design dangerously top-heavy, and armor was sacrificed in an effort to reduce weight.

The ship was driven by two horizontal triple expansion steam engines. However, as the design had problems with seaworthiness, it was seldom able to attain its design speed of 16.5 knots in operation.

== Service life ==
Hashidate was built by the Yokosuka Naval Arsenal, with many materials imported from overseas. Due to the inexperience of the builders, construction took three years. She was laid down on 6 August 1888, and launched on 24 March 1891 in the presence of Emperor Meiji. Sea trials were complicated by various issues with her boilers, and she was commissioned into the Imperial Japanese Navy on 26 June 1894 despite the fact that one of her boilers had yet to be repaired after having failed in testing.

=== First Sino-Japanese War ===
Hashidate was rushed into service just prior to the start of the First Sino-Japanese War and saw combat in the Battle of the Yalu River under the command of Commander Hidaka Sōnojō. Assigned in fourth place in the Japanese line of battle, after Matsushima, Chiyoda and Itsukushima, the shortcomings of her design soon became evident. During the battle, she was able to fire her Canet gun only four times, failing to hit any of the Chinese ships. After Matsushima was damaged, Hashidate became flagship for Admiral Itō Sukeyuki. During the battle, she suffered eleven hits, which killed three crewmen (including two officers) and wounded nine others.

Hashidate remained flagship after the battle, escorting Japanese forces for the Battle of Lushunkou and providing ground support against the land fortifications of Dalian harbor on 6/7 November. During the Battle of Weihaiwei on 30 January 1895 and again on 7 February, Hashidate bombarded the land fortresses guarding Weihaiwei harbor, and later entered the harbor itself to accept the Chinese surrender on 12 February.

=== Interwar years ===
Hashidate underwent repairs immediately after the end of the war to address her boiler issues; however, she was still unable to achieve more than 10 knots (19 km/h; 12 mph), and was downgraded to a 2nd class cruiser on 21 March 1898. She participated in large-scale naval maneuvers in April 1900 practicing the techniques of a naval blockade in Yokosuka harbor. However, she was withheld from participation in the expeditionary force against the Boxer Rebellion in 1900 due to issues again with her boilers.

On 25 February 1901, Hashidate, and Itsukushima departed Yokosuka on a long-distance navigational training exercise which took them to Manila, Batavia, Hong Kong, Chelumpo, Pusan, Gensan, and Vladivostok, returning to Yokosuka on 14 August 1901.

In 1902, her six boilers were completely replaced by eight Japanese-designed Miyabara Water-tube boilers, becoming the first ship in the Japanese navy to receive this upgrade. In speed trials, on 20 October 1902, she was able to attain a speed of 16 knots (30 km/h; 18 mph), which she had never been able to attain before, even when new. Also during this overhaul, her secondary armament was replaced by two 76-mm guns and 18 QF 3-pounder Hotchkiss 47-mm guns. She then repeated her 1901 training cruise again in 1903.

=== Russo-Japanese War ===
During the Russo-Japanese War, the obsolete Hashidate (under the command of Captain Katō Sadakichi) and her sister ships were assigned to the 5th squadron of the reserve IJN 3rd Fleet, together with the equally outdated ironclad battleship Chin'en under the command of Admiral Kataoka Shichirō. She was based at Takeshiki Guard District on Tsushima and patrolled the Korea Strait in February, and escorted transports of the Japanese Second Army to the Korean Peninsula through the end of May. Afterwards, she was part of the fleet at the blockade of Port Arthur, engaging the Russian cruiser Bayan on 9 July. While on patrol on 10 August, Hashidate was one of the first Japanese ships to spot the Russian squadron, leading to the Battle of the Yellow Sea. She was too far away during the first stage of the battle, but was able to open fire and pursue the retreating Russian ships to Port Arthur, albeit without any success. On 10 December, together with Itsukushima, she assisted the cruiser Akashi, which had struck a mine.

During the Battle of Tsushima, on 27 May 1905, Hashidate attacked the rear of the Russian formation, scoring hits on the cruiser Oleg, and later assisting in the sinking of the battleship Knyaz Suvorov and repair ship Kamchatka. During the battle, Hashidate was hit twice, wounding a midshipman and six crewmen.

Later assigned to the IJN 4th Fleet, Hashidate was part of the flotilla that provided protection for the Japanese invasion of Sakhalin from July–August 1905. Hashidate returned to Yokosuka Naval Arsenal for repairs on 20 October, and participated in a naval review in Yokohama on 23 October 1905 celebrating the Japanese victory in the war.

=== Final years ===
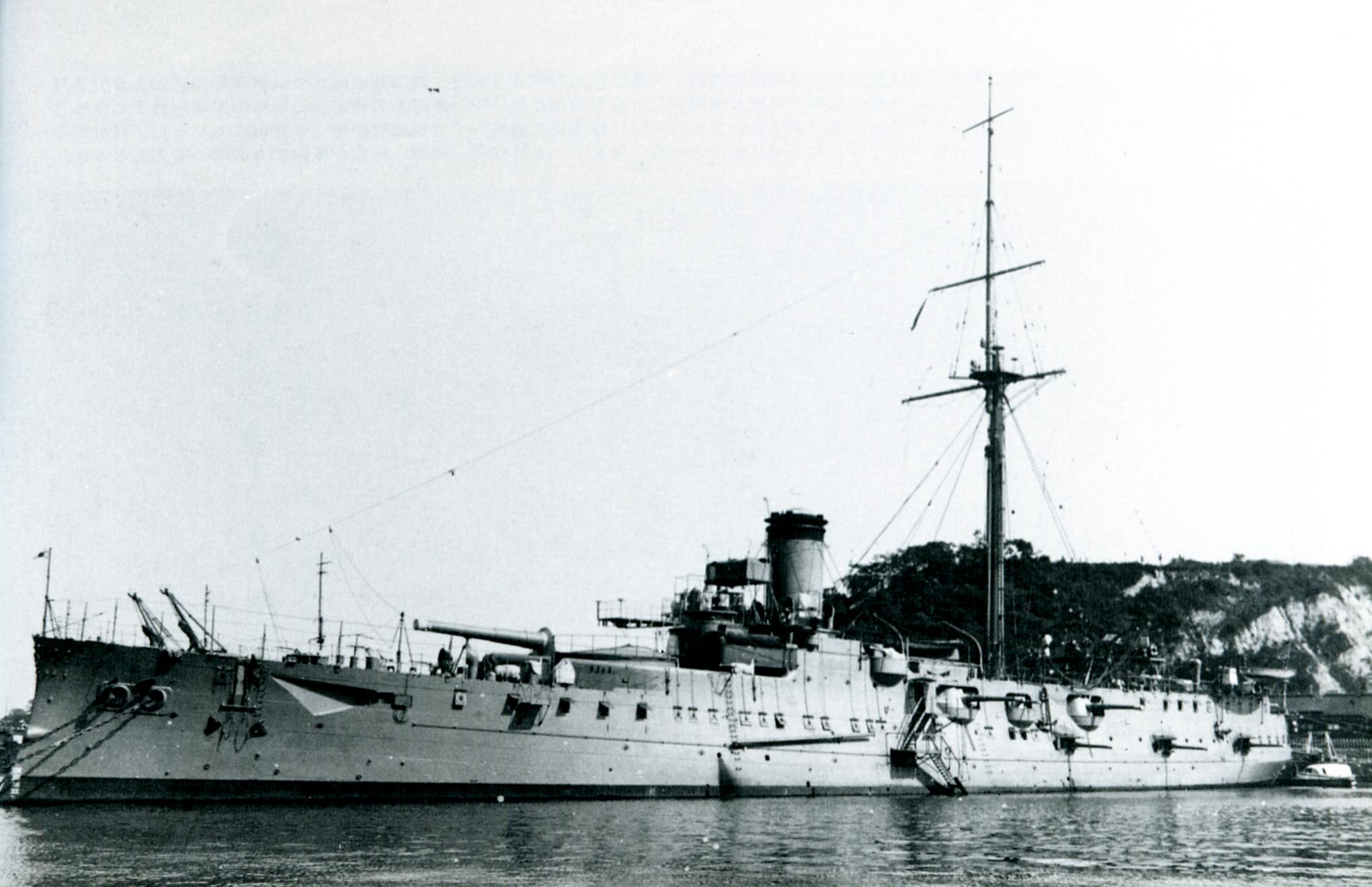
In 1916 at Yokosuka

After the end of the war, Hashidate was assigned again to be used as a long-distance navigational training vessel. She made training cruisers to Southeast Asia and Australia in 1906 and 1907, and made a voyage in 1908 to Hong Kong, Penang, Ceylon, Batavia, Manila and Taiwan. In 1909, her 47-mm guns were replaced by 76-mm guns.

On 28 August 1912, Hashidate was re-classified as a 2nd class kaibokan. She was struck from the navy list on 1 April 1922, and sent to the breakers in 1927.
