= Japanese cruiser Matsushima =

Imperial navy protected cruiser (1892–1908)

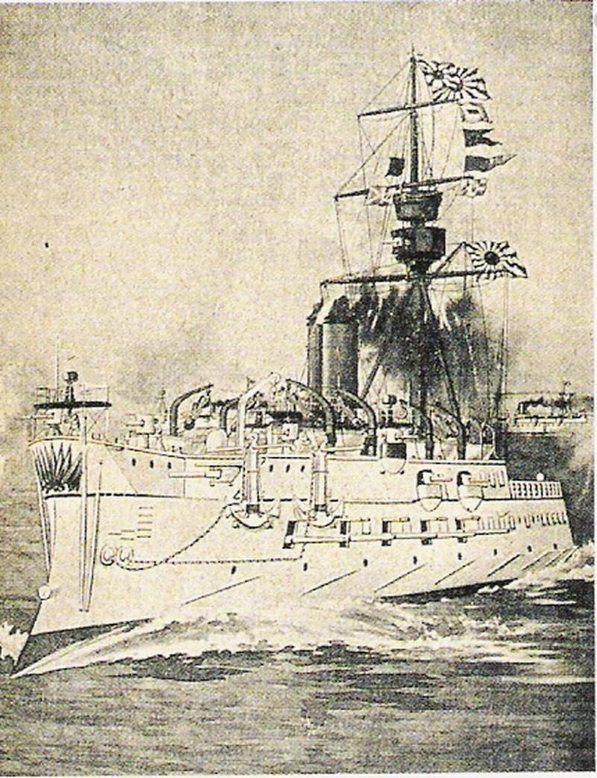
- Matsushima, flagship of the Japanese Navy in the Sino-Japanese War.

History

Empire of Japan
- Name: Matsushima
- Ordered: 1886 Fiscal Year
- Builder: Société Nouvelle des Forges et Chantiers de la Méditerranée, La Seyne-sur-Mer, France
- Laid down: 17 February 1888
- Launched: 22 January 1890
- Completed: 5 April 1892
- Stricken: 31 July 1908
- Fate: Sunk after accidental explosion 30 April 1908

General characteristics
- Class & type: Matsushima-class cruiser
- Displacement: 4,217 long tons (4,285 t)
- Length: 91.81 m (301 ft 3 in) w/l
- Beam: 15.6 m (51 ft 2 in)
- Draft: 6.05 m (19 ft 10 in)
- Propulsion: 2-shaft reciprocating; 6 boilers; 5,400 hp (4,000 kW), 680 tons coal
- Speed: 16.5 knots (19.0 mph; 30.6 km/h)
- Complement: 360
- Armament: 1 × 320 millimetres (12.6 inches) Canet gun; 12 × QF 4.7 inch Gun Mk I–IV guns; 6 × QF 3 pounder Hotchkiss; 2 × 5 barrel Hotchkiss rotary 1-pounder guns; 4 × 356 mm (14.0 in) torpedo tubes
- Armor: Deck: 50 mm (2 in); Gun Turret: 300 mm (12 in); Gun shield: 100 mm (4 in)

Matsushima (松島, Pine Island) was a Matsushima-class protected cruiser of the Imperial Japanese Navy. Like her sister ships, (the Itsukushima and Hashidate) her name comes from one of the traditional Three Views of Japan, in this case, the Matsushima archipelago near Sendai in Miyagi prefecture.

== Background ==
Forming the backbone of the Imperial Japanese Navy during the First Sino-Japanese War, the Matsushima-class cruisers were based on the principles of Jeune École, as promoted by French military advisor and naval architect Louis-Émile Bertin. The Japanese government did not have the resources or budget to build a battleship navy to counter the various foreign powers active in Asia; instead, Japan adopted the radical theory of using smaller, faster warships, with light armor and small caliber long-range guns, coupled with a massive single 320 mm (12.6 in) Canet gun. The design eventually proved impractical, as the recoil from the huge cannon was too much for a vessel of such small displacement, and its reloading time was impractically long; however, the Matsushima-class cruisers served their purpose well against the poorly equipped and poorly led Imperial Chinese Beiyang Fleet.

Matsushima was built by the Société Nouvelle des Forges et Chantiers de la Méditerranée naval shipyards at La Seyne-sur-Mer in France.

== Design ==
Matsushima differed from her sister ships primarily in the location of her main gun, which was situated behind the superstructure instead of in the bow.

Matsushima had a steel hull with 94 frames constructed of mild steel, and a double bottom, divided into waterproof compartments, with the area between the bulkheads and armor filled with copra. The bow was reinforced with a naval ram. The vital equipment, including boilers and ammunition magazines, were protected by hardened steel armor, as were the gun shields. The main armament consisted of one breech-loading 320-mm Canet gun mounted in behind the superstructure of the ship, which could fire 450-kg armor-piercing or 350-kg explosive shells at an effective range of 8,000 metres (8,700 yd). The maximum rate of fire was two rounds per hour, and the ship carried 60 rounds. Secondary armament consisted of twelve QF 4.7 inch Gun Mk I–IV Armstrong guns, with a maximum range of 9,000 metres (9,800 yd) and maximum rate of fire of 12 rounds/minute. Ten were mounted on the gun deck, five to each side, with the remaining two guns located in upper deck embrasures on either side of the bow. Each gun was equipped with 120 rounds. Tertiary protection was by six QF 6 pounder Hotchkiss mounted in sponsons on the upper deck, with a maximum range of 6,000 metres (6,600 yd) and rate of fire of 20 rounds/minute. Each gun had 300 rounds. In addition, eleven QF 3 pounder Hotchkiss were mounted at various locations, with range of 2,200 metres (2,400 yd) rate of fire of 32 rounds/minute and 800 rounds per gun. Each ship in the class also had four 356-mm torpedo tubes, three in the bow and one in the stern, with a total of 20 torpedoes carried on board. The weight of this weaponry made the design dangerously top-heavy, and armor was sacrificed in an attempt to lower the weight.

The ship was driven by two horizontal triple expansion steam engines. The seaworthiness of the design was poor, and the designed speed of 16.5 knots (30.6 km/h; 19.0 mph) was seldom possible.

== Service record ==
Matsushima arrived in Sasebo Naval District on 19 October 1892. As part of her shakedown cruise, from June to November 1893, Matsushima, Takachiho and Chiyoda made a 160-day, 7,000 nautical miles (13,000 km; 8,100 mi) navigational training cruise off the shores of China, Korea and Russia.

=== First Sino-Japanese War ===
After the start of the First Sino-Japanese War, Matsushima was the flagship of Admiral Itō Sukeyuki. She played a central role in the Battle of the Yalu River, as a part of the Japanese main body with Hashidate, Chiyoda and Itsukushima. During the battle, the shortcomings of her design soon became evident - she was able to fire her Canet gun only four times, knocking out one of the guns on the Pingyuan. During the battle, one of the 259-mm shells from Pingyuan struck Matsushima in her unarmored starboard side, destroying her torpedo tubes, and killing four crewmen, but the shell failed to explode. However, two of the 305-mm shells from the ironclad Zhenyuan also struck Matsushima. One failed to detonate, and passed through both sides of the hull. The other exploded, destroying the No.4 120-mm gun on the gun deck as it was being loaded, killing 28 crewmen and wounding 68 others. The fire from this explosion knocked three other guns out of commission, and only the quick action by a non-commissioned officer who stuffed his uniform into cracks in a bulkhead prevented the fire from spreading to an ammunition magazine. Matsushima also took numerous hits from smaller caliber artillery, damaging her smokestack, masts, and deck equipment, forcing her withdrawal from combat. In all, Matsushima lost 57 men (including three officers) and 54 wounded (including four officers) in the battle – more than half of the Japanese casualties during the entire battle. Admiral Itō was forced to transfer his flag to Hashidate as Matsushima returned to Kure Naval Arsenal for repairs.

With crews working around the clock, Matsushima was able to return to active duty after 26 days, participating in the Battle of Lushunkou and the Battle of Weihaiwei. While engaged in shore bombardment of the land fortifications of Weihaiwei harbor, Matsushima was hit by two shells from the defenders. One shell destroyed her chart house and damaged her smokestack, and the other exploded on her deck armor, wounding two crewmen. At the end of the battle, representatives from the Beiyang Fleet arrived on the deck of Matsushima to sign documents of surrender.

Matsushima was among the Japanese fleet units that took part in the invasion of Taiwan in 1895, and saw action on 3 June 1895 at the bombardment of the Chinese coastal forts at Keelung.

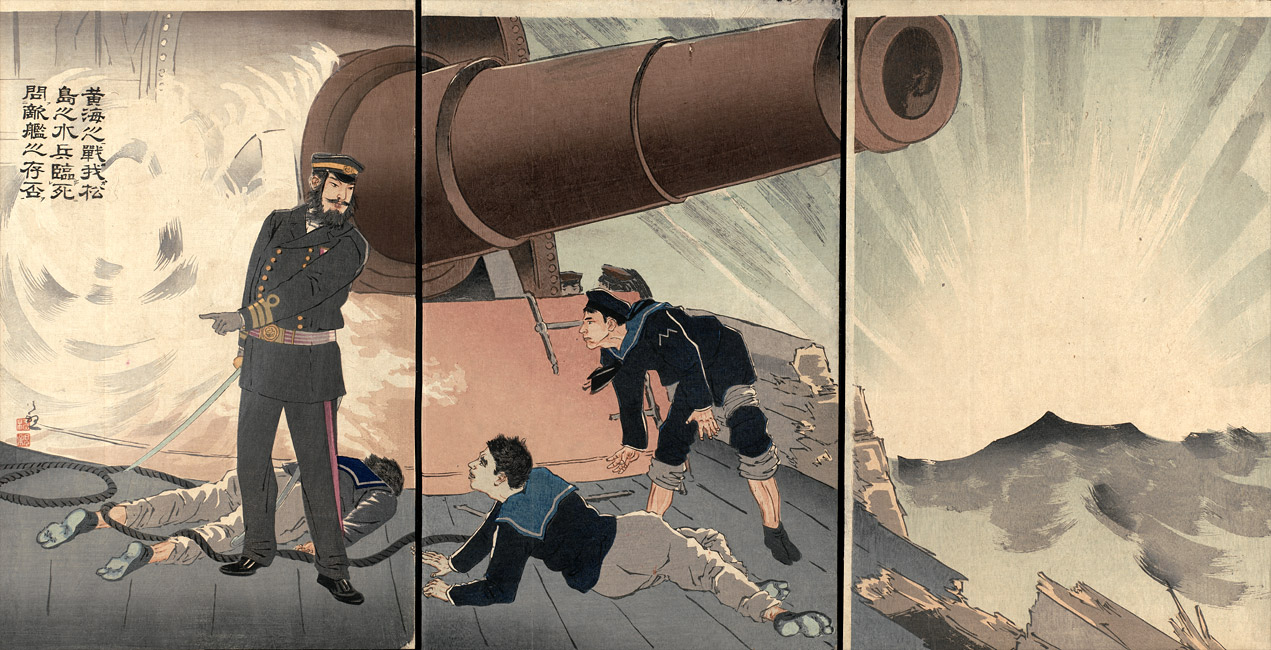
Matsushima in action, with her Canet gun. Kobayashi Kiyochika, 1894

=== Interwar years ===
Matsushima was among warships anchored in the Seto Inland Sea off Nagahama, Shikoku, Japan, when a strong gale struck on 29 October 1897. The central battery ironclad Fusōs anchor chain broke, and Fusō drifted across the harbor, collided with Matsushima's ram, then struck her sister ship Itsukushima before sinking in shallow water on a reef. Fusō later was refloated, repaired, and returned to service.

Matsushima was reclassified as a second-class cruiser on 21 March 1898. Prince Arisugawa Takehito was later appointed captain, followed by future admiral Uryū Sotokichi.

From 3 May 1898 to 15 September 1898, Matsushima was assigned to patrolling the sea lanes between Taiwan and Manila, during the period of heightened tension between Japan and the United States during the Spanish–American War.

In April 1900, Matsushima participated in large-scale naval maneuvers, and later that year escorted Japanese transports to China during the Boxer Rebellion. She underwent renovation at the Sasebo Naval Arsenal from February 1901, during which time her six boilers were replaced by eight more reliable Belleville boilers. Her smaller guns were also upgraded by replacement with additional 76-mm guns and 18 QF 3 pounder Hotchkiss 47-mm guns.

In 1902, Matsushima was dispatched to Minami Torishima, in an armed response to American claims that the island was American territory.

In 1903, Matsushima made the first of its long-distance navigational training voyages, visiting Southeast Asia and Australia.

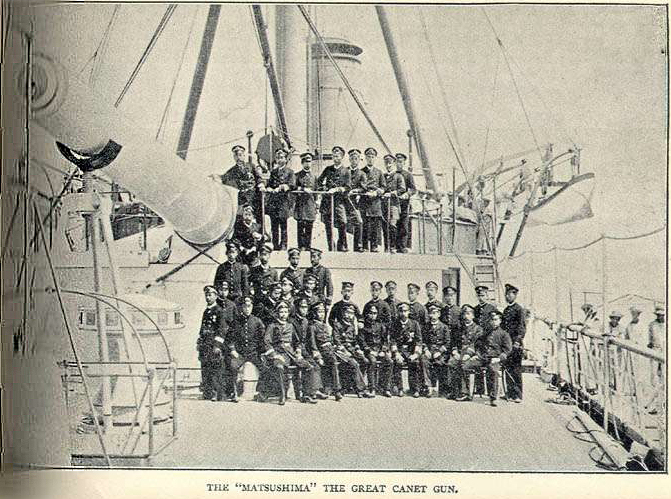
Officers of Matsushima.

=== Russo-Japanese War ===
During the Russo-Japanese War, the hopelessly obsolete Matsushima and her sister ships were assigned to the 5th squadron of the reserve IJN 3rd Fleet, together with the equally outdated ironclad battleship Chin'en under the command of Admiral Shichiro Kataoka. She was based out of the Takeshiki Guard District on Tsushima island for patrols of the Korea Strait in early February 1904. In May 1904, she assisted in the escort of transports carrying the Imperial Japanese Army 2nd Army, and at the end of the month was present at the blockade of Port Arthur.

During the Battle of the Yellow Sea of 10 August, Matsushima shadowed the Russian fleet, but was unable to close to combat distance. After the end of the Battle of Port Arthur, Matsushima was reassigned to Hakodate for patrols of the Tsugaru Strait. During this time, she captured the British-flagged steamship Istria with a cargo of contraband coal attempting to run the Japanese blockade into Port Arthur, but her capture was overturned in a Japanese prize court. On 28 February, she was briefly trapped in sea ice off of the island of Kunashir, but managed to break free, losing her right propeller and damaging some of her armor plating. She was repaired from March–April 1905 at the Sasebo Naval Arsenal.

At the final Battle of Tsushima, Matsushima was assigned to the 5th Division of the Japanese fleet. At the end of the first day of the battle, she was able to attack the cruisers Oleg and Aurora, but took a hit in return which damaged her steering and put her out of action until repairs could be completed. The following day, she covered the surrender of the remnants of the Russian fleet by Admiral Nebogatov. After the battle, she continued in patrols of the Korea Strait.

Later Matsushima was assigned as flagship of Admiral Dewa Shigeto in the IJN 4th Fleet, which was formed for the Japanese invasion of Sakhalin in July and August 1905. She was overhauled at Sasebo Naval Arsenal in September and October.

=== Final years ===
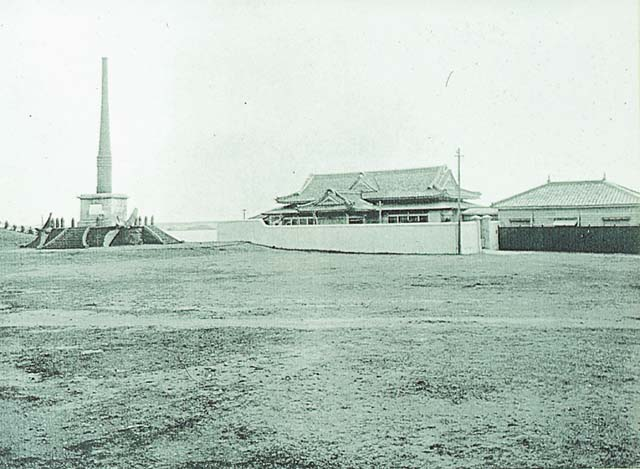
Original 1908 memorial to the cruiser Matsushima pictured. Modern park memorial in Magong City, Penghu County, Taiwan.

After the end of the war, Matsushima reverted to her former role as a training vessel, making long-distance navigational training cruises with Imperial Japanese Naval Academy cadets to Southeast Asia and Australia in 1906, 1907 and 1908.

On 30 April 1908, while anchored at Mako in the Pescadores islands off of Taiwan while returning from a training cruise, an accidental explosion occurred in her ammunition magazine. Matsushima rolled over onto her starboard side and then sank stern-first at 23°32′N 119°34′E. The accident killed 206 of her 350-member crew, including 33 midshipmen of the newly graduated 35th Class of the Imperial Japanese Naval Academy. She was struck from the navy list on 31 July 1908. Later, her wreckage was raised and scrapped.

A memorial to the Matsushima-class ships in general, and Matsushima in particular, is located at the temple of Omido-ji in Mihama, Aichi prefecture. The memorial contains one of Matsushima's 320 mm shells, weighing 450 kg, and standing 97.5 cm tall. There is also a modern park memorial to replace the 1908 memorial (pictured) in a Magong City park on the bay in Penghu County, Taiwan; near the spot where the ship went down.

== Gallery ==
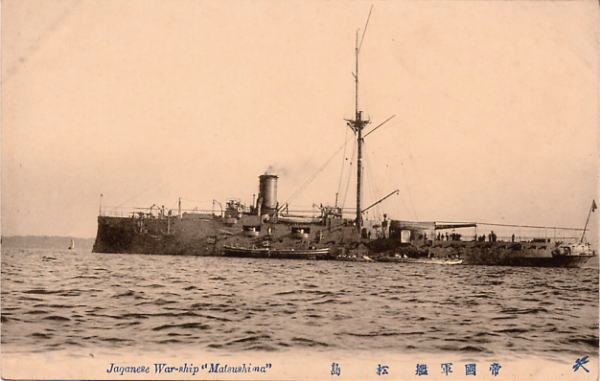
A 1905 post card

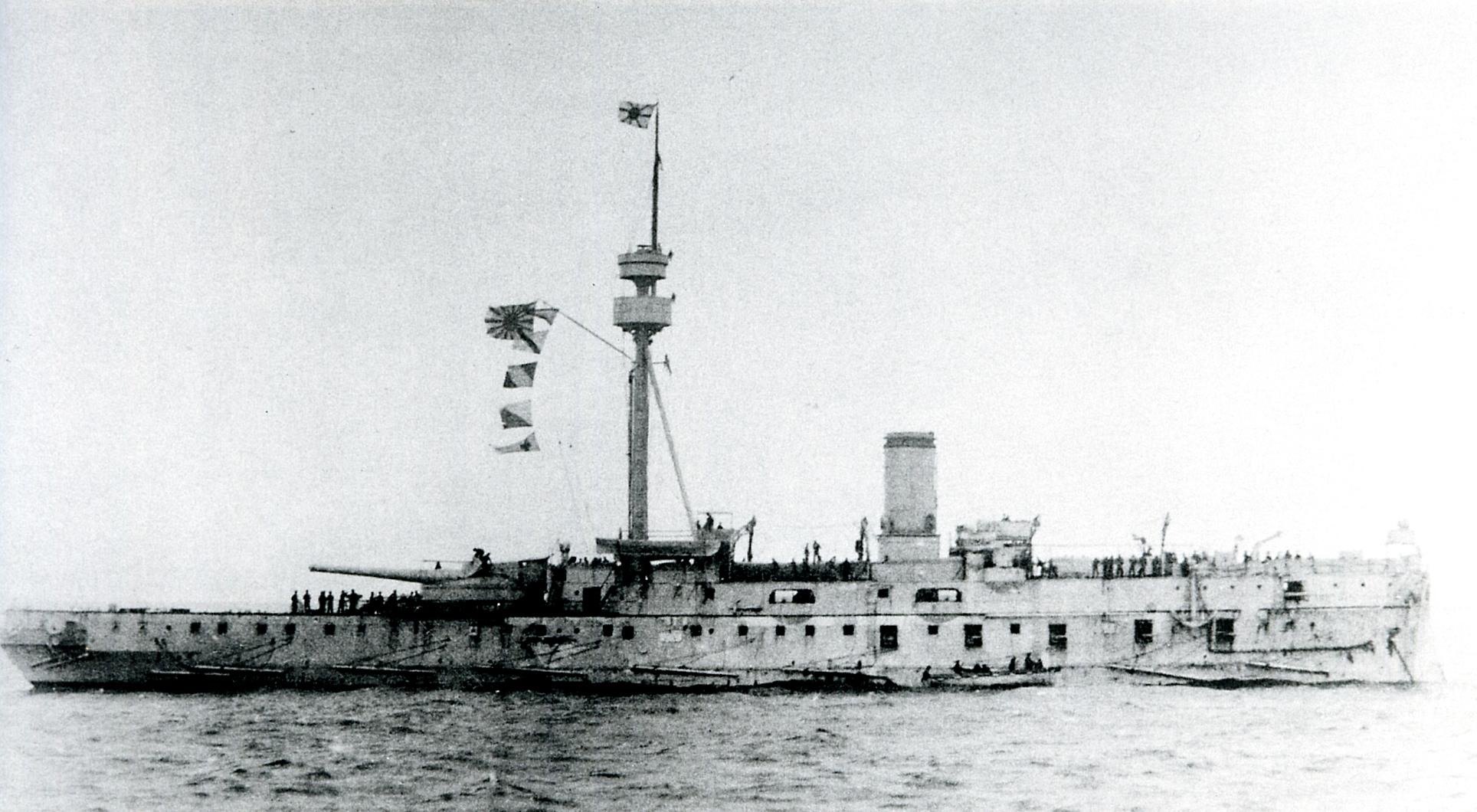
Off the Pescadores islands, 1895

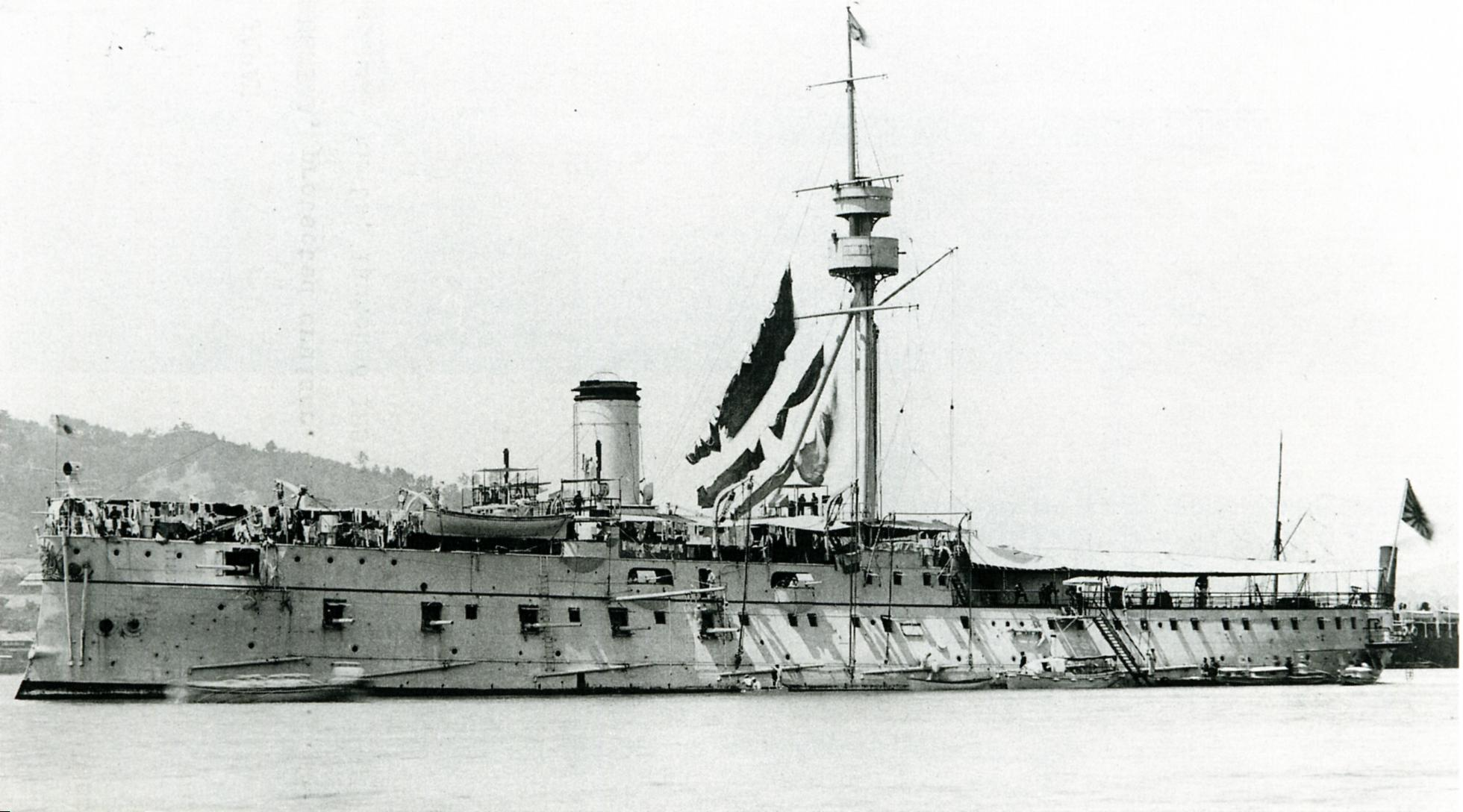
With parade pennants, 1896
