= Katō Sadakichi =

Imperial Japanese Navy officer (1861–1927)

Baron Katō Sadakichi
- 加藤 定吉
- Born: 19 December 1861; Edo, Japan
- Died: 5 September 1927 (aged 65); Tokyo, Japan
- Military career
- Allegiance: Empire of Japan
- Branch: Imperial Japanese Navy
- Service years: 1883–1923
- Rank: Admiral
- Commands: Akitsushima, Hashidate, Kasuga, Izumo, Kashima, Iwami, Maizuru Naval Arsenal, Training Fleet, Sasebo Naval Arsenal, Yokosuka Naval Arsenal, 2nd Fleet, Naval Education Bureau, Kure Naval District
- Conflicts: Boxer Rebellion; Russo-Japanese War; World War I

Baron Katō Sadakichi (加藤 定吉; 19 December 1861 – 5 September 1927), also known as Katō Teikichi, was an admiral in the Imperial Japanese Navy during World War I. His brother, Katō Yasuhisa, was a general in the Imperial Japanese Army, and his adoptive son was the biological son of Admiral Dewa Shigetō.

== Biography ==
Katō was born in Edo, as the third son of Katō Yasukichi, a hatamoto retainer of the Tokugawa shogunate. He attended the Numazu Military Academy, and in October 1883 graduated at the top of his class from the 10th class of the Imperial Japanese Naval Academy. One of his classmates was Yamashita Gentarō. He served as a torpedo officer on the Jingei, Takachiho and Hiei. With the opening of the Sasebo Naval District, he was appointed secretary to Admiral Akamatsu Noriyoshi.

From July 1891 to March 1893, Katō served as chief weapons officer on the cruiser Takao. He was then sent to Germany as part of the entourage of Prince Fushimi Hiroyasu. He remained with the prince in Germany through the duration of the First Sino-Japanese War. After his return to Japan, he served as weapons officer on the cruiser Itsukushima and on the staff of the Readiness Fleet.

In August 1897, Katō was assigned as secretary to Navy Minister Saigō Tsugumichi, who was soon promoted to fleet admiral. Katō was promoted to commander.

Katō returned to sea duty from December 1898 to April 1901, serving as executive officer on the cruisers Akitsushima and Kasagi. He then returned to Germany to oversee the completion of the cruiser Yakumo, and was executive officer on her voyage to Japan. From April 1901, he served with the Imperial Japanese Navy General Staff, where he enjoyed the confidence of Admiral Itō Sukeyuki. Katō met with business and political leaders, reviewed the designs of new warships, and was consulted on political developments and naval strategy. In October 1902, he was promoted to captain and returned to sea in April 1903 as captain of Akitsushima.

At the start of the Russo-Japanese War, Katō was captain of the cruiser Hashidate, an obsolete vessel not regarded as capable for front-line combat duties. However, in January 1905 he was transferred to command the cruiser Kasuga and was thus able to participate in the crucial Battle of Tsushima.

After the end of the war, Katō served for ten months in the Naval Personnel Department before returning to sea to captain the cruiser Izumo, followed by the battleships Kashima and Iwami. In May 1908, he became chief-of-staff of the Maizuru Naval District. He was then promoted to rear admiral, and spent the next three years as commandant of the Maizuru Naval Arsenal . In May 1911, Katō became commander of the Training Fleet and in April 1912 became commander of the Sasebo Naval Arsenal, followed in December 1912 by promotion to vice admiral and the post of commander of the Yokosuka Naval Arsenal.

In December 1913, Katō returned to sea as commander-in-chief of the Second Fleet. With the start of World War I, the IJN 2nd Fleet was deployed to the Siege of Tsingtao. At Tsingtao, Katō commanded a fleet of four battleships, two cruisers, 15 destroyers along with submarines, torpedo boats and other auxiliary vessels.

In July 1916, Katō was elevated to the kazoku peerage with the title of baron (danshaku). He was also awarded the Order of the Golden Kite, 2nd class and the Order of the Rising Sun. That December, he was appointed commander of the Kure Naval District and in July 1918 was promoted to full admiral. In December 1919, he was appointed a naval councilor and entered the reserves from January 1923.

As a naval councilor, Katō spoke out frequently in politics, and was a strong advocate of the “big guns and big battleships” clique within the Navy. Despite his experiences at Tsingtao, he derided the development of naval aviation as of only minor importance. Katō was especially vehement in his opposition to the Washington Naval Treaty and was thus a prominent member of the Fleet Faction within the Imperial Japanese Navy.

Katō collapsed while in a meeting with Prince Fushimi in September 1927 and died shortly afterwards.

== Bibliography ==
- Tucker, Spencer (2002). The Great War 1914-1918. London: Routeledge. ISBN 0-203-13755-8.

Military offices
Preceded by Ijichi Suetaka	2nd Fleet; Commander-in-chief; 1 December 1913 – 5 February 1915	Succeeded by Nawa Matahachirō
Preceded by Ijichi Suetaka	Kure Naval District; Commander-in-chief; 1 December 1916 - 1 December 1919	Succeeded by Murakami Kakuichi
