= Canon de 75 modèle 1905 Schneider =

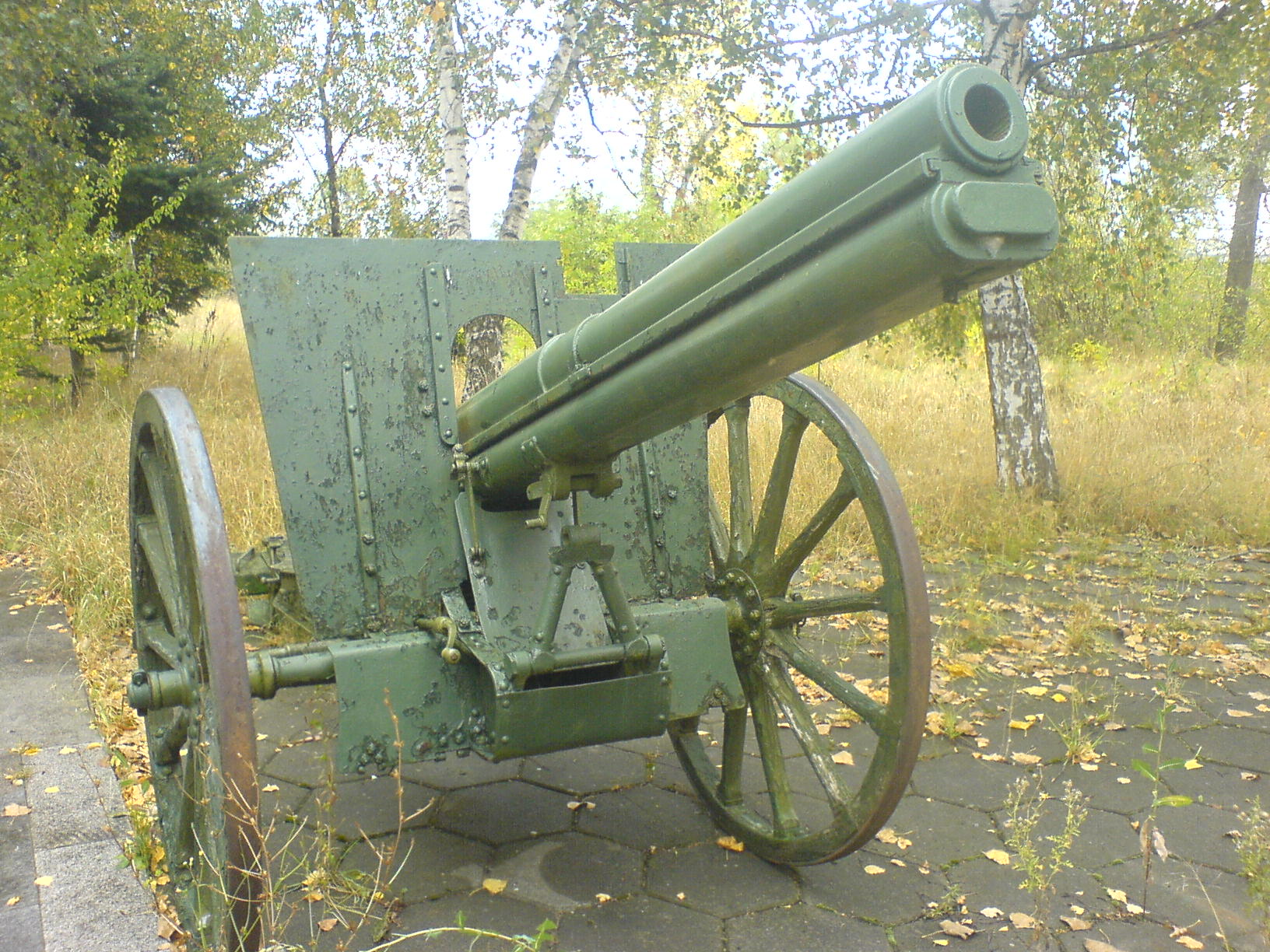
- Type: Field gun
- Place of origin: France

Service history
- In service: 1906–1945
- Used by: Bulgaria
- Wars: Balkan Wars; World War I World War II

Production history
- Designer: Schneider
- Manufacturer: Schneider

Specifications
- Mass: Combat: 1,017 kg (2,242 lb); Travel: 1,700 kg (3,700 lb)
- Barrel length: 2.4 m (7 ft 10 in) L/32 (L/26.5 was rifled)
- Shell: 6.5 kg (14 lb)
- Caliber: 75 mm (3.0 in)
- Breech: interrupted screw
- Recoil: hydro spring
- Carriage: solid trail
- Elevation: -5° to +16°
- Traverse: 6°
- Muzzle velocity: 500 m/s (1,640 ft/s)
- Maximum firing range: 8 km (5.0 mi)

The Canon de 75 modèle 1905 Schneider, factory designation Matériel de campagne à tir rapide de 75 mm, modèle 1903 PR (Puissant, système de récupération de recul à Ressort), Bulgarian designation "75-мм скорострелно полско оръдие “Шнайдер” образец 1904 год, was a field gun developed by Gustave Canet and used by Bulgaria during World War I and World War II. Some 324 had been delivered by the end of 1907 and most were still in service in 1939.
