= Japanese cruiser Chishima =

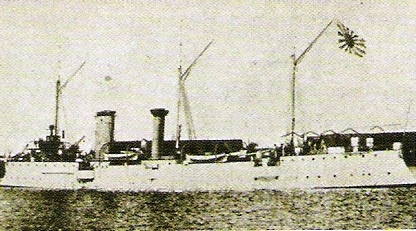
- Chishima in 1890

History

Empire of Japan
- Name: Chishima
- Ordered: 1887 Fiscal Year
- Builder: Ateliers et Chantiers de la Loire, France
- Laid down: 29 January 1890
- Launched: 26 November 1890
- Completed: 1 April 1892
- Commissioned: 24 November 1892
- Fate: Lost in collision, 30 November 1892

General characteristics
- Type: Unprotected cruiser
- Displacement: 741 long tons (753 t)
- Length: 71 m (232 ft 11 in) w/l
- Beam: 7.7 m (25 ft 3 in)
- Draught: 2.97 m (9 ft 9 in)
- Propulsion: Triple expansion steam engine, 2 screws; 5,000 hp (3,700 kW)
- Speed: 22 knots (25 mph; 41 km/h) nominal; 19 knots (22 mph; 35 km/h) actual
- Complement: 90
- Armament: 5 × 76 mm (3 in) guns; 6 × 37 mm (1.5 in) 1-pounder guns; 3 × 380 mm (15 in) torpedo tubes

Chishima (千島, Chishima) was an unprotected cruiser of the Imperial Japanese Navy. The name Chishima (lit. "Thousand Islands") is the Japanese name for the Kurile Islands. Chishima was used by the Imperial Japanese Navy as an aviso (dispatch boat) for scouting, reconnaissance and delivery of high priority messages.

== Background ==
Chishima was designed by French military advisor Émile Bertin, and built in the Ateliers et Chantiers de la Loire shipyards in Saint-Nazaire, France. It was part of the 1882 pre-First Sino-Japanese War expansion program of the Imperial Japanese Navy. In keeping with the Jeune Ecole philosophy of naval warfare advocated by Bertin, Chishima was small and lightly armed, so much so that sometimes Chishima has been confused with a torpedo gunboat or destroyer.

== Design ==
Chishima was a slightly older design, which included a full barque rigging with three masts for auxiliary sail propulsion in addition to her steam engine. Chishima was armed with two 76 mm (3 in) guns in sponsons on each side, with a fifth gun mounted in the bows. Secondary armament consisted of six 37 mm (1.5 in) 1-pounder guns mounted in pairs on the bridge, poop deck and one on each side. In addition, she carried five torpedo tubes, mounted on the deck.

== Service record ==
The commissioning of Chishima was delayed by over a year, as the ship could achieve only 19 knots (35 km/h), instead of the promised 22 knots (41 km/h); the French government agreed to pay the Japanese government some financial compensation for the issue. The shakedown cruise of Chishima was made on its voyage to Japan, with a crew of 80 Japanese and eleven French technicians, via Alexandria, the Suez Canal and Singapore. The ship suffered from numerous problems on this voyage, including boiler failure, leaks, and ruptured steam lines, before finally arriving at Nagasaki.

However, Chishima was lost only one week after its formal commissioning into the Japanese navy, in a night collision on 30 November 1892 with the British P&O merchant vessel Ravenna (3257 tons), off Matsuyama, Ehime prefecture, at 33°55′N 132°39′E in poor weather. The larger merchant ship struck Chishima amidships, cutting her into two. Her captain and 74 sailors on board drowned, but Ravenna suffered only minor damage. This incident led to the establishment of the Japanese "Maritime Anti-Collision Regulations".

One of the cannon of Chishima is preserved in a memorial at Aoyama Cemetery in Tokyo, and a memorial to the Chishima disaster with calligraphy by Tōgō Heihachirō is at the Buddhist temple of Jofuku-ji in Matsuyama.

== Litigation following sinking ==
In a maritime tribunal held by the British consular court in Kobe, P&O was cleared of any wrongdoing. The Japanese government subsequently brought legal action against P&O in the British Court for Japan. P&O responded by seeking to file a counterclaim, which the court's judge, Robert Mowat, rejected as not being within the jurisdiction of the court. P&O then appealed to the British Supreme Court for China and Japan in Shanghai, where the chief justice Nicholas John Hannen and justice George Jamieson allowed the counterclaim. The Japanese government proceeded to appeal to the Judicial Committee of the Privy Council, who allowed the appeal and ruled that P&O was not allowed to counterclaim.

The case was remitted to the British Court for Japan for trial. P&O proceeded to settle the case out of court by paying the Japanese government 10,000 pounds sterling in compensation, which corresponded roughly to the cost of purchasing Chishima, but provided no compensation to the families of the cruiser's deceased crew; the Japanese government paid for its own legal costs, while Ravenna's captain was not subject to any punishment for his involvement in the incident. The incident's conclusion was widely viewed as a miscarriage of justice by the Japanese public, and was one issue cited in the drive for revising the unequal treaties between Japan and Western powers to end the practise of extraterritoriality.
