= Canet gun =

Series of weapon systems

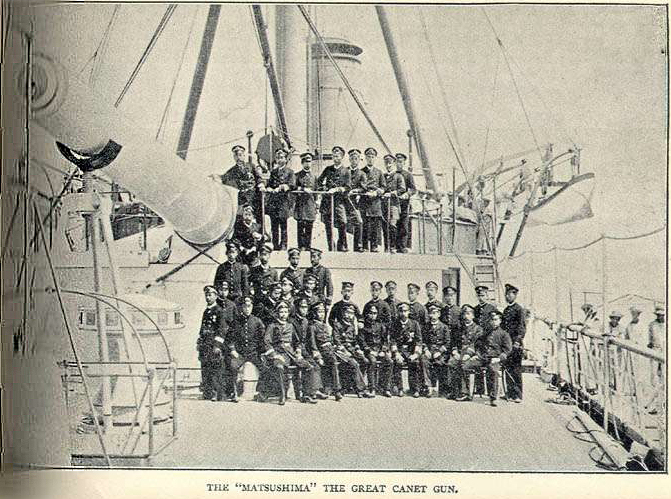
The Canet gun aboard the Japanese cruiser Matsushima

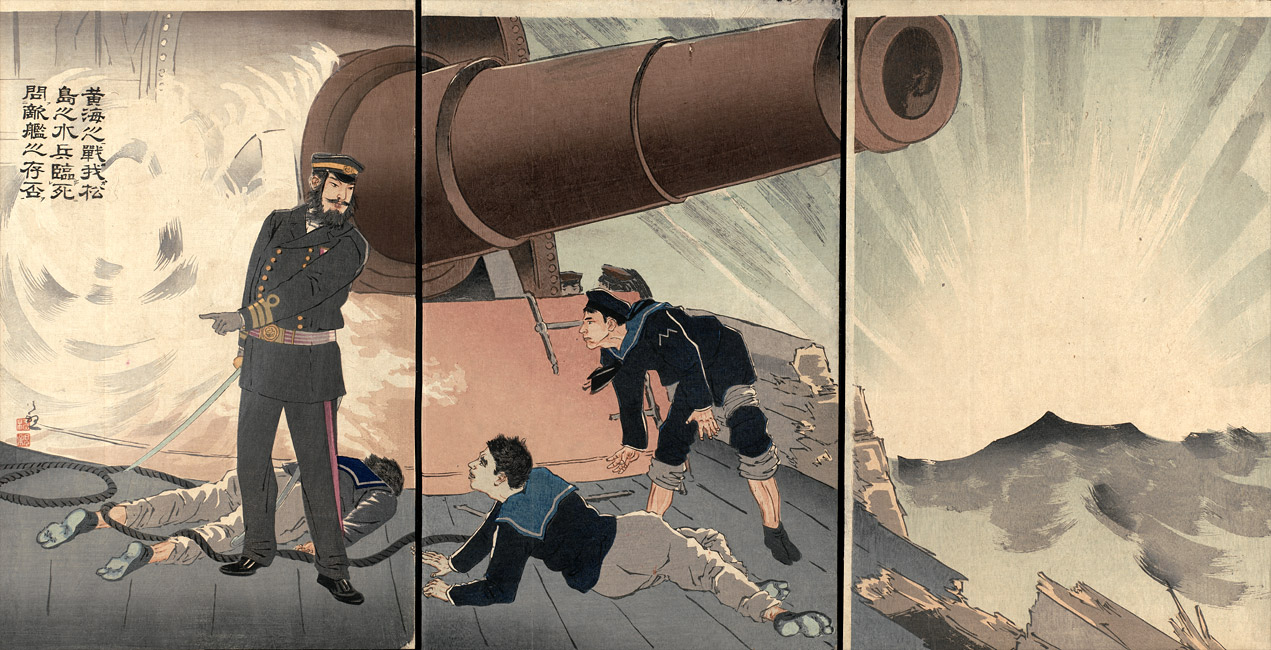
The Canet gun on Matsushima. Kobayashi Kiyochika, 1894

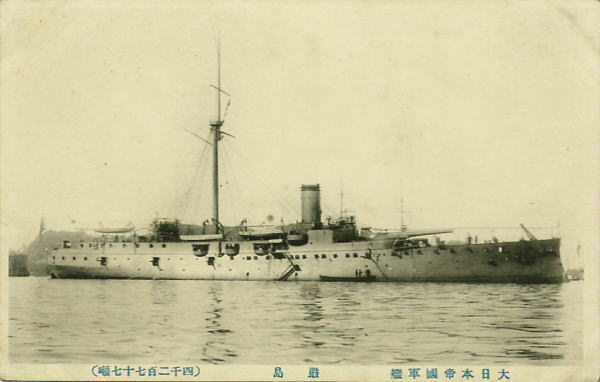
A Canet gun equipping the front of the Japanese cruiser Itsukushima

The Canet guns (French: [kanɛ]) were a series of weapon systems developed by Gustave Canet, who worked as an engineer from 1872 to 1881 for the London Ordnance Works, then for Forges et Chantiers de la Méditerranée, and from 1897 to 1907 for Schneider et Cie of Le Creusot.

== 320 mm naval guns ==
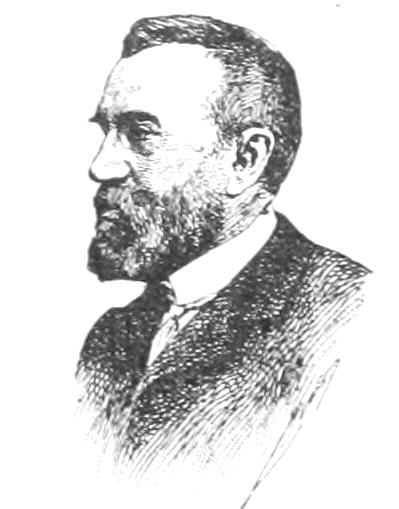
Gustave Canet

Canet developed a 12.6 in (32 cm) 38 cal naval gun, an extremely powerful weapon for its time, specifically for the export market. The gun was first selected by the Spanish Navy in 1884 as part of a large naval expansion program which called for six new battleships. The Spanish armaments firm Hontoria obtained a manufacturing license to produce the weapon, but due to budgetary reasons, only one vessel, the Pelayo, was completed.

Canet was more successful in sales to the Empire of Japan, when the gun was selected by the French military advisor and naval architect Louis-Émile Bertin as the main battery of the Matsushima-class cruiser, new type of cruiser he had designed in 1887. The usage was consistent with the Jeune École philosophy, which advocated placing overwhelming firepower (strong guns, torpedoes) on relatively small ships. This philosophy was of great interest to the Imperial Japanese Navy, which lacked the resources at the time to purchase modern pre-dreadnought battleships.

The guns supplied to Japan equipped the cruisers Matsushima, Itsukushima, and Hashidate. Each gun weighed 67 tons, and had a barrel 12 metres (39 ft) long, firing a 112 cm (44 in) long projectile with weight of 350 kg (770 lb) (or 449 kg (990 lb) high explosive) for an effective range of 8,000 metres (26,000 ft).

The guns proved only marginally successful during the First Sino-Japanese War, due to a slow rate of fire, and numerous mechanical problems. The guns could not be aimed abeam, as their weight would cause the ship to roll over when fired. In combat, gunners were able to fire only around one shot per hour due to the time it took to reload.

== Other guns ==
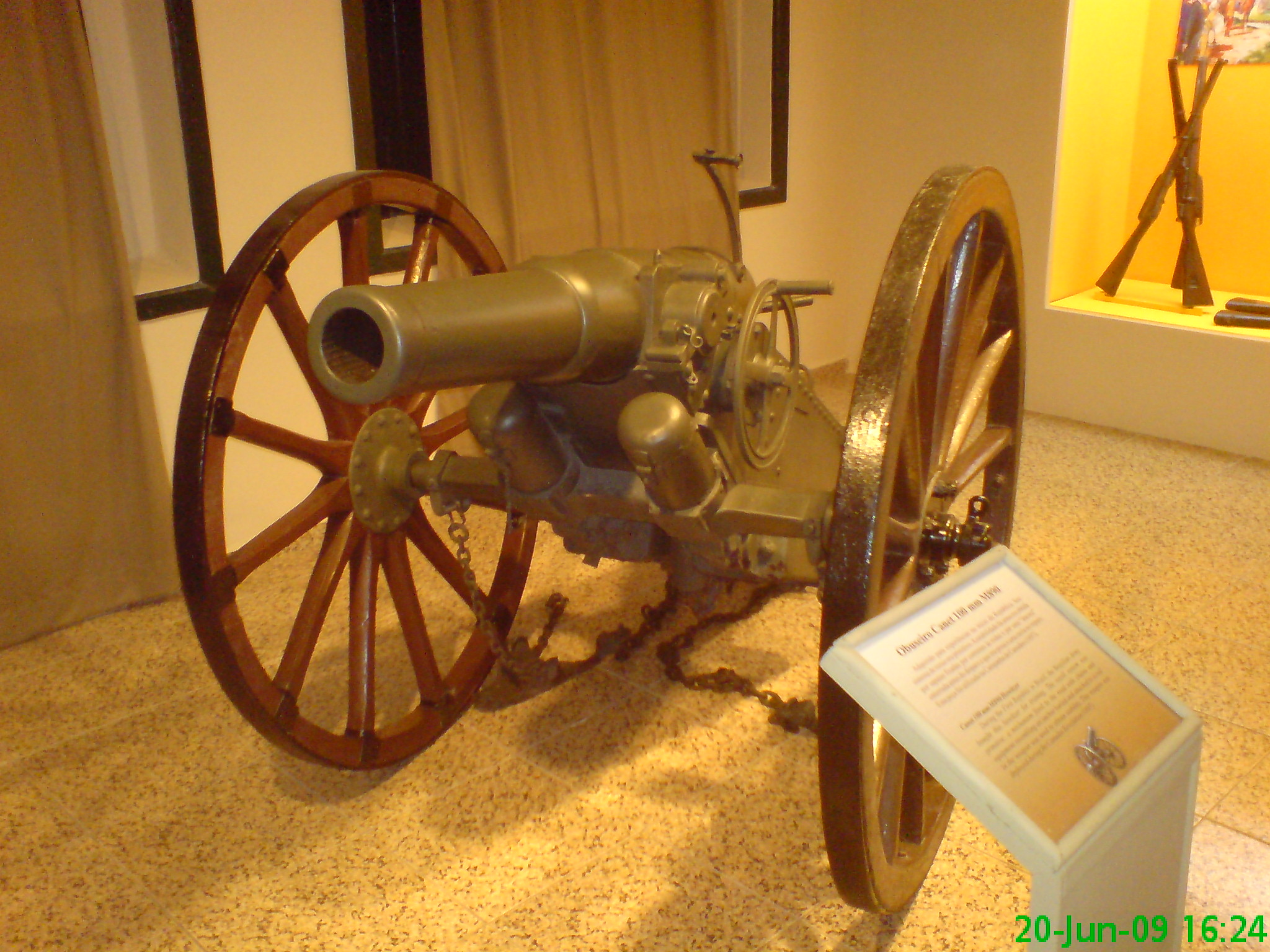
One surviving Canet M1890 (100 mm) gun used by the Brazilian Army to control the Canudos uprising in 1897

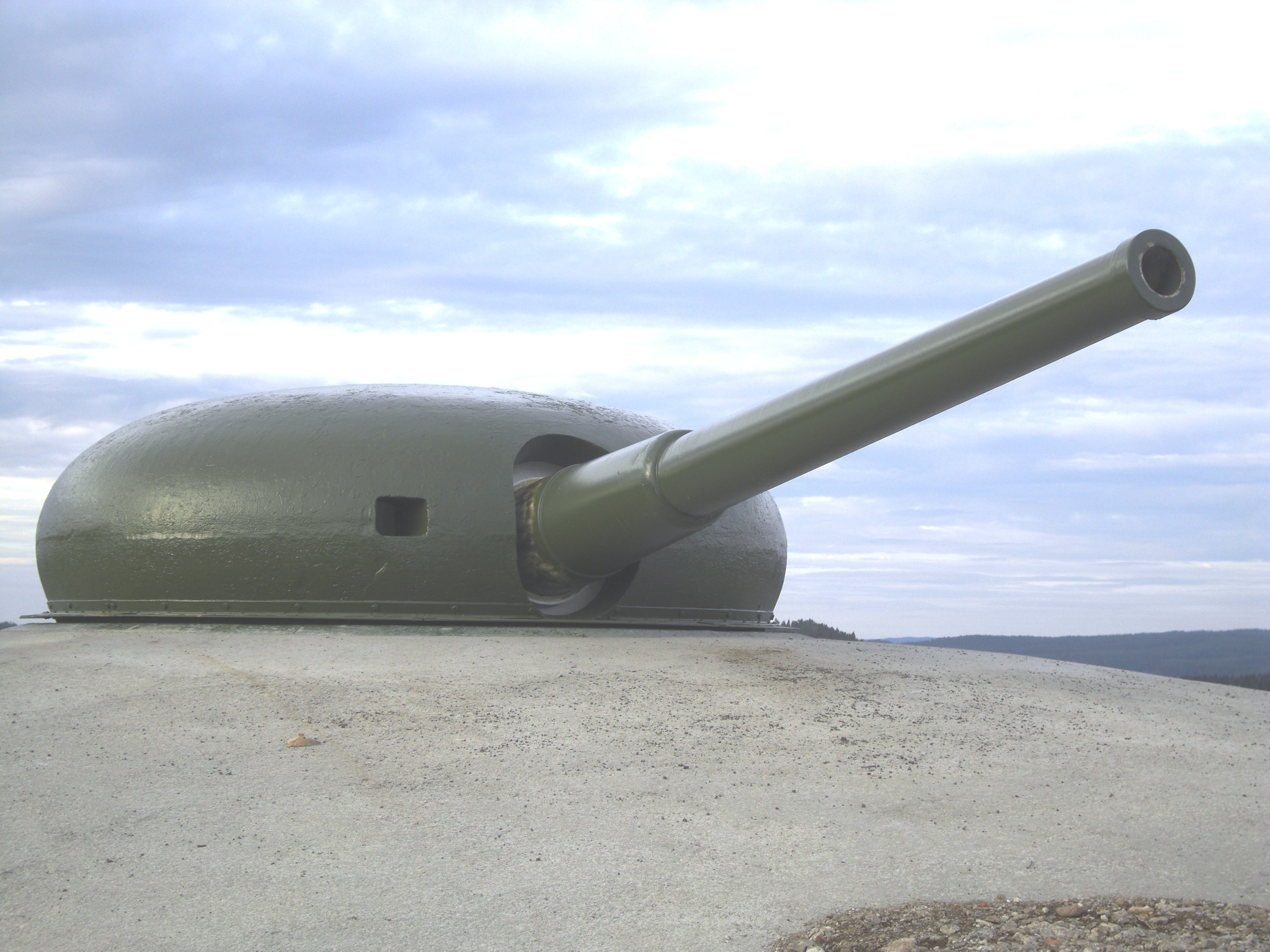
Schneider-Canet L40 M/1902 12 cm turret gun at Høytorp fort, Norway

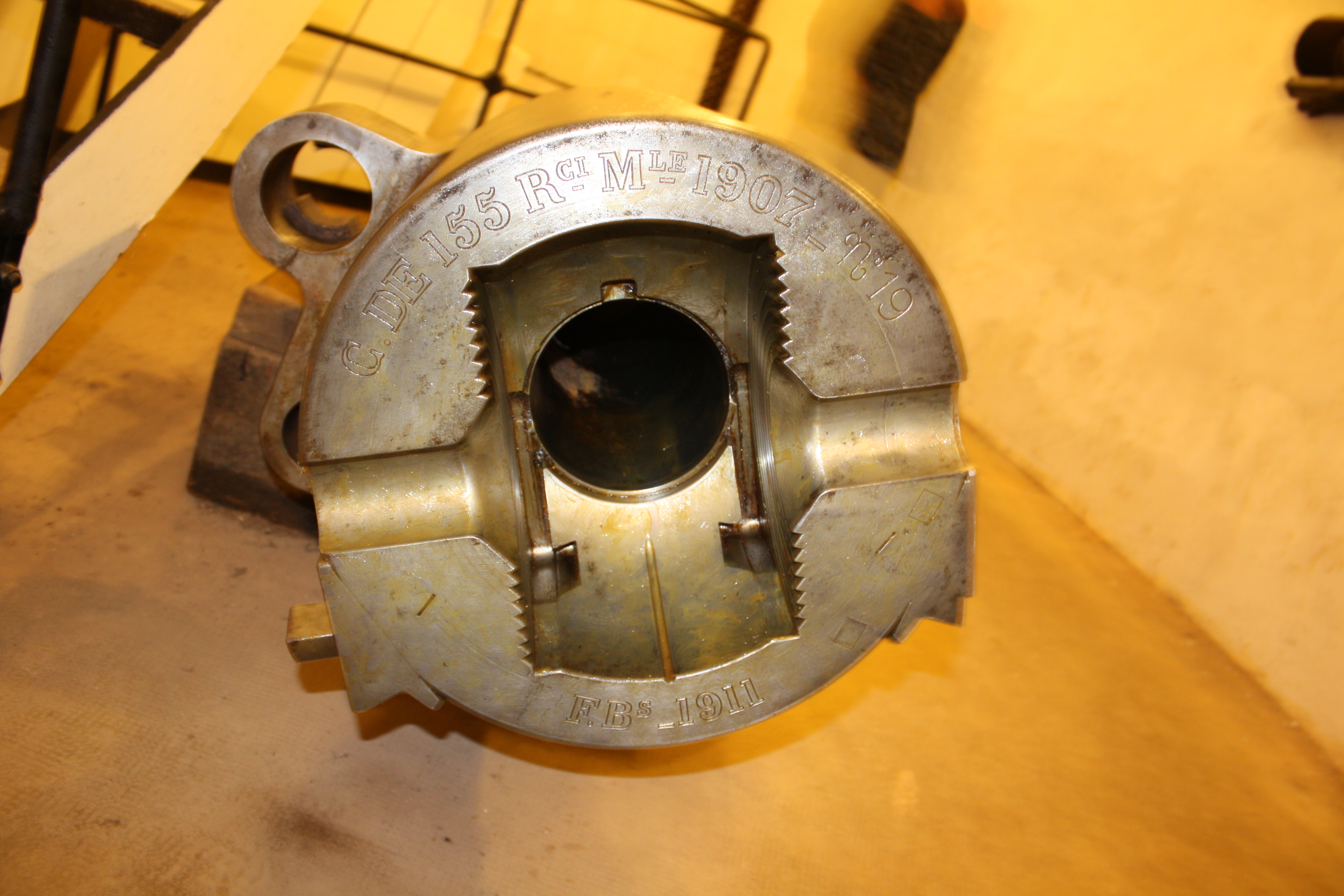
A Canet spherical breech on a 155 mm gun.

Canet is also known for developing the Schneider-Canet gun system for 75 mm iron BL mountain guns, and rapid-fire 120 mm and 152 mm guns.

Canet Designed Guns
Model	Type	Country
75mm 50 caliber Pattern 1892	Naval gun	Russian Empire
Canon de 75 modèle 1905 Schneider	Field gun	France Bulgaria
Canon de 75 mm Modèle 1907 Schneider-Canet	Mountain gun	France Ottoman Empire; Bulgaria Serbia
Canon de 100 mm Modèle 1891	Naval gun	France
120mm 45 caliber Pattern 1892	Naval gun	Russian Empire
Obusier de 120 mm C mle 1897 Schneider-Canet	Howitzer	Serbia
120 mm Schneider-Canet M1897 long gun	Siege gun	France
Peigné-Canet-Schneider mle 1897 gun carriage	Siege gun	France
Obusier de 15 cm TR Schneider-Canet-du-Bocage	Howitzer	Portugal
152 mm 45 caliber Pattern 1892	Naval gun	Russian Empire
203mm 45 caliber Pattern 1892	Naval gun	Russian Empire

== Bibliography ==
- Brooke, Peter (1999). Warships for export: Armstrong warships 1867–1927. Gravesend: World ship society. ISBN 0-905617-89-4.
- Roksund, Arne (2007). The Jeune École: The strategy of the weak. Leiden: Brill. ISBN 9789004157231.
