= Obusier de 120 mm C mle 1897 Schneider-Canet =

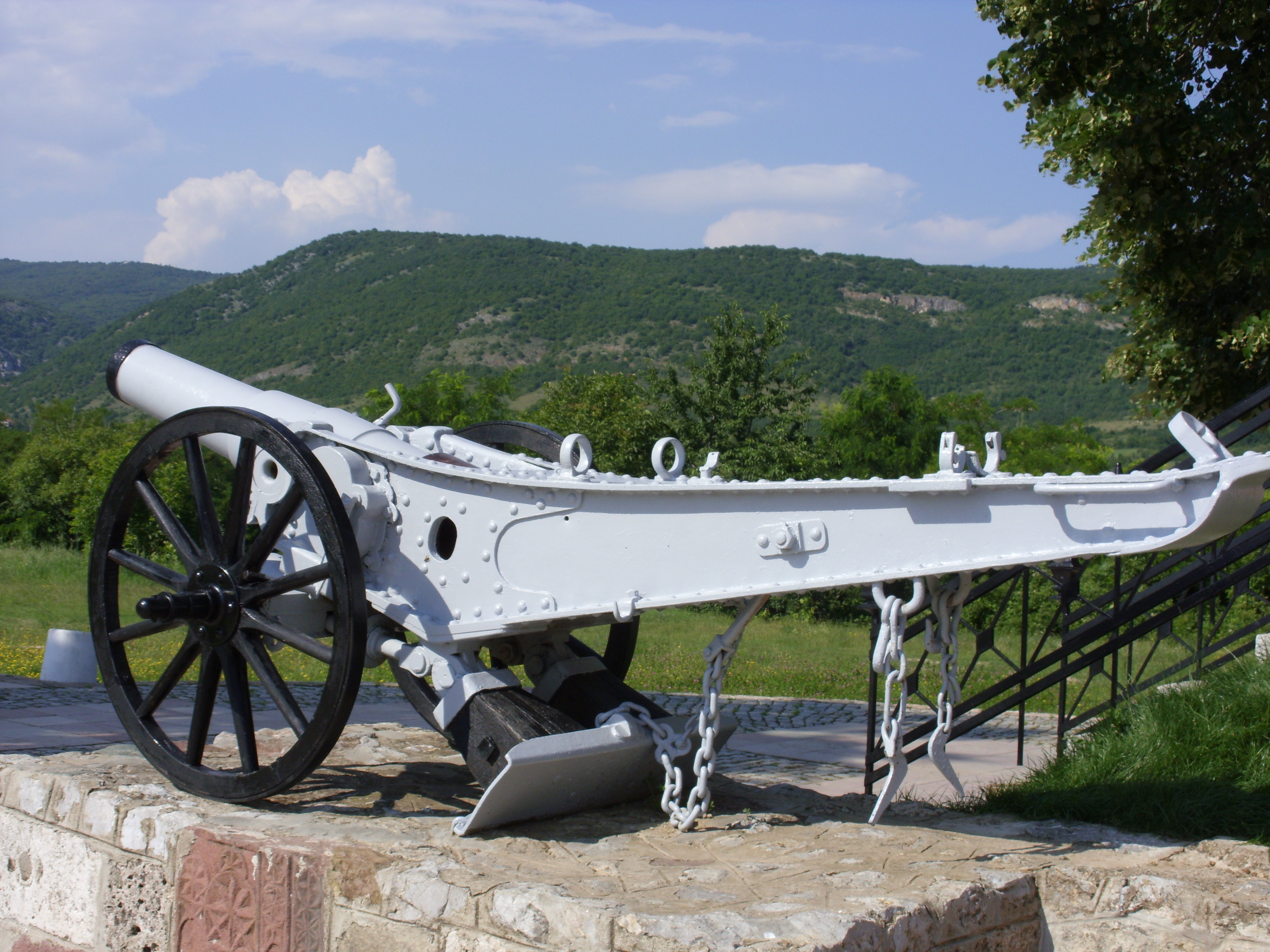
- A Serbian Obusier de 120 mm at the Battle of Čegar Monument in Nis, Serbia.
- Type: Field howitzer
- Place of origin: France

Service history
- Used by: Serbia
- Wars: Balkan Wars; World War I

Production history
- Designer: Schneider-Creusot
- Produced: 1897
- No. built: 22

Specifications
- Mass: Combat: 1,368 kg (3,016 lb); Travel: 2,230 kg (4,920 lb)
- Barrel length: 1.4 m (4 ft 7 in) L/12
- Width: 1.2 m (3 ft 11 in)
- Shell: Separate loading charge and projectile
- Shell weight: 16.4 kg (36 lb) HE, Shrapnel
- Caliber: 120 mm (4.7 in)
- Breech: Interrupted screw
- Recoil: Recoil spade
- Carriage: Box trail
- Elevation: -5° to +45°
- Traverse: 4°
- Muzzle velocity: 315 m/s (1,030 ft/s)
- Maximum firing range: 6 km (3.7 mi)

The Obusier de 120 mm C mle 1897 Schneider-Canet was a howitzer built by the French arms company Schneider-Creusot and used by Serbia during the Balkan Wars and World War I.

== History ==
In 1897 to increase their market share the Establishments Schneider du Creusot acquired the Ateliers d'Artillerie du Havre. As part of that purchase the engineer, Gustave Canet was added to Schneider's design team. Canet had by that time already designed many artillery systems and the guns from his Le Havre workshops were referred to as 'Schneider-Canet' guns for years after.

== Design ==
The Obusier de 120 mm C mle 1897 was a short-barreled horse-drawn howitzer made of steel with an interrupted screw breech which used separate loading black powder propellant charges and projectiles. The box trail carriage incorporated an early form of partial recoil absorption. The recoil system consisted of a hinged recoil spade which was connected to the axle by two large coil springs and rubber blocks. For travel, the carriage was connected to a caisson that carried ammunition and supplies for the gun crew and was towed by a horse team.

== Employment ==
In 1897 the Serbian Army ordered twenty-two howitzers which arrived during the autumn of 1900 and were modernized to use smokeless powder before the Balkan Wars. In 1910 these howitzers were replaced in first-line service by sixty-four Obusier de 120 mm mle 15TR howitzers and the Obusier de 120 mm C mle 1897 was assigned to second-line duty with the Heavy Fortress Artillery Regiments of the Serbian Army. They are believed to have been used during both the Balkan Wars and World War I.

== Gallery ==
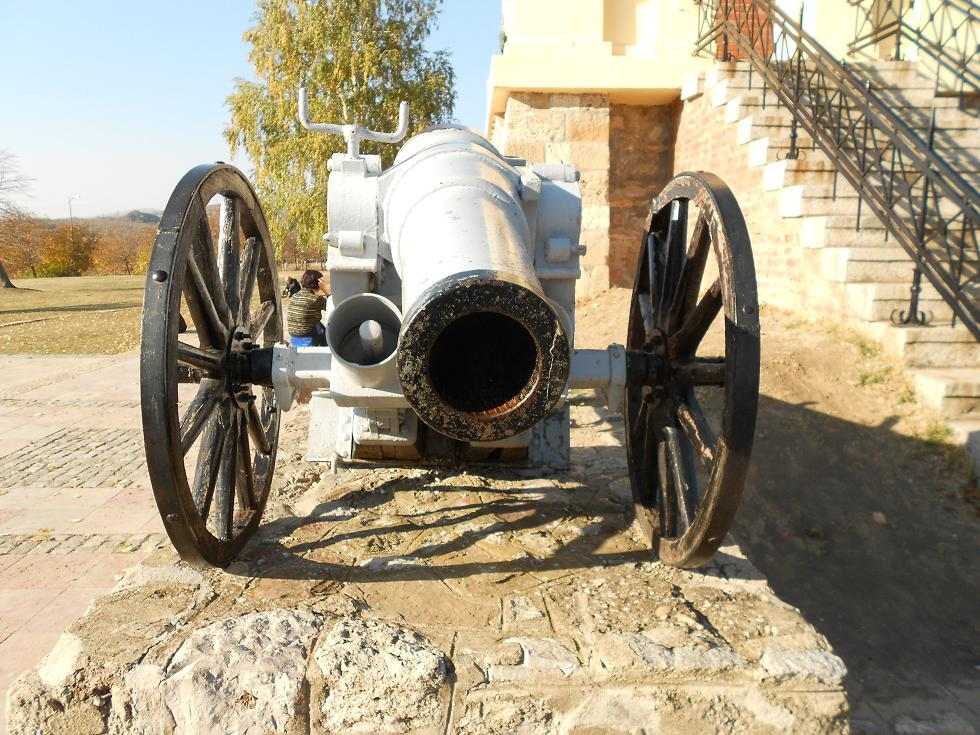
Obusier de 120 mm at the Battle of Čegar Monument.

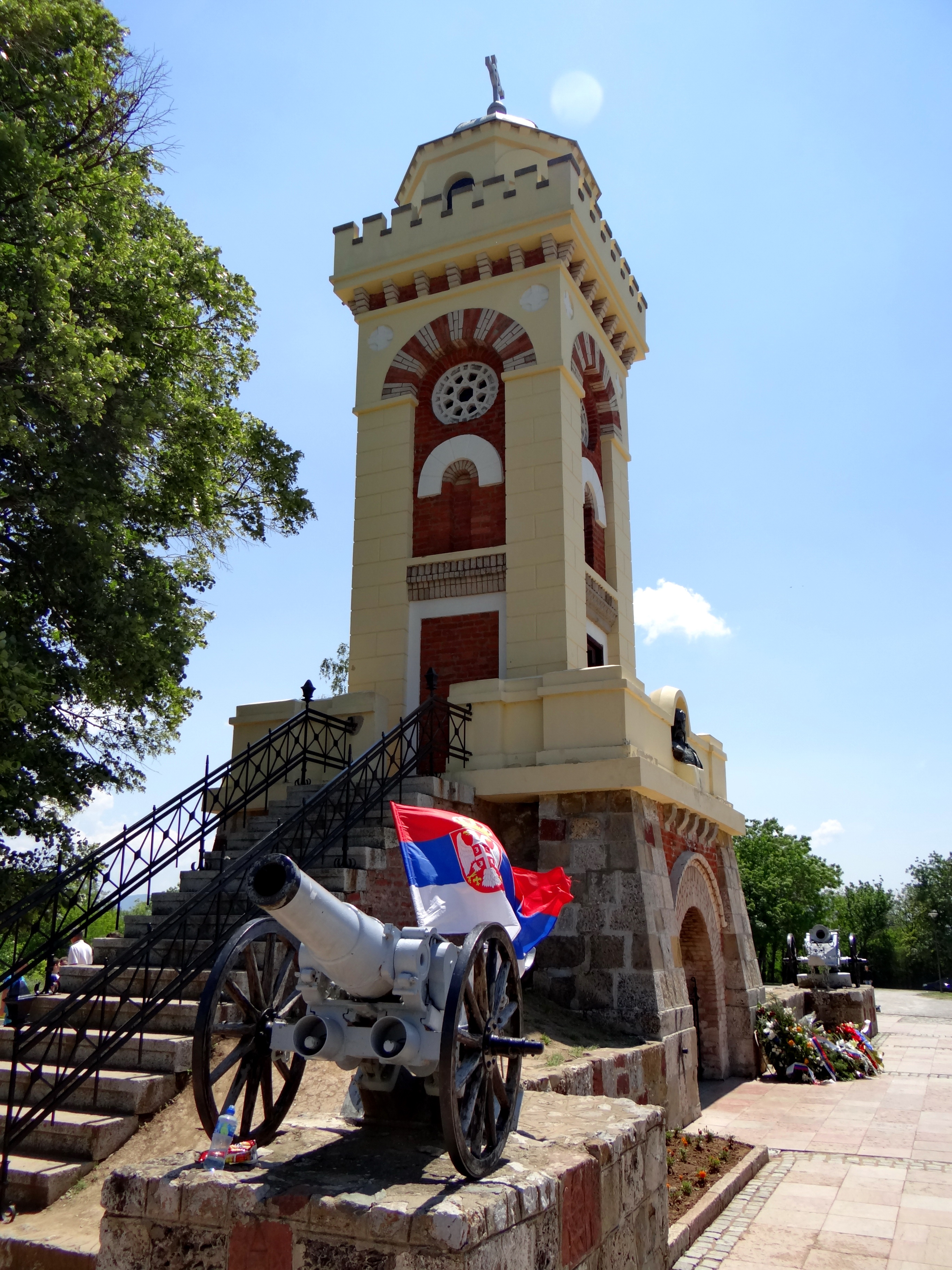
Obusier de 120 mm at the Battle of Čegar Monument.
