= Japanese cruiser Itsukushima =

Naval ship (1889–1926)

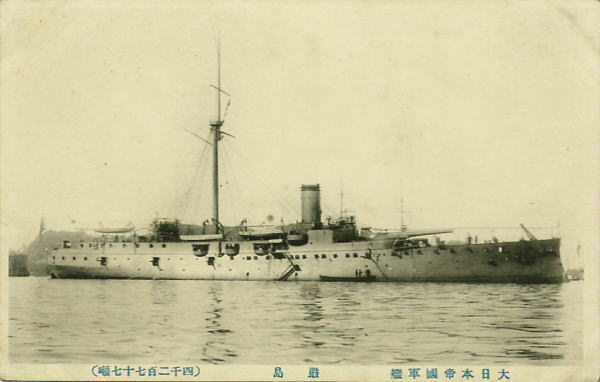
- Itsukushima in 1904

History

Empire of Japan
- Name: Itsukushima
- Namesake: Itsukushima Shrine
- Ordered: 1886 Fiscal Year
- Builder: Société Nouvelle des Forges et Chantiers de la Méditerranée, La Seyne-sur-Mer, France
- Laid down: 7 January 1888
- Launched: 18 July 1889
- Completed: 3 September 1891
- Stricken: 12 March 1926
- Fate: Scrapped 1926

General characteristics
- Class & type: Matsushima-class cruiser
- Displacement: 4,278 long tons (4,347 t)
- Length: 91.81 m (301 ft 3 in) w/l
- Beam: 15.6 m (51 ft 2 in)
- Draft: 6.05 m (19 ft 10 in)
- Propulsion: 2-shaft reciprocating; 6 boilers; 5,400 hp (4,000 kW), 680 tons coal
- Speed: 16.5 knots (19.0 mph; 30.6 km/h)
- Complement: 360
- Armament: 1 × 320 mm (12.6 in) Canet gun; 12 × QF 4.7 inch Gun Mk I–IV guns; 5 × QF 3 pounder Hotchkiss guns; 11 × QF 1 pounder Hotchkiss 5 barrel rotary guns; 4 × 356 mm (14.0 in) torpedo tubes
- Armor: Deck: 50 mm (2 in); Gun Turret: 300 mm (12 in); Gun shield: 100 mm (4 in)

Itsukushima (厳島) was the lead ship in the Matsushima class of protected cruisers of the Imperial Japanese Navy. Like her sister ships, (Matsushima and Hashidate) the name Itsukushima comes from one of the traditional Three Views of Japan, in this case, the Itsukushima Shrine in Hiroshima prefecture on the Seto Inland Sea, home to a famous Shinto-Buddhist shrine dedicated to the Buddhist goddess Benzaiten.

== Background ==
Forming the backbone of the Imperial Japanese Navy during the First Sino-Japanese War, the Matsushima-class cruisers were based on the principles of Jeune Ecole, as promoted by French military advisor and naval architect Louis-Émile Bertin. The Japanese government did not have the resources or budget to build a battleship navy to counter the various foreign powers active in Asia; instead, Japan adopted the radical theory of using smaller, faster warships, with light armor and small caliber long-range guns, coupled with a massive single 320 mm (12.6 in) Canet gun. The design eventually proved impractical, as the recoil from the huge cannon was too much for a vessel of such small displacement, and its reloading time was impractically long; however, the Matsushima-class cruisers served their purpose well against the poorly equipped and poorly led Imperial Chinese Beiyang Fleet.

Itsukushima was built by the Société Nouvelle des Forges et Chantiers de la Méditerranée naval shipyards at La Seyne-sur-Mer, in France, and was launched on 18 July 1889. She underwent trials by the builder in September and October, and achieved an average maximum speed of 16.78 knots on 15 October 1890.

== Design ==
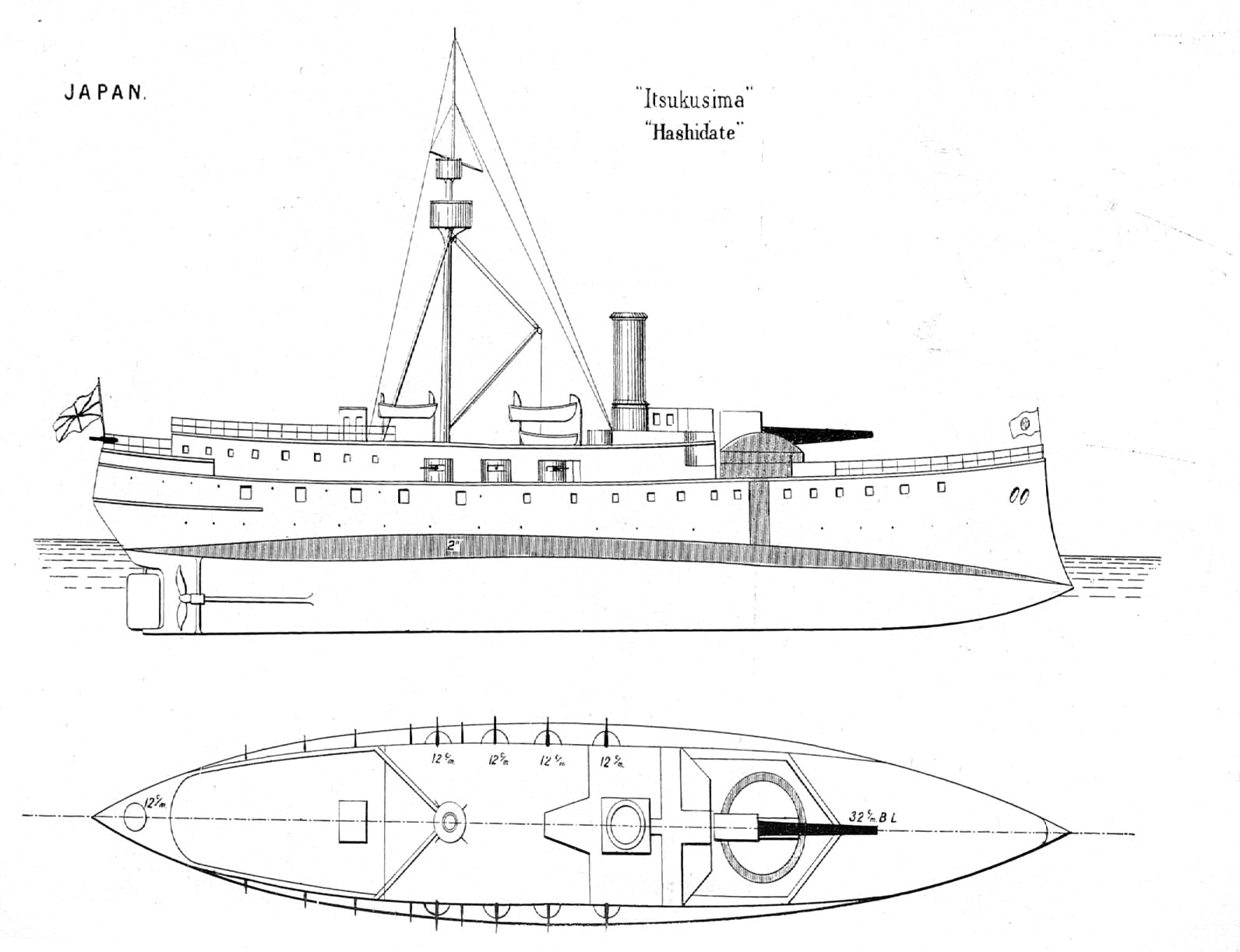
Armour and armament sketch of Itsukushima and Hashidate

Itsukushima differed from her sister ship Hashidate primarily in that her windows were square instead of rectangular, and in that Hashidate had a stronger engine.

Itsukushima had a steel hull with 94 frames constructed of mild steel, and a double bottom, divided into waterproof compartments, with the area between the bulkheads and armor filled with copra. The bow was reinforced with a naval ram. The vital equipment, including boilers and ammunition magazines, were protected by hardened steel armor, as were the gun shields. The main armament consisted of one breech-loading 320 mm (13 in) Canet gun mounted in the bow of the ship, which could fire 450 kg (992 lb) armor-piercing or 350 kg (772 lb) explosive shells at an effective range of 8,000 meters (8,700 yd). The maximum rate of fire was two rounds per hour, and the ship carried 60 rounds. Secondary armament consisted of twelve QF 4.7 inch Gun Mk I–IV Armstrong guns, with a maximum range of 9,000 meters (9,800 yd) and maximum rate of fire of 12 rounds/minute. Ten were mounted on the gun deck, five to each side, with the eleventh gun located on the upper deck of the fantail, with a twelfth mounted on the lower deck of the fantail. Each gun was equipped with 120 rounds. Tertiary protection was by six QF 6 pounder Hotchkiss mounted in sponsons on the upper deck, with a maximum range of 6,000 meters (6,600 yd) and rate of fire of 20 rounds/minute. Each gun had 300 rounds. In addition, eleven QF 3 pounder Hotchkiss were mounted at various locations, with range of 2,200 meters (2,400 yd) rate of fire of 32 rounds/minute and 800 rounds per gun. Each ship in the class also had four 356 mm (14 in) torpedo tubes, three in the bow and one in the stern, with a total of 20 torpedoes carried on board. The weight of all of this weaponry led to the design becoming dangerously top-heavy, and armor was sacrificed in an effort to reduce weight.

The ship was driven by two horizontal triple expansion steam engines. However, the design had problems with seaworthiness, and the design speed was seldom attained in operation.

== Service record ==
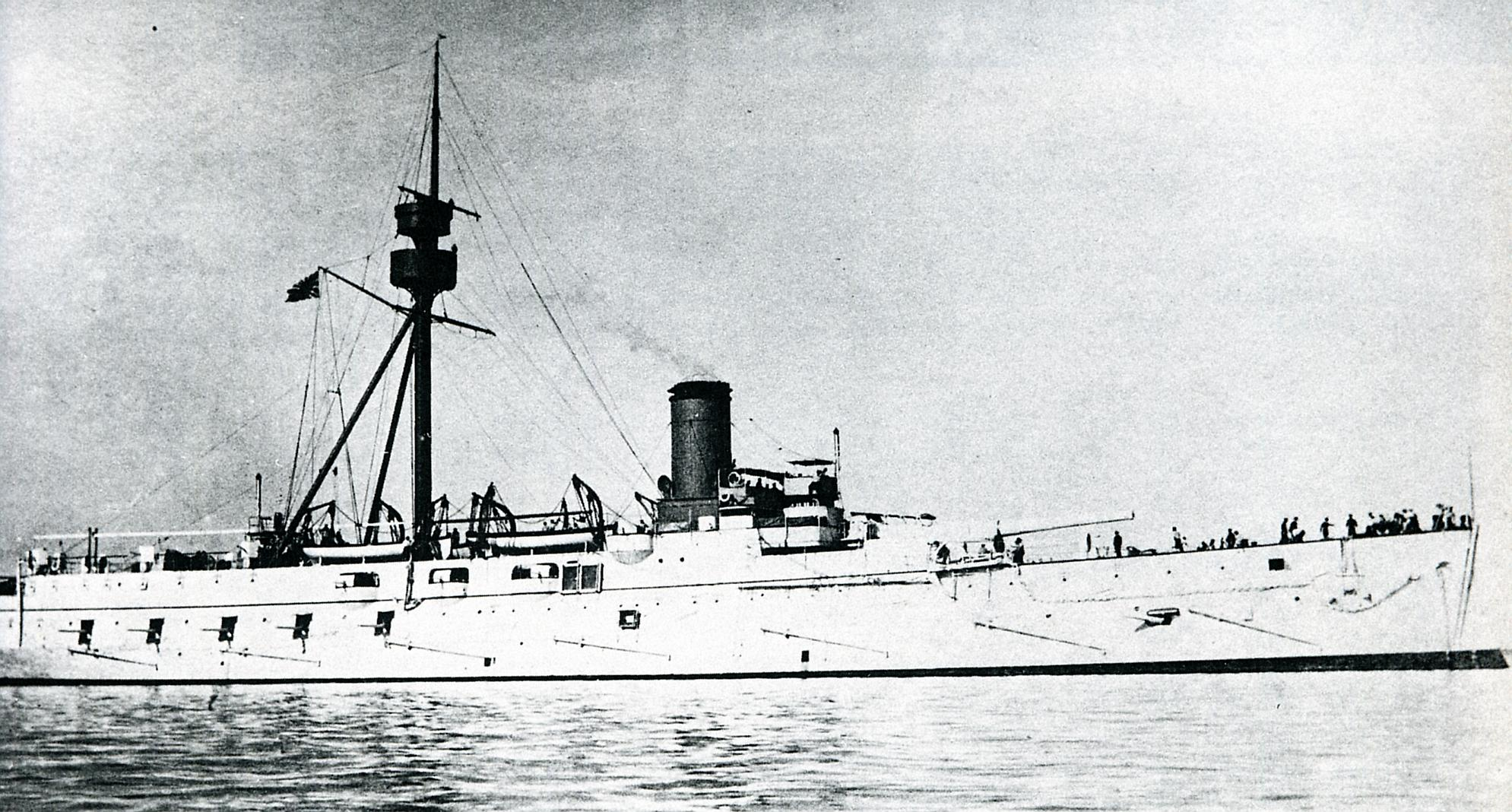
In 1893

Itsukushima was accepted by the Imperial Japanese Navy on 3 September 1891, and departed Toulon for Japan on 12 November. However, during the voyage, her tube boilers began to leak profusely, and she had to be repaired in Colombo Ceylon by a repair team sent from France. She was only able to depart Colombo on 18 April 1892, arriving at Kure Naval District on 21 May 1892.

=== First Sino-Japanese War ===
As one of the most modern vessels in the Imperial Japanese Navy, Itsukushima became part of the main Japanese fleet under Vice Admiral Itō Sukeyuki, and participated in the 17 September 1894 Battle of the Yalu River. Assigned third place in the Japanese line of battle, behind Matsushima and Chiyoda, the shortcomings of her design soon became evident. During the battle, she was able to fire her Canet gun only five times, hitting the Chinese flagship Dingyuan four times and Zhenyuan once, without creating appreciable damage to either vessel. In return, she took eight hits, including one to her engine room, bow torpedo room and one which severed her main mast. In the encounter, she suffered 15 killed and 17 wounded.

Afterwards, Itsukushima was assigned to protect convoys transporting troops and equipment to Manchuria and saw combat again at the Battle of Weihaiwei of 9 February 1895. During this battle, she was hit by a dud shell from one of the Chinese coastal batteries, which did not cause any significant damage.

=== Interwar years ===
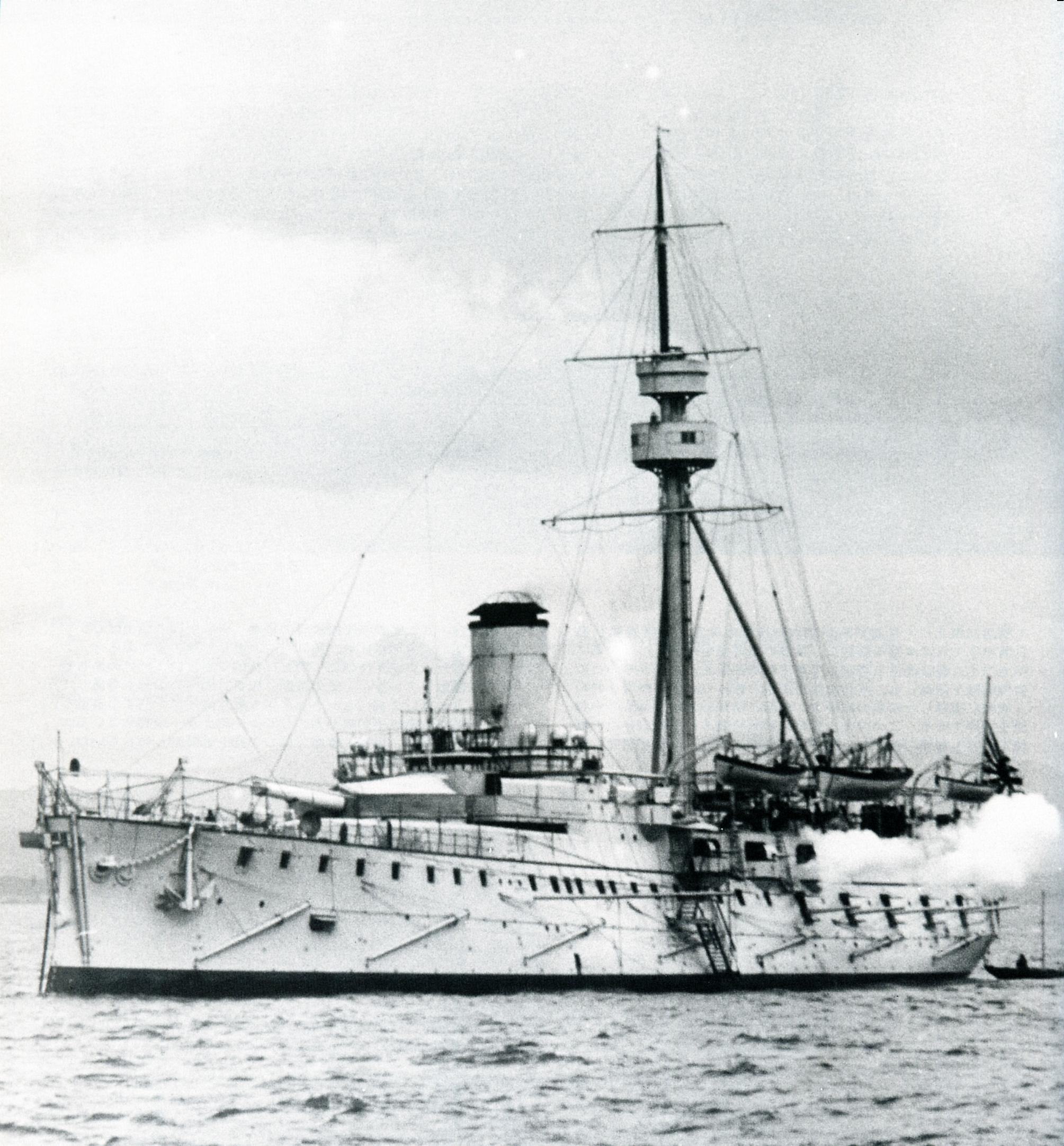
At Kobe in 1897, firing salute

Itsukushima was among warships anchored in the Seto Inland Sea off Nagahama, Shikoku, Japan, when a strong gale struck on 29 October 1897. The central battery ironclad Fusō's anchor chain broke, and Fusō drifted across the harbor, collided with the ram of Itsukushima's sister ship Matsushima and then struck Itsukushima before sinking in shallow water on a reef. Fusō later was refloated, repaired, and returned to service.

Itsukushima was reclassified as a second-class cruiser on 21 March 1898. She suffered persistent problems with her boilers, which were de-rated in pressure by February 1900, limiting her speed to less than 12.5 knots (23.2 km/h; 14.4 mph). Her 37 mm guns were also replaced by six Maxim guns in 1900.

During the Boxer Rebellion, Itsukushima was assigned to Shanghai to help protect Japanese civilians and interests.

On 25 February 1901, Itsukushima and Hashidate departed Yokosuka on a training tour which took them to Manila, Batavia, Hong Kong, Chelumpo, Pusan, Gensan, and Vladivostok, returning to Yokosuka on 14 August 1901. On her return, she was overhauled, with her boilers replaced by more reliable Belleville boilers, and her smaller armament replaced by two 76 mm guns and 18 QF 3 pounder Hotchkiss 47 mm guns.

In March 1903 it was announced that Itsukushima, together with Hashidate (flagship) and Matsushima had departed Yokosuka 15 February 1903 on a further training tour which would take them to Hong Kong, Singapore, Batavia, Perth, Adelaide, Melbourne, Sydney, Wellington, Auckland, Sydney, Townsville, Thursday Island, Manila, Amoy, and Fusan. This tour was of great significance in Australia, being the first visit of the Japanese fleet since the 1887 visit for the jubilee of Queen Victoria in 1887, further the ships were now fitted with Marconi wireless telegraphy equipment and its use there was amongst the earliest in Australia. The ship's crew included Captain K. Matsumoto, vice-captain Tetsutaro Sato, paymaster Koshi Tomchiro and assistant paymaster Tsuruyo Furusawa. Captain Matsumoto was comprehensively interviewed by a Perth journalist while awaiting the arrival of the flagship.

Further training cruises were undertaken in 1906, 1907, and 1914.

=== Russo-Japanese War ===
During the Russo-Japanese War, the obsolete Itsukushima and her sister ships were assigned to the 5th squadron of the reserve IJN 3rd Fleet, together with the equally outdated ironclad battleship Chin'en under the command of Admiral Kataoka Shichirō. Despite the limited capability of his ships, Admiral Kataoka was assigned to support the blockade of Port Arthur by patrols and escorts in the Korea Strait starting in February 1904 based out of the Takeshiki Guard District on Tsushima island. During May, Itsukushima covered the landings of the Japanese First Army and Japanese Second Army in Manchuria. From June through July, Itsukushima supported the Battle of Port Arthur by patrols of the harbor mouth, and shore bombardment of Russian positions, skirmishing with the Russian cruiser Novik on 26 June and with the cruiser Bayan on 9 July, and with Bayan, Askold and Pallada on 26 July.

On 10 August 1904, Itsukushima was under repairs and could not take part in the Battle of the Yellow Sea, but was in position to monitor the return of the Russian fleet to Port Arthur. Itsukushima remained stationed at the entrance to Port Arthur until the Russian surrender in January 1905. After the fall of Port Arthur, on 8 February, Itsukushima returned to Kure Naval Arsenal for repairs, which took until 22 March. On 5 April, she was back on station in the Korea Strait.

At the time of the Battle of Tsushima on 27 May 1905, Itsukushima was the flagship for Vice Admiral Kataoka's 3rd Squadron. Itsukushima opened fire on the Russian cruisers Oleg and Aurora at around 1630 at a distance of 8,000 meters (8,700 yd). Fighting continued past sundown, with the Japanese squadron sinking the repair ship Kamchatka and the battleship Knyaz Suvorov. During the first day of the battle, Itsukushima took no damage. After participating in accepting the surrender by Russian Admiral Nebogatov of the remaining ships in the Russian formation on 28 May, Itsukushima began a search for any stragglers who might attempt an escape towards Vladivostok. She returned to patrols in the Korea Strait on 30 May.

On 14 June, Itsukushima was assigned to the force assembled for the invasion of Sakhalin, which took place in July. Afterwards, she was assigned to patrols of Tsugaru Strait and returned to Yokosuka Naval Arsenal for repairs on 26 August. She participated in the naval review celebrating the Japanese victory in Yokohama on 23 October.

On 28 August 1912, Itsukushima was re-classified as a second-class coastal defense vessel, and later used as a submarine tender. She was demilitarized on 1 September 1920 and re-classified as a training hulk. She was struck from the navy list and scrapped on 12 March 1926 at Kure Naval Arsenal.
