= Kataoka Shichirō =

Japanese admiral (1854–1920)

Baron Kataoka Shichirō
- 片岡 七郎
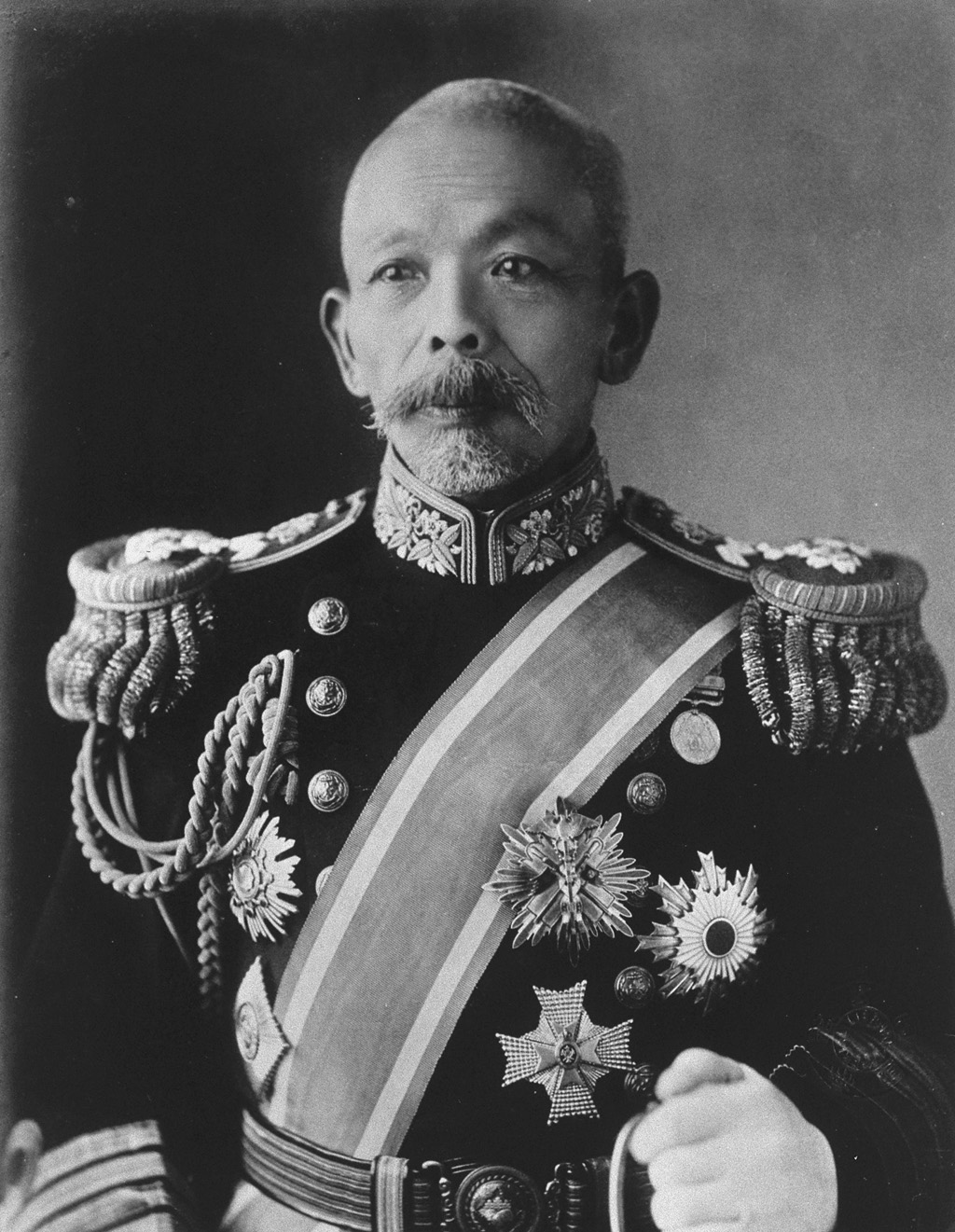
- Born: 12 January 1854; Kagoshima, Satsuma, Japan
- Died: 11 January 1920 (aged 65); Tokyo, Japan
- Military career
- Allegiance: Empire of Japan
- Branch: Imperial Japanese Navy
- Service years: 1871–1918
- Rank: Admiral
- Commands: Kongō; Naniwa; IJN Third Fleet; IJN First Fleet
- Conflicts: First Sino-Japanese War; Conquest of Taiwan; Russo-Japanese War; Battle of the Yellow Sea; Battle of Tsushima; Invasion of Sakhalin
- Awards: Order of the Rising Sun; Order of the Sacred Treasure; Order of the Golden Kite

Baron Kataoka Shichirō (片岡 七郎; 12 January 1854 – 11 January 1920) was an early admiral of the Imperial Japanese Navy.

== Biography ==
=== Early career ===
Born to a samurai family in the Satsuma domain (present day Kagoshima prefecture), Kataoka entered the 3rd class of the Imperial Japanese Naval Academy in 1871, and served as a midshipman on the corvette Tsukuba.

Kataoka, accompanied Prince Fushimi Hiroyasu as an exchange student to Germany. He became fluent in German, French and English during his 18 months abroad and graduated with the top honors in his class. He later trained with future Admiral Yamamoto Gonnohyōe on board the German ships Vineta and Leipzig from 1877-1878.

Serving as a lieutenant in various fleet posts from 1881–1886, his first command was that of the corvette Tenryū on 20 June 1882. Kataoka also served as an instructor for two years at the Imperial Japanese Naval Academy before returning to Germany in 1889 for advanced studies. Following the completion of his studies, Kataoka was assigned to Berlin as a naval attaché, with his primary duty being to provide assistance to Prince Higashifushimi Yorihito and Prince Yamashina Kikumaro during their travels in Europe. He was recalled to Japan at the start of the First Sino-Japanese War in 1894.

=== First Sino-Japanese War ===
Appointed to the Imperial Japanese Navy General Staff during the early months of the war, Kataoka was soon placed in command of the corvette Kongō and later of the cruiser Naniwa during the Pescadores expedition and conquest of Taiwan between late 1894 and early 1895.

Following the war, Kataoka served at a number of various fleet and shore posts and was promoted to rear admiral in 1899, and later vice admiral in 1903. He turned down a posting as Resident-General of Korea and also turned down a posting as Governor-General of Taiwan, stating that as a navy man, he did not have the ability to handle territorial issues. In reality, he had no interest in politics at all.

=== Russo-Japanese War ===
During the opening months of the Russo-Japanese War, Kataoka was placed in command of the 3rd Fleet, a collection of antiquated ships nicknamed the "Funny Fleet". Despite the motley assortment of obsolete ships, Kataoka won distinction commanding the fifth and sixth battle divisions from the cruiser Nisshin during the Battle of the Yellow Sea and later from the cruiser Itsukushima during the Battle of Tsushima. He also led the naval expedition to seize Sakhalin prior to the conclusion of the Treaty of Portsmouth.

A year after the war, Kataoka became chief of the Navy Ministry's Department of Ships.

In 1907, Kataoka was elevated to the title of danshaku (baron) under the kazoku peerage system, and was promoted to full admiral and made commander-in-chief of the 1st Fleet in 1910, before being placed on the reserve list the following year.

Kataoka lived in retirement until his death in 1920. His grave is at the Tama Cemetery in Tokyo.

== Notes ==
Military offices
Fleet created	3rd Fleet; Commander-in-chief; 28 December 1903 - 20 December 1905	Fleet dissolved, post next held by Teragaki Izō
Preceded by Tōgō Heihachirō	1st Fleet; Commander-in-chief; 20 December 1905 – 22 November 1906	Succeeded by Arima Shinichi
Preceded by Hidaka Sōnojō	Maizuru Naval District; Commander-in-chief; 28 August 1908 - 18 January 1911	Succeeded by Misu Sōtarō
