= Takeshiki Guard District =

Coordinates: 34°16′4.8″N 129°18′43.5″E

The Takeshiki Guard District (竹敷要港部, Takeshiki Yōkōbu) was a navy base for the Imperial Japanese Navy located in the former Mitsushima town (美津島町) (now part of present-day Tsushima, Nagasaki), on Tsushima Island, during the Russo-Japanese War. The Takeshiki Guard District was responsible for the control of the strategic Korea Strait, which divided Japan from the Asian mainland. The district was disbanded in 1912.

== History ==
The Guard Districts (警備府, Keibifu) were second tier naval bases, similar to the first tier Naval Districts (鎮守府), with docking, fueling and resupply facilities, but typically lacking a shipyard or training school. They tended to be established by strategic waterways or major port cities for defensive purposes. In concept, the Guard District was similar to the United States Navy Sea Frontiers concept. The Guard District maintained a small garrison force of ships and Naval Land Forces which reported directly to the Guard District commander, and hosted detachments from the various fleets of the Imperial Navy on a temporary assignment basis.

The port of Takeshiki on Tsushima island was selected on 1 April 1896 to be a forward staging area and coaling station under the command of the Sasebo Naval District. From January 1904, with the start of the Russo-Japanese War, as the naval support facility closest to the combat off Port Arthur, the base facilities were greatly expanded with the addition of a military hospital and ship repair facilities. However, following the end of the war and the annexation of Korea, the base lost its strategic importance. It was closed on 30 September 1912, with most of its functions superseded by the Ryojun Guard District in the Kwantung Leased Territory.
