= Chinese hospital ship Daishan Dao =

Chinese hospital ship

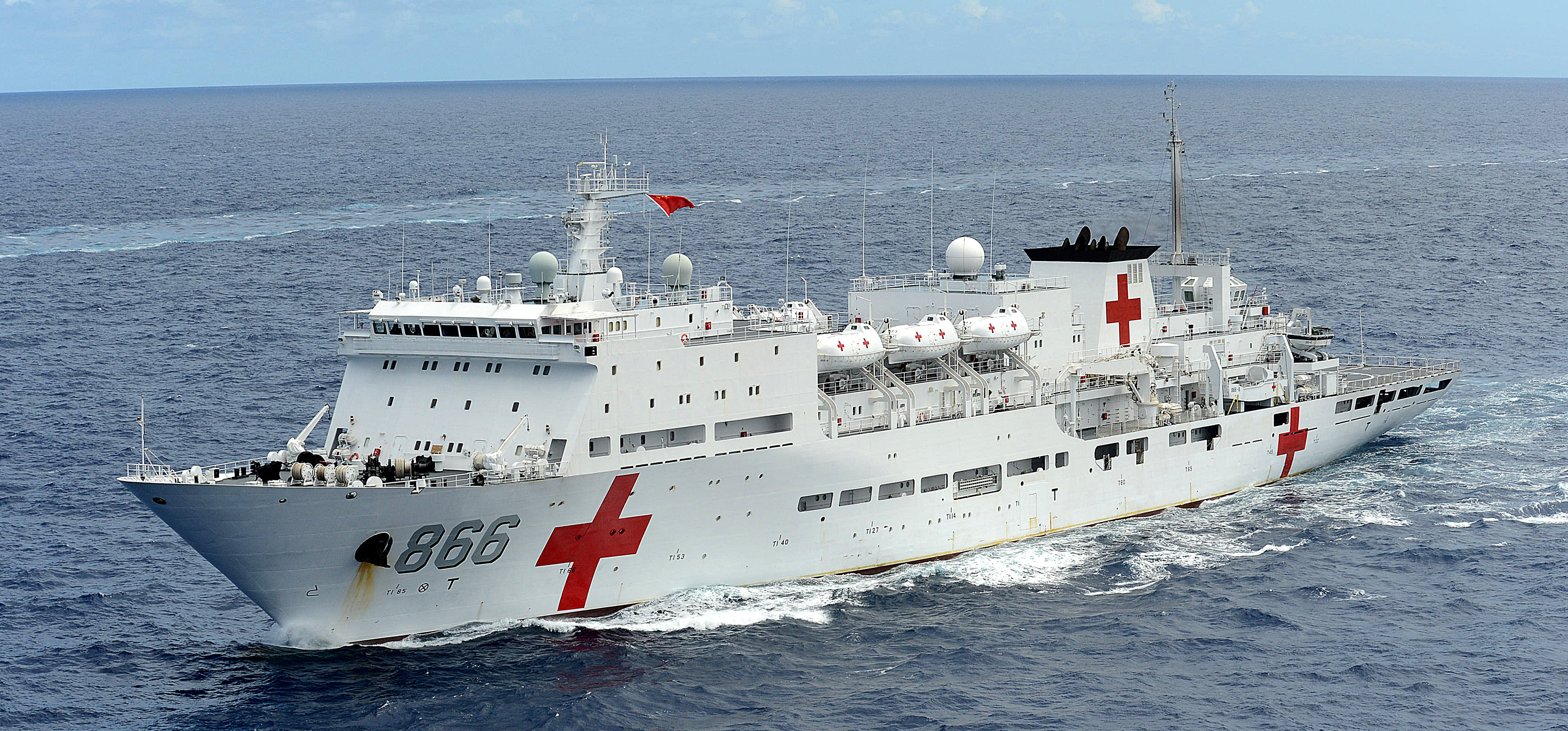
- Hospital ship Daishan Dao (Peace Ark)

History

China
- Name: Daishan Dao (navy); (Chinese: 岱山岛); Peace Ark (peacetime); (Chinese: 和平方舟)
- Namesake: Daishan Island
- Builder: CSIC (Guangzhou Shipyard International Company Limited)
- Launched: 2007
- Commissioned: December 22, 2008
- Home port: Zhoushan
- Status: in active service

General characteristics
- Class & type: Type 920 hospital ship
- Displacement: approximately 14,000 tons
- Length: 178 m (584 ft 0 in)
- Beam: approximately 25 m (82 ft 0 in)
- Propulsion: twin engines
- Aircraft carried: Z-8JH helicopter (27 passengers or 15 stretchers)
- Aviation facilities: Hangar

Daishan Dao is a Type 920 hospital ship of the People's Liberation Army Navy of the People's Republic of China. Daishan Dao is also known as Peace Ark during peacetime, and has received NATO reporting name Anwei class (meaning comfort). It is stationed at Zhoushan Naval Base, Zhoushan and is part of the East Sea Fleet.

Daishan Dao is the first Type 920 hospital ship and was once the only ship of this class until around 2023, when a new ship of the same class, Silk Road Ark, was built and carried out its first medical mission in 2024.

== History ==
The ship was launched in 2007 with the stated intention of giving China a platform to provide a better means to providing quicker humanitarian response to disasters around the world, but others contend it also allows China to extend the navy's blue water capabilities. Peace Ark is primarily engaged in China's international humanitarian medical relief efforts, known as "Mission Harmony."

On 1 September 2010, the hospital ship embarked on a three-month Mission Harmony-2010 to the Gulf of Aden with a total of 428 officers including 100 medical workers. Peace Ark visited Djibouti, Kenya, Tanzania, the Seychelles and Bangladesh. It provided medical services to 17,345 outpatients and performed 97 surgeries.

After sailing across the Pacific Ocean and passing through the Panama Canal for Mission Harmony-2011, the ship arrived in the Caribbean Sea, where it visited Cuba, Jamaica, Trinidad and Tobago, and Costa Rica. It provided outpatient services for 11,446 people and 118 surgeries were performed.

The ship returned to Southeast and Southern Asia for Mission Harmony-2013, visiting Brunei, the Maldives, Pakistan, India, Bangladesh, Myanmar, Indonesia and Cambodia. It provided services to 30,713 people and 293 surgeries were performed. In November 2013, she was deployed to Tacloban, Philippines to assist in the recovery from Typhoon Haiyan.

Peace Ark also participated as part of the Chinese contribution to Exercise RIMPAC 2014 in addition to the United States hospital ship USNS Mercy. After the Rim of the Pacific 2014 exercise which ended on August 3, Peace Ark immediately switched to the Mission Harmony-2014. The vessel visited Tonga, Fiji, Vanuatu and Papua New Guinea, where it provided medical services to 22,456 people and 212 surgeries were performed.

The following year during Mission Harmony-2015, Peace Ark visited Australia, Barbados, French Polynesia, Grenada, Mexico, Peru, and the United States. It provided medical services and physical examinations for 17,838 people and performed 59 surgeries.

In 2017, Peace Ark traveled to Africa for Mission Harmony-2017, pausing at Djibouti (treating 7,841 Djiboutians), Sierra Leone, Gabon, the Republic of the Congo (treating 7,508 Congolese), Angola, Mozambique (treating 9,881 Mozambiquans), and Tanzania (treating 6,421 Tanzanians).

On June 29, 2018, Peace Ark set sail from a military port in Zhoushan, Zhejiang, to provide humanitarian medical services to 11 countries including Papua New Guinea, Vanuatu, Fiji, Tonga, Colombia, Venezuela, Grenada, Dominica, Antigua and Barbuda, and Ecuador, to carry out Mission Harmony-2018. It was also invited to Chile to participate in the celebration of the 200th anniversary of the founding of the Chilean Navy. On August 9 Peace Ark left the port of Suva, ending its 8-day visit to Fiji. On September 22, it arrived at the port of La Guaira and began an eight-day visit to Venezuela. On November 15, it arrived at the port of Guayaquil for an eight-day visit to Ecuador. On December 8, the visit to Chile ended and the ship left the port of Valparaíso to return home. On December 29, the Navy awarded Peace Ark a collective first-class merit. During the visits, a total of 50,884 people were diagnosed and treated, 26,231 people were assisted in examinations, 288 surgeries were performed, more than 20 joint emergency medical rescue drills, academic exchanges, and cultural exchanges were held with foreign parties, and multiple teams were sent to local hospitals, communities, military camps, etc. to carry out diagnosis and treatment services and environmental disinfection. On January 18, 2019, Peace Ark which completed Mission Harmony-2018, arrived at the military port of Zhoushan. The mission lasted 205 days, with a total voyage of 31,800 nautical miles (58,900 km; 36,600 mi).

On November 2, 2022, Peace Ark sail from a military port in Zhoushan, Zhejiang, for Mission Harmony-2022, visiting Indonesia and planning to provide medical services in Jakarta for 7 days. The ship's maritime hospital was composed of 111 medical staff drawn from the Naval Medical University, with a total of 14 clinical departments, 3 auxiliary departments and a pharmacy, and carried a ship-borne rescue helicopter. On the morning of November 29, Peace Arksuccessfully completed Mission Harmony-2022 and returned to China.

On July 3, 2023, Peace Ark set sail from a military port in Zhoushan, Zhejiang, to carry out Mission Harmony-2023. It paid friendly visits to five countries, namely Kiribati, Tonga, Vanuatu, Solomon Islands and Timor-Leste, and provided humanitarian medical services. From July 15 to 22, it visited Kiribati, providing medical services to local people and overseas Chinese. The main platform treated 5,095 patients, performed 20 surgeries, and conducted 94 health examinations. It also actively carried out health education activities. During the period, the hospital ship's medical staff delivered a baby for local people. Kiribati President Maamau personally named it "Akendari", which means "Peace Ark" in Kiribati. The hospital ship also sent 7 medical teams totaling 46 people to conduct medical rounds in local hospitals, communities, elderly associations and outer islands, serving 1,538 local people. On August 4, the visit and medical services to Tonga ended. On August 8, the ship arrived in Port Vila, Vanuatu, and began a 7-day visit and provided humanitarian medical services. On August 19, Peace Ark arrived in Honiara, the capital of the Solomon Islands. On September 3, the vessel began a 7-day visit and humanitarian medical services to Timor-Leste. In September, Peace Ark returned to a military port in Zhoushan after successfully completing Mission Harmony-2023. The mission lasted 79 days, with a total voyage of more than 12,000 nautical miles (22,000 km; 14,000 mi), and treated 41,358 people from various countries.

Peace Ark carried out Mission Harmony-2024 from mid-June 2024 to mid-January 2025. During the deployment, it visited 13 countries, including Seychelles, Tanzania, Madagascar, Mozambique, South Africa, Angola, Republic of the Congo, Gabon, Cameroon, Benin, Mauritania, Djibouti, and Sri Lanka, providing medical services to local populations. The ship also made port calls in France, Algeria, Singapore, and Greece. As of June 2024, Peace Ark has traveled abroad 11 times, sailed more than 280,000 nautical miles (520,000 km; 320,000 mi), served 45 countries and regions, provided medical services to more than 290,000 people, and performed more than 1,400 surgeries. On 21 December 2024, Daishan Dao (Peace Ark) arrived at the Port of Colombo, Sri Lanka, for an official visit under the command of Captain Deng Qiang. As part of the official visit, the hospital ship, in collaboration with the Embassy of the People's Republic of China in Sri Lanka, provided medical treatments and clinics onboard. These services were conducted by the vessel's medical staff in partnership with the Sri Lanka Navy medical department. The vessel departed the island following the conclusion of the visit on 28 December 2024.

On 7 January 2025, Daishan Dao arrived at Changi Naval Base for a 5-day visit.

== Characteristics ==
Daishan Dao is one of three ships of its class, and is assigned pennant number 866. She is assigned to the South Sea Fleet and based out of Zhoushan in Zhejiang province. She has a capacity of 300 beds, 20 ICU beds, 8 operating theatres, and can perform 40 major surgeries a day, in addition to X-ray, ultrasound, CT, hypothermia, hemodialysis, traditional Chinese medicine, and dental facilities. She is also equipped with a remote networking and communications system to allow teleconferencing with doctors and specialists on land.

In accordance with the Geneva Conventions, Daishan Dao and her crew do not carry any offensive weapons, while the ship is painted white with red crosses to mark her as a hospital ship.

== Gallery ==
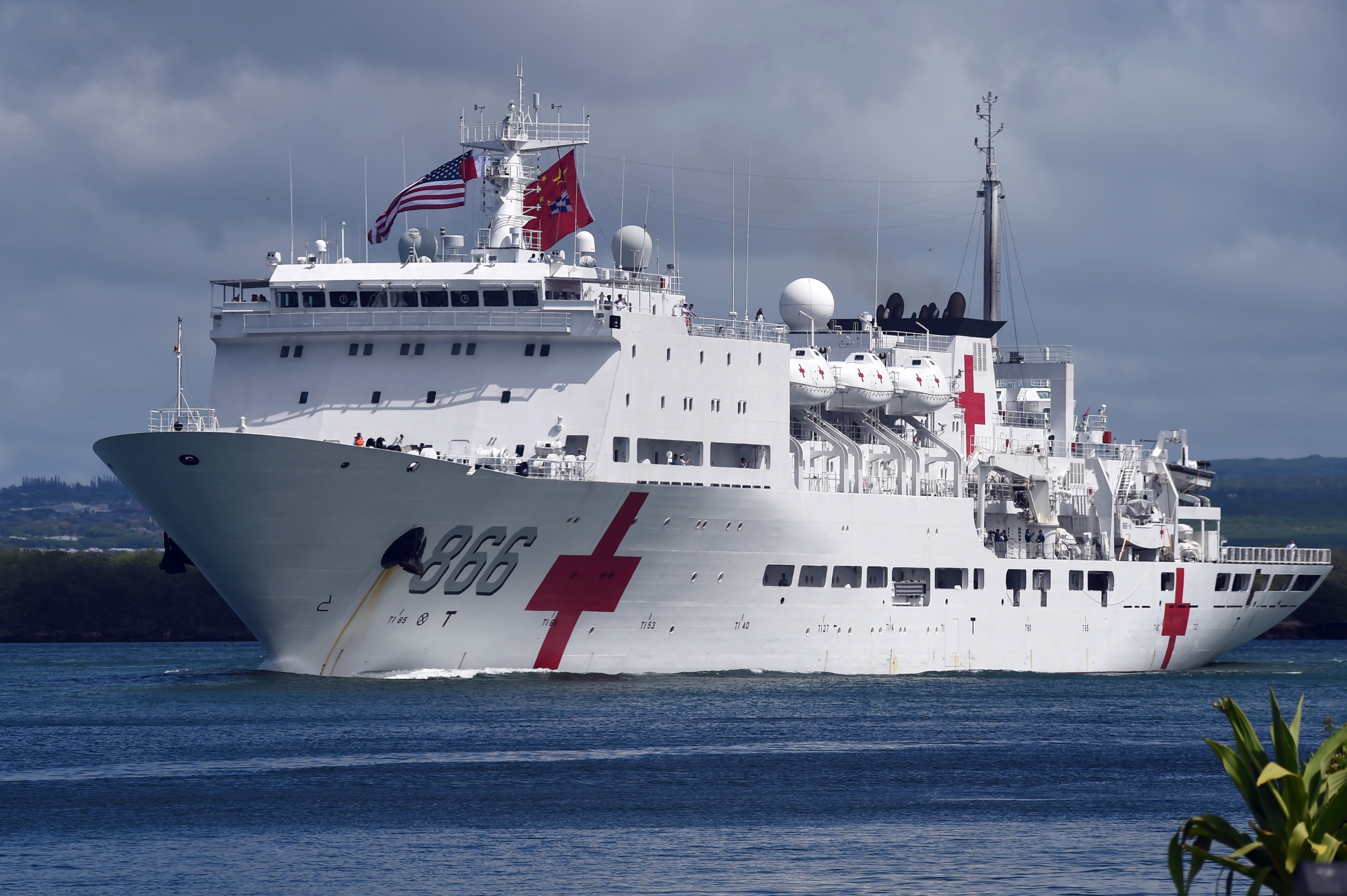
Peace Ark during Rim of the Pacific 2016.

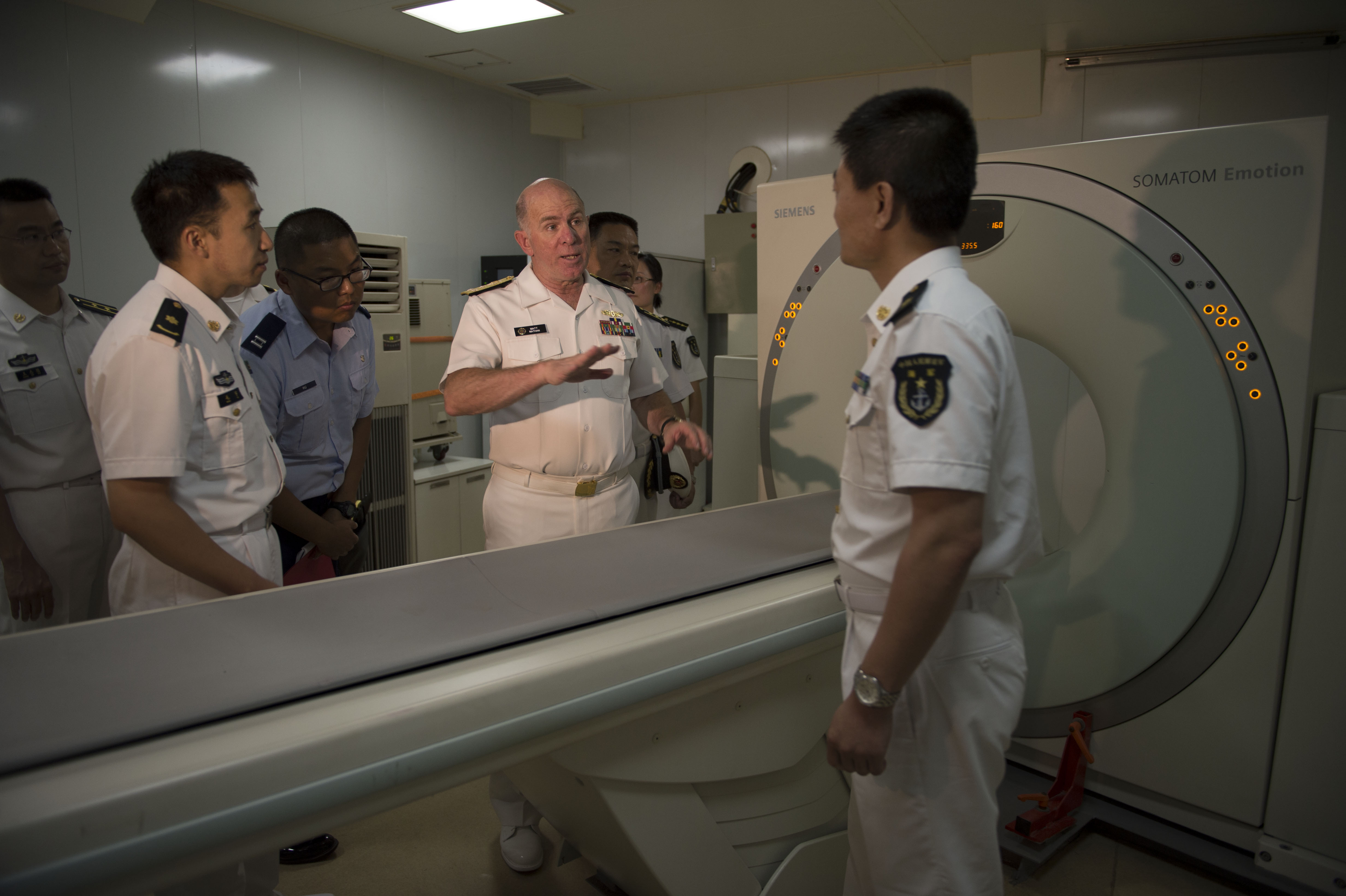
The computerized tomography (CT) scan aboard the Peace Ark

== Similar vessels ==
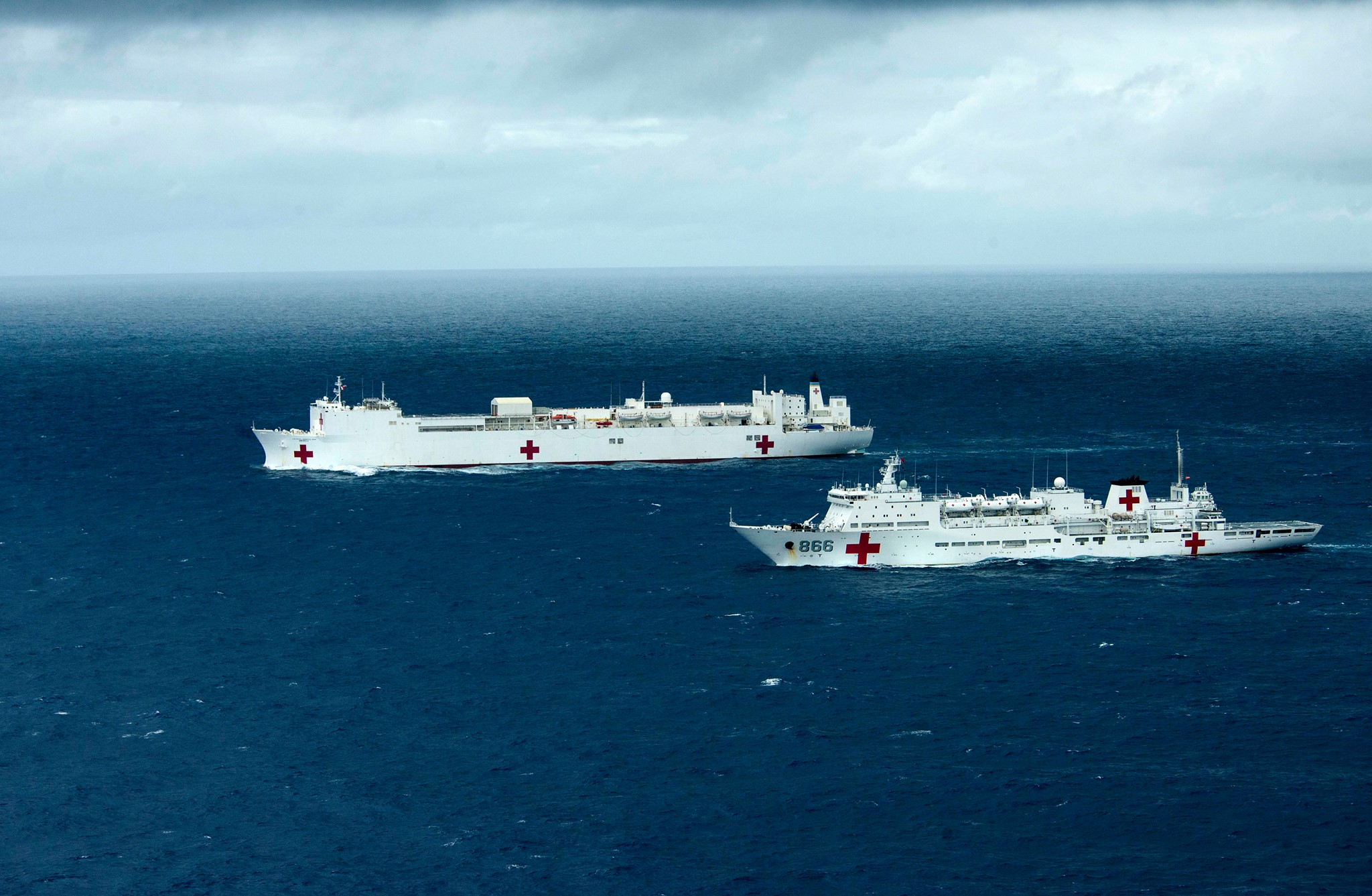
Peace Ark (front) and USNS Mercy sailing side by side.

- Other PLAN hospital ships:
  - 832 Nanyun and 833 Nankang - two Nankang-class hospital ship are 2150-ton modified Qiongsha class attack transport ships built in the 1980s and similar size to small passenger ships; has a helipad at the stern; built in Guangzhou and remains in service in the South Sea Fleet
  - Y832 (Bei Kang) and Y834 (Dong Kang) - stationed at North Sea Fleet and East Sea Fleet
  - 82 Shichang - 9 500 ton part-time hospital ship built in 1997 as multi-role aviation training ship and can be reclassified as hospital ship/defense mobilization ship with modular units added; deck space can accommodate modular units for treatment centre and wards; supports two helipads
  - 865 Zhuanghe - (approximately 30,000 ton) converted container ship with 14 modular medical units, heli pad and control tower; likely based at Sanya, Hainan Island
  - Ob-class hospital ship - a retired Russian hospital ship (1980–1997) was purchased in 2007 with plans to restore it for PLAN service as hospital ship; built at Adolf Warski Shipyard in the 1980s
- United States Navy 70,000 tons Mercy-class hospital ship:
  - USNS Mercy (T-AH-19)
  - USNS Comfort (T-AH-20)
