= Shichang =

Shichang could refer to:

== People ==
- Chen Shichang (born 2000), Chinese Paralympic long jumper
- Deng Shichang (Chinese: 邓世昌), Qing dynasty naval officer
- Wu Shichang (Chinese: 吴市场), nickname of Chinese economist Wu Jinglian
- Xu Shichang (Chinese: 徐世昌), former president of the Republic of China
- Zhang Shichang (Chinese: 张世昌; born 1989), Chinese football goalkeeper

== Other uses ==
- Chinese training ship Shichang, training ship in the People's Liberation Army Navy
- Shichang station (Chinese: 石厂站), in Yongding Town, Mentougou District, Beijing, China
- Shimen–Changsha railway, railway in Hunan Province, China
