= Hospital ship =

Ship designated as a medical treatment facility

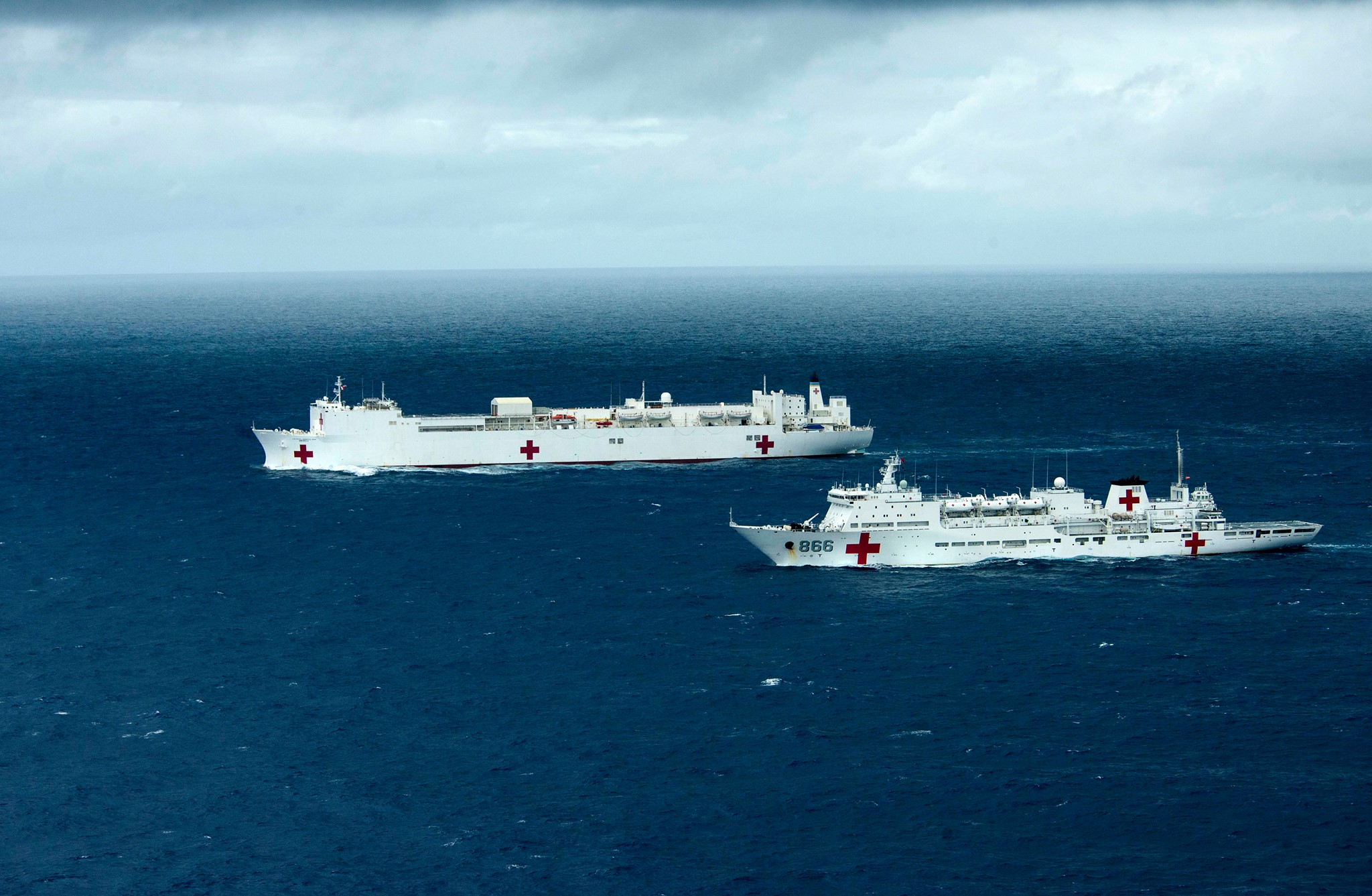
USNS Mercy (front) of the United States Navy and Peace Ark of the Chinese People's Liberation Army Navy sail side by side.

A hospital ship is a ship designated for primary function as a floating medical treatment facility or hospital. Most are operated by the military forces (mostly navies) of various countries, as they are intended to be used in or near war zones. In the 19th century, redundant warships were used as moored hospitals for seamen.

The Second Geneva Convention of 1949 prohibits military attacks on hospital ships that meet specified requirements, though belligerent forces have right of inspection and may take patients, but not staff, as prisoners of war.

== History ==
=== Early examples ===
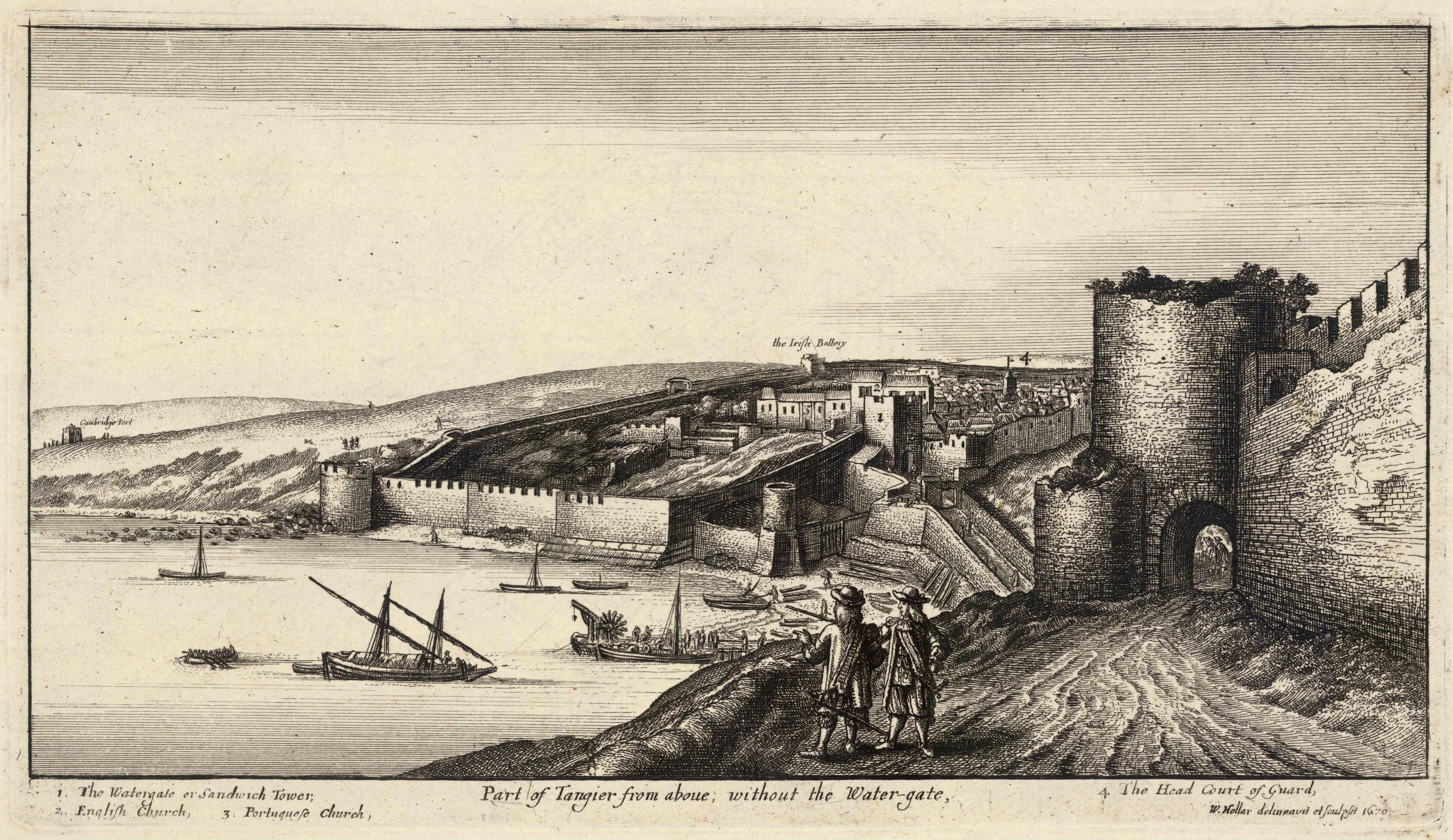
Tangier circa 1670. Hospital ships were used during the evacuation of the port in the 1680s.

Hospital ships possibly existed in ancient times. The Athenian Navy had a ship named Therapia, and the Roman Navy had a ship named Aesculapius, their names indicating that they may have been hospital ships. During the Renaissance, the Spanish employed an immense carrack, the capitana or flagship of the squad of Málaga, as a hospital ship during the 1535 conquest of Tunis. The carrack Santa Maria, owned by the Knights Hospitaller after her capture from the Mamluk fleet, is also described sometimes as a hospital ship, although in reality it was also used for combat.

The earliest British hospital ship may have been the vessel Goodwill, which accompanied a Royal Navy squadron in the Mediterranean in 1608 and was used to house the sick sent aboard from other ships. However this experiment in medical care was short-lived, with Goodwill assigned to other tasks within a year and her complement of convalescents simply left behind at the nearest port. It was not until the mid-seventeenth century that any Royal Navy vessels were formally designated as hospital ships, and then only two throughout the fleet. These were either hired merchant ships or elderly sixth rates, with the internal bulkheads removed to create more room, and additional ports cut through the deck and hull to increase internal ventilation.

In addition to their sailing crew, these seventeenth century hospital ships were staffed by a surgeon and four surgeon's mates. The standard issue of medical supplies was bandages, soap, needles and bedpans. Patients were offered a bed or rug to rest upon, and given a clean pair of sheets. These early hospital ships were for the care of the sick rather than the wounded, with patients quartered according to their symptoms and infectious cases quarantined from the general population behind a sheet of canvas. The quality of food was very poor. In the 1690s, the surgeon aboard Siam complained that the meat was in an advanced state of putrefaction, the biscuits were weevil-ridden and bitter, and the bread was so hard that it stripped the skin off patients' mouths.

Hospital ships were also used for the treatment of wounded soldiers fighting on land. An early example of this was during an English operation to evacuate English Tangier in 1683. An account of this evacuation was written by Samuel Pepys, an eyewitness. One of the main concerns was the evacuation of sick soldiers "and the many families and their effects to be brought off". The hospital ships Unity and Welcome sailed for England on 18 October 1683, with 114 invalid soldiers and 104 women and children, arriving at The Downs on 14 December 1683.

The number of medical personnel aboard Royal Navy hospital ships was slowly increased, with regulations issued in 1703 requiring that each vessel also carry six landsmen to act as surgical assistants, and four washerwomen. A 1705 amendment provided for a further five male nurses, and requisitions from the era suggest the number of sheets per patient was increased from one to two pairs. On 8 December 1798, unfit for service as a warship, HMS Victory was ordered to be converted to a hospital ship to hold wounded French and Spanish prisoners of war. According to Edward Hasted in 1798, two large hospital ships (also called lazarettos), (which were the surviving hulks of forty-four gun ships) were moored in Halstow Creek in Kent. The creek is an inlet from the River Medway and the River Thames. The crew of these vessels watched over ships coming to England, which were forced to stay in the creek under quarantine to protect the country from infectious diseases including the plague.

From 1821 to 1870, the Seamen's Hospital Society provided HMS Grampus, HMS Dreadnought and HMS Caledonia (later renamed Dreadnought) as successive hospital ships moored at Deptford in London. In 1866, HMS Hamadryad was moored in Cardiff as a seamen's hospital, replaced in 1905 by the Royal Hamadryad Seamen's Hospital. Other redundant warships were used as hospitals for convicts and prisoners of war.

=== Modern hospital ships ===
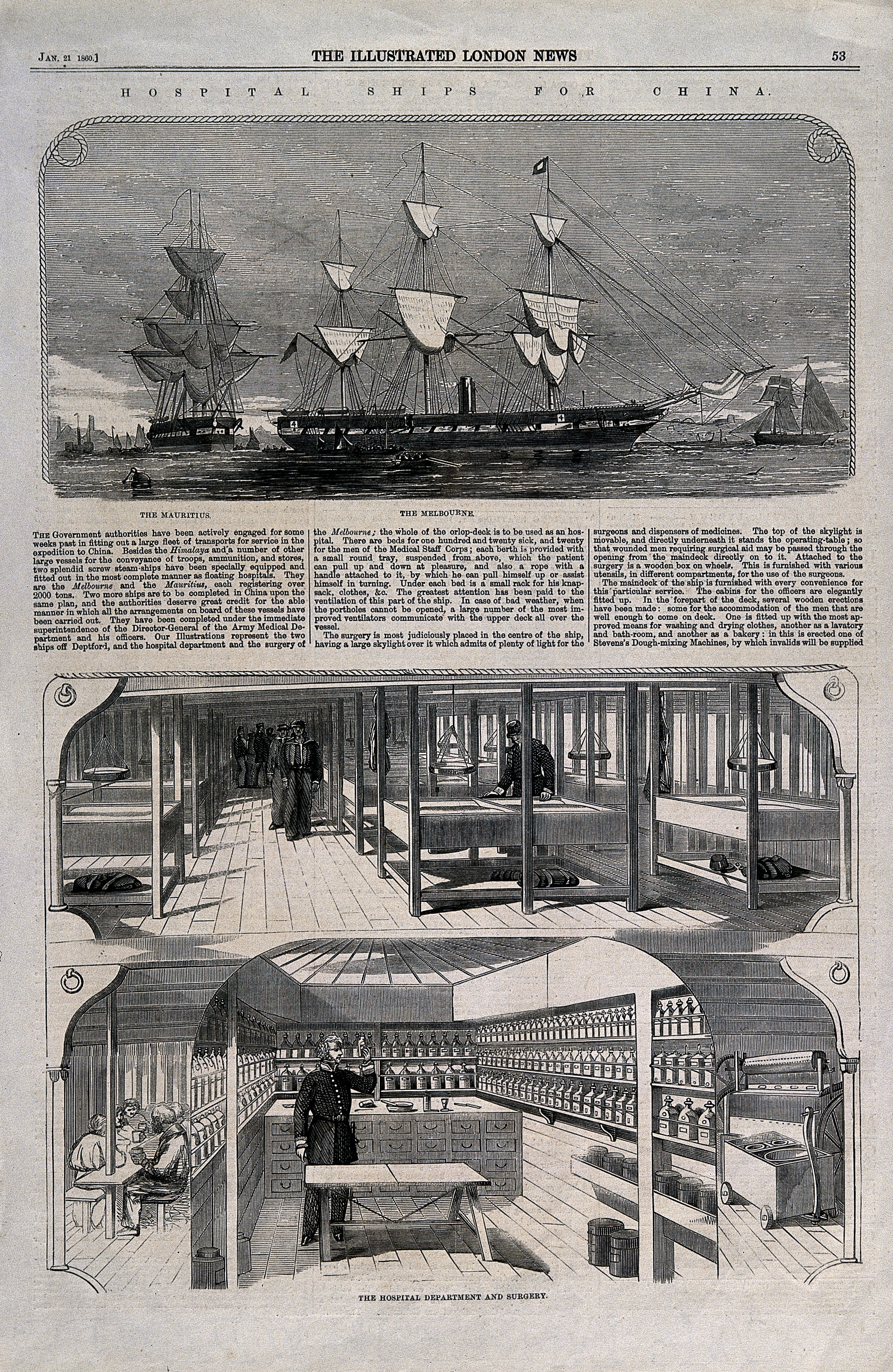
HMS Melbourne, the first modern hospital ship, served during the Second Opium War. Excerpt from The Illustrated London News about the ship (click to read).

The Royal Navy institutionalised the use of hospital ships during the first half of the nineteenth century. Hospital ships were generally superior in their standard of service and sanitation to the medical provision available at the time for convalescent soldiers. The modern hospital ship began to emerge during the Crimean War in the 1850s. The only military hospital available to the British forces fighting on the Crimean Peninsula was at Scutari near the Bosphorus. During the Siege of Sevastopol almost 15,000 wounded troops were transported there from the port at Balaklava by a squadron of converted hospital ships.

The first ships to be equipped with genuine medical facilities were the steamships HMS Melbourne and HMS Mauritius, staffed by the Medical Staff Corps and providing services to the British expedition to China in 1860. The ships provided relatively spacious accommodation for the patients, and were equipped with an operating theatre. Another early hospital ship was USS Red Rover in the 1860s, which aided the wounded soldiers of both sides during the American Civil War.

During the Russo-Turkish War (1877–78), the British Red Cross supplied a steel-hulled ship, equipped with modern surgery equipment including chloroform and other anaesthetics, and carbolic acid for antisepsis. Similar vessels accompanied the 1882 British invasion of Egypt and aided American personnel during the 1898 Spanish–American War.

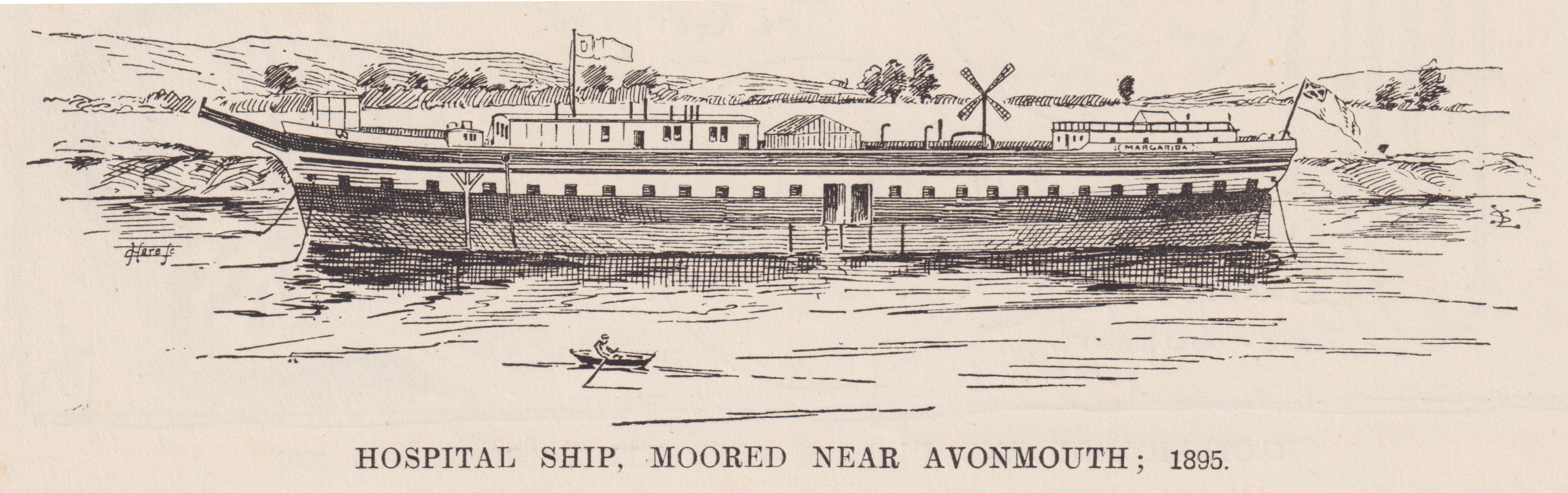
Hospital Ship, Avonmouth, Bristol Channel, 1895

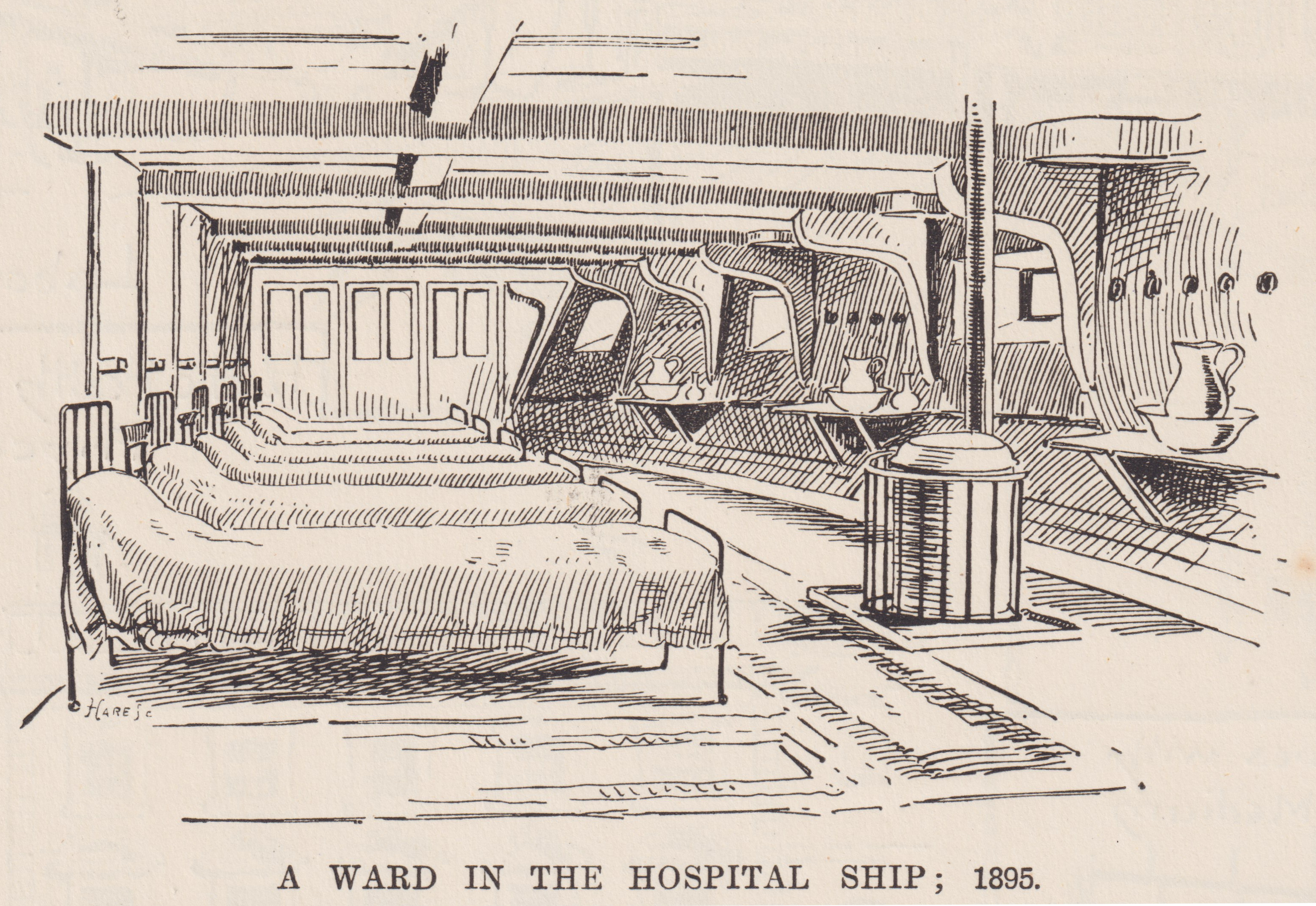

During a smallpox outbreak in London in 1883, the Metropolitan Asylum Board (MAB) chartered and later purchased from the Admiralty two ships, HMS Atlas and HMS Endymion, and a paddle-steamer, PS Castalia, which were moored in the Thames at Long Reach, near Dartford, and remained in service until 1903.

Hospital ships were used by both sides in the Russo-Japanese War of 1904–1905. The sighting by the Japanese of the Russian hospital ship Orel, illuminated in accordance with regulations for hospital ships, led to the decisive naval Battle of Tsushima. Orel was retained as a prize of war by the Japanese after the battle.

=== World Wars ===
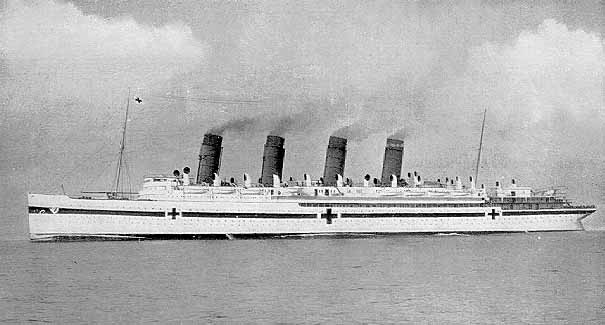
RMS Mauretania as hospital ship HMHS Mauretania during World War I.

During World War I and World War II, hospital ships were first used on a massive scale. Many passenger liners were converted for use as hospital ships. RMS Aquitania and HMHS Britannic were two famous examples of ships serving in this capacity. From inland locations, hospital barges could be used to transport the injured to the ships. By the end of the First World War, the British Royal Navy had 77 such ships in service. During the Gallipoli Campaign, hospital ships were used to evacuate wounded personnel to Egypt, Malta or England.

Canada operated hospital ships in both world wars. In World War I these included SS Letitia (I) and HMHS Llandovery Castle which was deliberately sunk by a German U-boat with great loss of life, despite the hospital ship's clearly marked status. In World War II, Canada operated the hospital ship RMS Lady Nelson and SS Letitia (II).

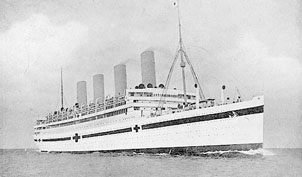
HMHS Aquitania in World War I service as a hospital ship.

The first purpose-built hospital ship in the U.S. Navy was USS Relief which was commissioned in 1921. During World War II both the United States Navy and Army operated hospital ships though with different purposes. Naval hospital ships were fully equipped hospitals designed to receive casualties direct from the battlefield and also supplied to provide logistical support to front line medical teams ashore. Army hospital ships were essentially hospital transports intended and equipped to evacuate patients from forward area Army hospitals to rear area hospitals or from those to the United States and were not equipped or staffed to handle large numbers of direct battle casualties. Three of the Navy hospital ships, USS Comfort, USS Hope, and USS Mercy, were less elaborately equipped than other Navy hospital ships, medically staffed by Army medical personnel and similar in purpose to the Army model.

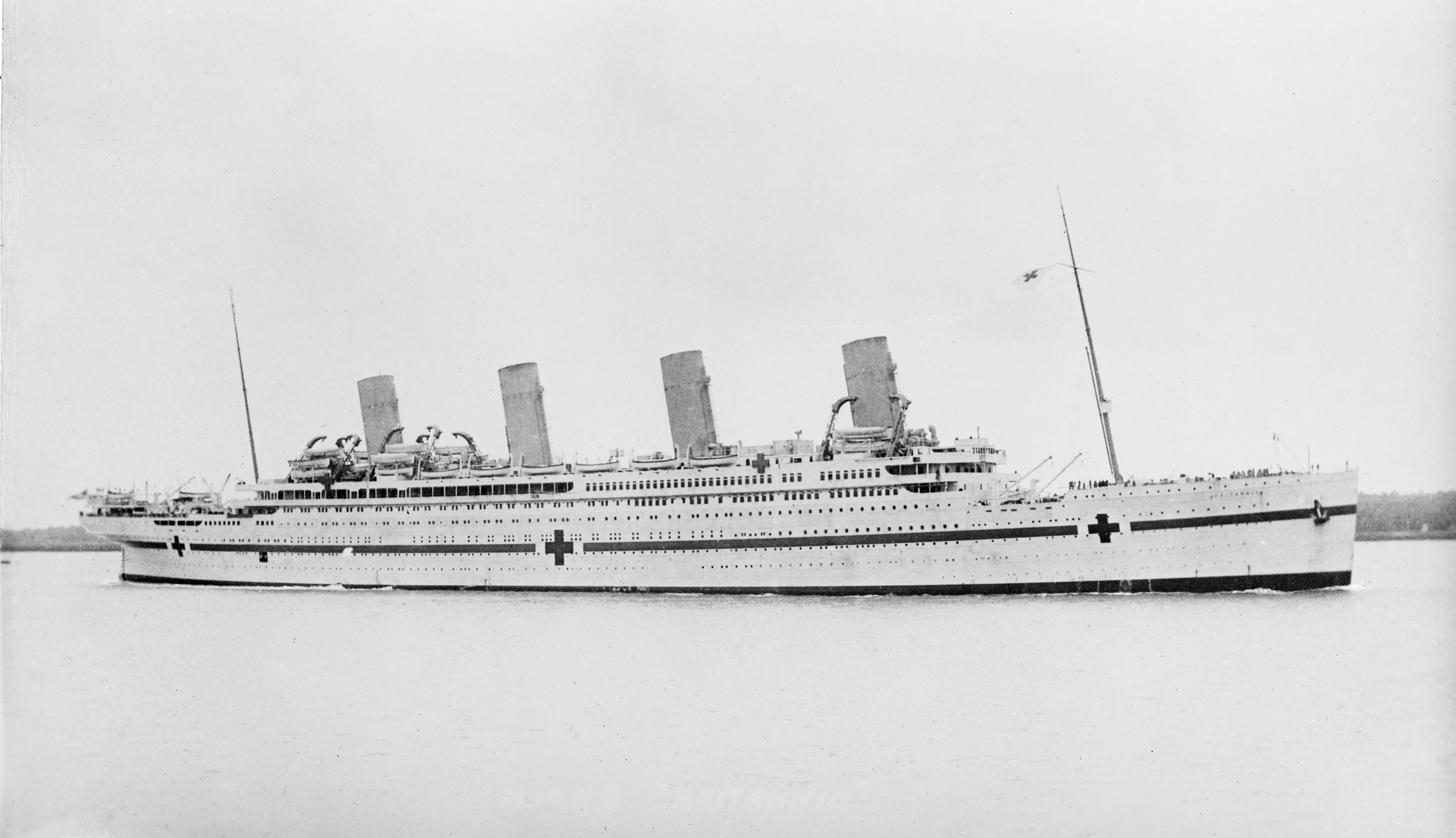
Britannic (youngest sister of Titanic and Olympic) after conversion to a hospital ship during World War I.

The last British royal yacht, the post World War II HMY Britannia, was constructed in a way as to be convertible to a hospital ship in wartime. After her decommissioning, Peter Hennessy discovered that her actual role would have been as Queen Elizabeth II's refuge from nuclear weapons, hiding amidst the lochs of western Scotland.

A development of the Lun-class ekranoplan was planned for use as a mobile field hospital for rapid deployment to any ocean or coastal location at a speed of 297 knots (550 km/h, 341.8 mph). Work was 90% complete on this model, Spasatel, but Soviet military funding ceased and it was never completed.

Some hospital ships, such as SS Hope and Esperanza del Mar, belong to civilian agencies, and do not belong to a navy. Mercy Ships is an international non-governmental charity (or NGO).

== International law ==
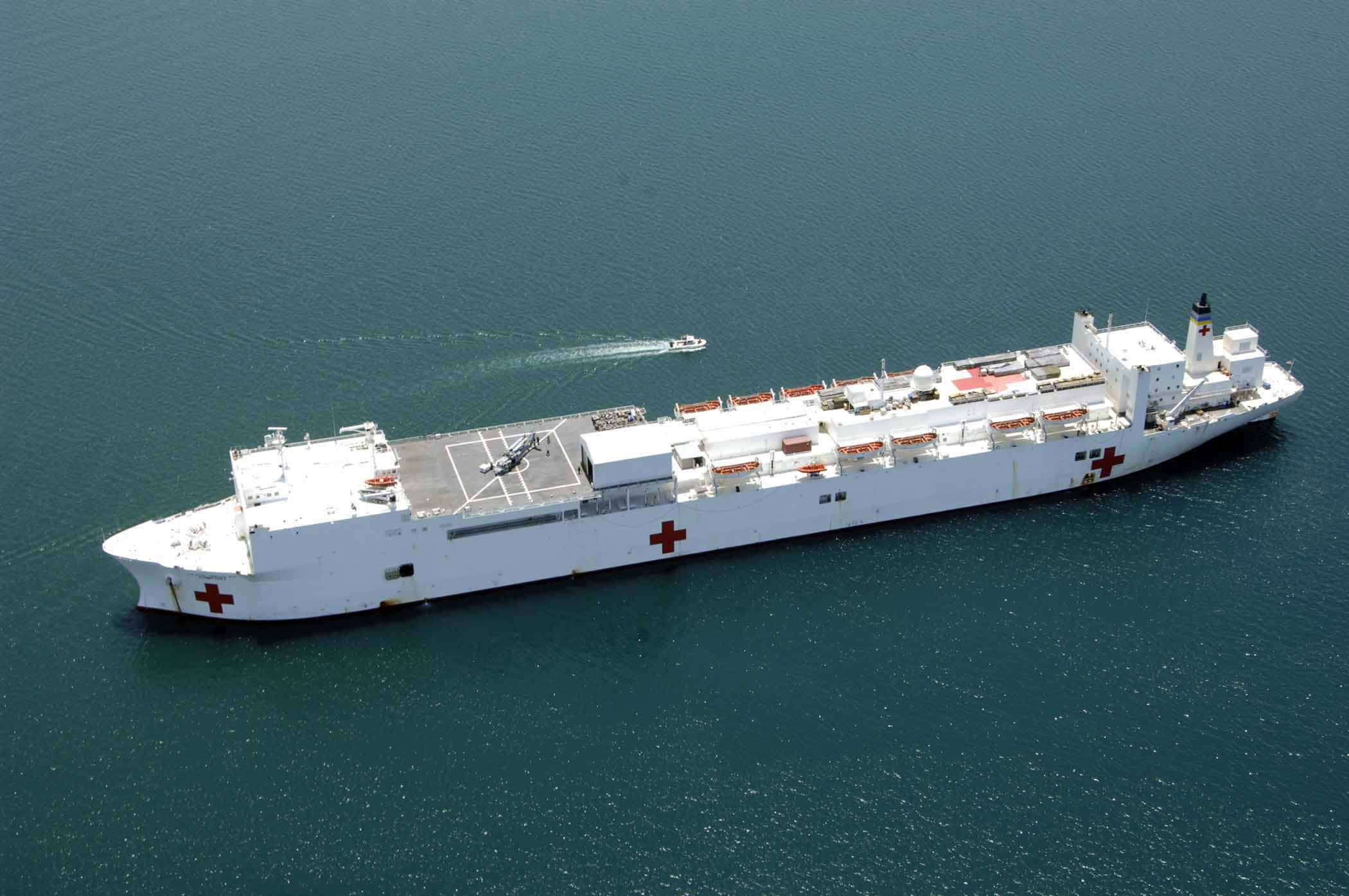
United States Navy hospital ship USNS Comfort in 2009.

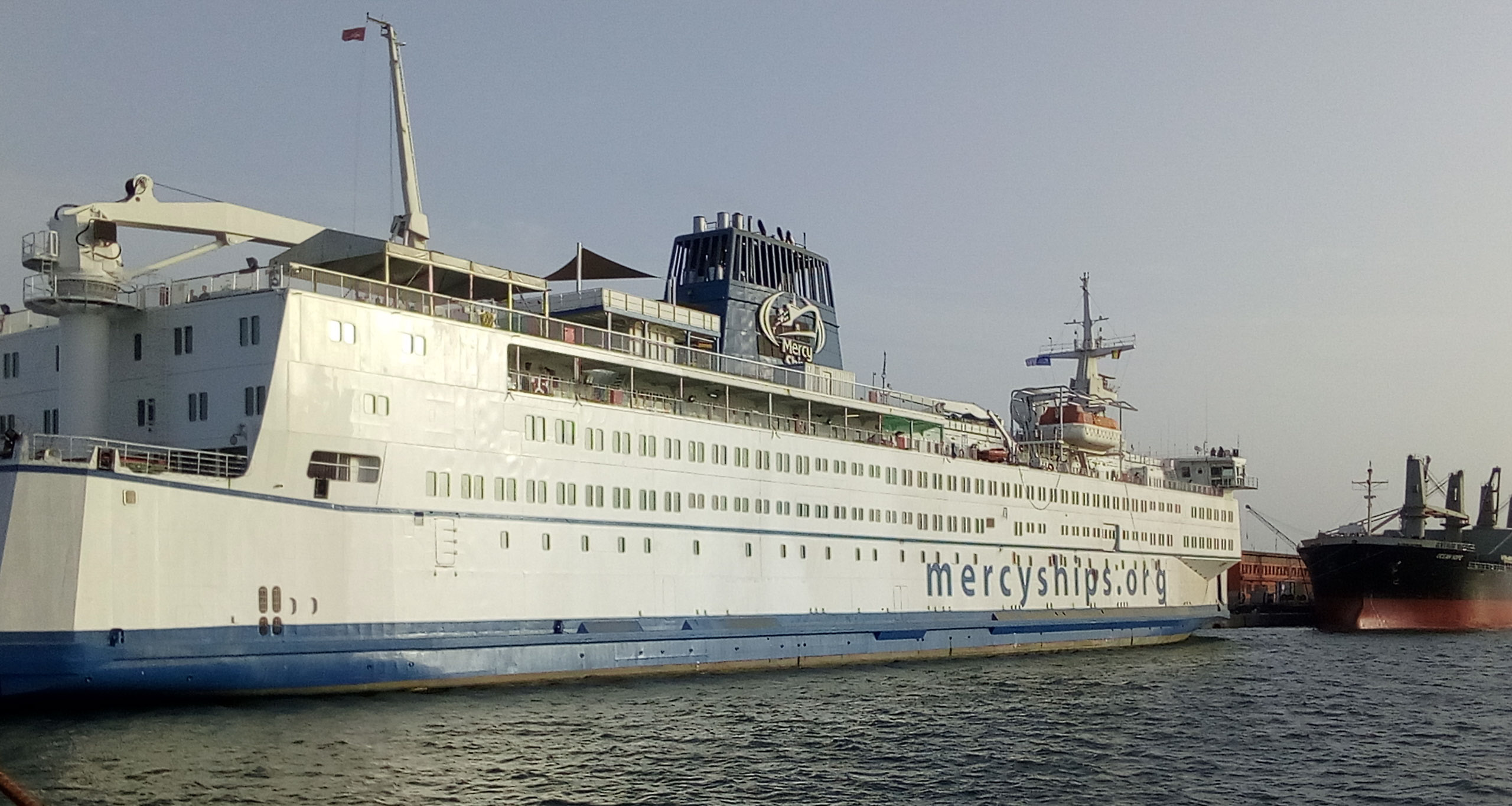
Non-government hospital ship MV Africa Mercy

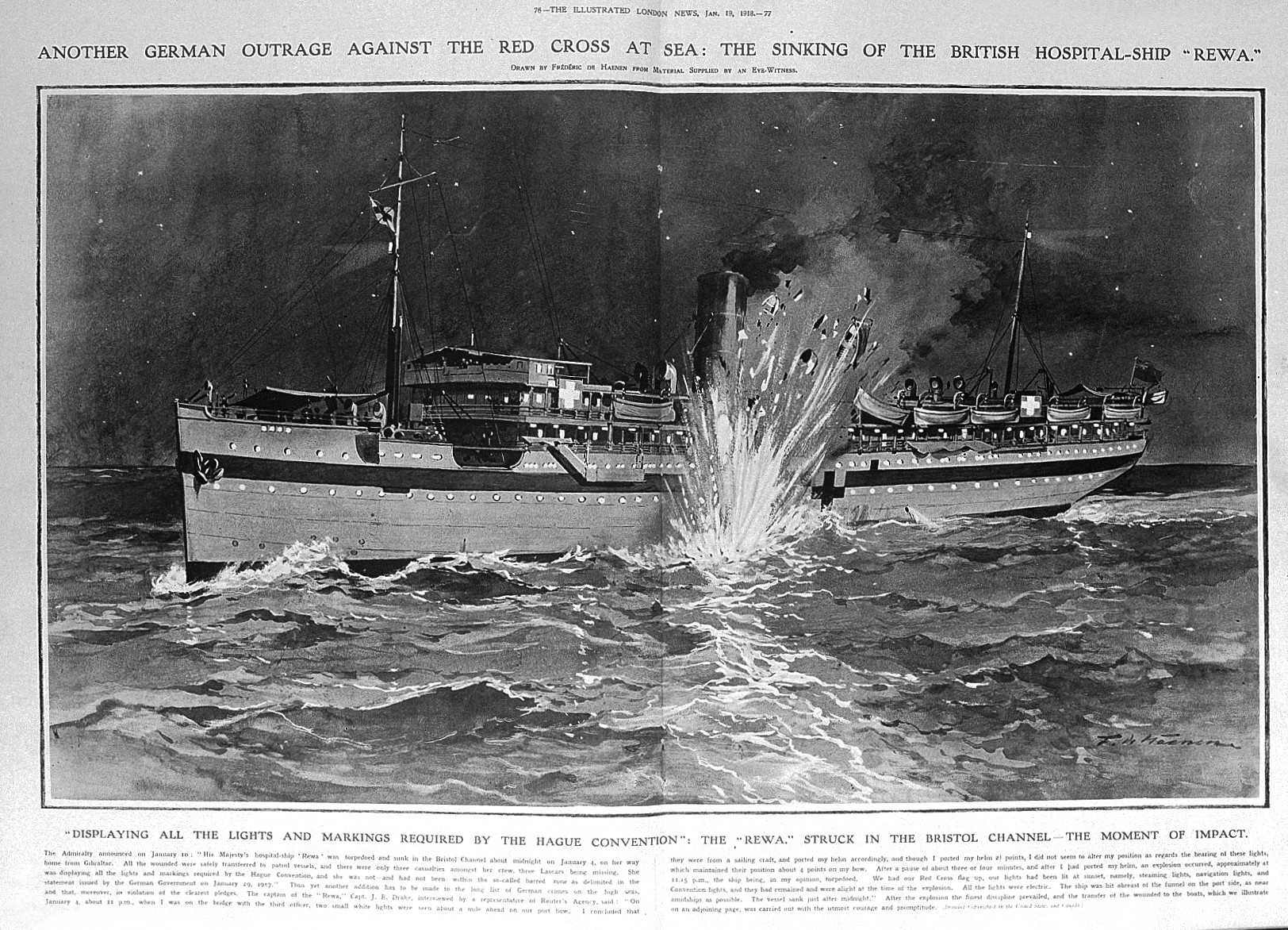
A depiction of the sinking of the British hospital ship HMHS Rewa from The Illustrated London News. On 4 January 1918, she was hit and sunk by a torpedo from the German U-boat SM U-55, an act that constituted a war crime.

Hospital ships were covered under the Hague Convention X of 1907. Articles of the Hague Convention X specified the provisions for a hospital ship:

- Hospital-ships must be painted white. Military hospital ships must have a green band; ships operated by approved relief societies and similar must have a red band.
- Ships must fly a red cross flag in addition to their national flag.
- The ship should give medical assistance to wounded personnel of all nationalities.
- The ship must not be used for any military purpose, or interfere with or hamper enemy combatant vessels.
- Belligerents, as designated by the Hague Convention, can search any hospital ship to investigate violations of the above restrictions.

According to the San Remo Manual on International Law Applicable to Armed Conflicts at Sea, a hospital ship violating legal restrictions must be duly warned and given a reasonable time limit to comply. If a hospital ship persists in violating restrictions, a belligerent is legally entitled to capture it or take other means to enforce compliance. A non-complying hospital ship may only be fired on under the following conditions:

- Diversion or capture is not feasible
- No other method to exercise control is available
- The violations are grave enough to allow the ship to be classified as a military objective
- The damage and casualties will not be disproportionate to the military advantage.

In all other circumstances, attacking a hospital ship is a war crime.

Modern hospital ships display large Red Crosses or Red Crescents to signify their Geneva Convention protection under the laws of war. Even so, marked vessels have not been completely free from attack. Notable examples of hospital ships deliberately attacked during wartime are HMHS Llandovery Castle in 1915, the Soviet hospital ship Armenia in 1941, and AHS Centaur in 1943.

== Current hospital ships ==
As of the early 21st century, hospital ships remain in limited but active service, primarily operated by naval forces and humanitarian organizations rather than as commercial vessels.

While any ship can be designated and marked as a hospital ship, many ships are permanently dedicated to that function.

=== Current military hospital ships ===
Military hospital ships
Navy	Ship (class)	Year	Capacity	Capabilities	Image
Brazil	U15 Pará	2005			
Brazil	U16 Doutor Montenegro	2000		2 personnel transport boats, 3 medical examination rooms, 2 dental offices, laboratory, pharmacy, X-ray, 2 inpatient wards, 1 operating room, 1 emergency room, and ICU.	
Brazil	U18 Oswaldo Cruz (Oswaldo Cruz)	1984		2 personnel transport boats, 2 outpatient clinics, 2 dental offices, laboratory, pharmacy, X-ray, 2 inpatient wards, and 1 operating room.	
Brazil	U19 Carlos Chagas (Oswaldo Cruz)	1984		2 personnel transport boats, 2 outpatient clinics, 2 dental offices, laboratory, pharmacy, X-ray, 2 inpatient wards, and 1 operating room.	
Brazil	U21 Soares de Meirelles	2009		Medical and dental examination rooms, pharmacy, vaccination room, X-ray room, surgical suite, inpatient ward, and laboratory.	
Brazil	U28 Tenente Maximiano	2010		Operating suite, inpatient ward, sterilization room, decontamination room, pharmacy, laboratory, medical examination room, dental offices and dental X-ray machine.	
Brazil	U170 Anna Nery	2026		Six medical and dental examination rooms, a surgical suite for minor procedures, diagnostic imaging services, including mammography, X-rays and ultrasound, pharmacy, laboratory, and inpatient beds.	
Brazil	U220 Sargento Lima	2025		Medical and dental examination rooms, vaccination room, inpatient ward, and pharmacy.	
China	Nankang (833) (Qiongsha)			Classed as an "ambulance transport"	
China	Zhuanghe (865)	2004		Classed as a "medical evacuation ship", converted container ship with 14 "medical modules"	
China	Daishan Dao (866) (Type 920)	2008	300 hospital beds, 20 intensive care beds	8 operating theatres, X-ray, ultrasound, CT, hypothermia, hemodialysis, traditional Chinese medicine, and dental facilities	
China	Nanyi (12) (Anshen)	2020		Classed as a "medium sized hospital ship"	
China	tba (13) (Anshen)	2020		Classed as a "medium sized hospital ship"	
Indonesia	KRI dr. Soeharso (990) (Tanjung Dalpele)	2003	Former (LPD), capable of receiving up to 2000 patients	5 operating rooms, 6 polyclinics, 51 medical specialists	
Indonesia	KRI dr. Wahidin Sudirohusodo (991) (Sudirohusodo)	2021	Full load 7,200 tons, up to 643 personnels, 159 patients, 4 ambulances (OFE), 3 mobile hospitals (OFE), 1 mobile decompression (OFE), 1 mobile X Ray (OFE) as well as 2 LCVP units, 1 RHIB unit and 2 Ambulance Boat units.	2 ERs, 5 ORs (+ Pre/ Post), ICU, HCU, X-ray & CT-scanner, Pharmacy, 8 Polyclinics, a morgue and Laboratory.	
Indonesia	KRI dr. Radjiman Wedyodiningrat (992) (Sudirohusodo)	2023	124 Beds, additional 350 Beds in Emergency Case	2 ERs, 5 ORs (+ Pre/ Post), ICU, HCU, X-ray & CT-scanner, Pharmacy, 8 Polyclinics, a morgue and Laboratory.	
Myanmar	UMS Shwe Pu Zun	2012	25	1 CT scanner, 1 minor eye operation room, 1 minor operation theater, 1 major operation theater, and 1 intensive care unit	
Myanmar	UMS Thanlwin	2015	25	1 CT scanner, 1 minor eye operation room, 1 minor operation theater, 1 major operation theater, and 1 intensive care unit	
Peru	BAP Puno	1976		Converted 1861 steamship, found on Lake Titicaca	
Russia	Yenisey (Ob)	1981	100	7 operating rooms	
Russia	Svir (Ob)	1989	100	7 operating rooms	
Russia	Irtysh (Ob)	1990	100	7 operating rooms	
United States	USNS Mercy (Mercy)	1986	1,000	12 operating rooms, digital radiological services, a medical laboratory, a pharmacy, an optometry lab, an intensive care ward, dental services, a CT scanner, a morgue, 2 oxygen-producing plants	
United States	USNS Comfort (Mercy)	1987	1,000	12 operating rooms, digital radiological services, a medical laboratory, a pharmacy, an optometry lab, an intensive care ward, dental services, a CT scanner, a morgue, 2 oxygen-producing plants	
Vietnam	Khánh Hòa - 01 (Hospital Ship 561)	2013	200	Operating room with satellite connected, intensive care, pressure isolation room, medical laboratory, treatment room, defibrillator room, dental service, Endoscopic room, pharmacy, radiology.	

=== Current non-military hospital ships ===
Non-military hospital ships
Agency/NGO	Ship (class)	Year	Capacity	Capabilities	Image
Mercy Ships	MV Africa Mercy	Converted 2007	82	5 operating theaters, 1 intensive care unit, 1 ophthalmic unit, a CT scanner, x-ray, laboratories	
Mercy Ships	MV Global Mercy	2022	199	6 operating theatres, 102 acute care beds, 7 ICU beds, and 90 self-care beds. The hospital also features dedicated classroom spaces and simulator labs with state-of-the-art technology for enhanced training of local medical professionals.	
Ministry of Labour (Spain)	Esperanza del Mar	2001	17	1 operating theatre, ICU facility	
Ministry of Labour (Spain)	Juan de la Cosa	2006	10	1 operating theatre, ICU facility	

== Other shipborne hospitals ==
It is common for naval ships, especially large ships such as aircraft carriers and amphibious assault ships to have on-board hospitals. However, they are only one small part of the vessel's overall capability, and are used primarily for the ship's crew and its amphibious forces (and occasionally for relief missions). A warship with hospital facilities does not have the protected status of a hospital ship. A primary example of the varied military-based hospital services available at sea is found aboard several types of US naval ships;

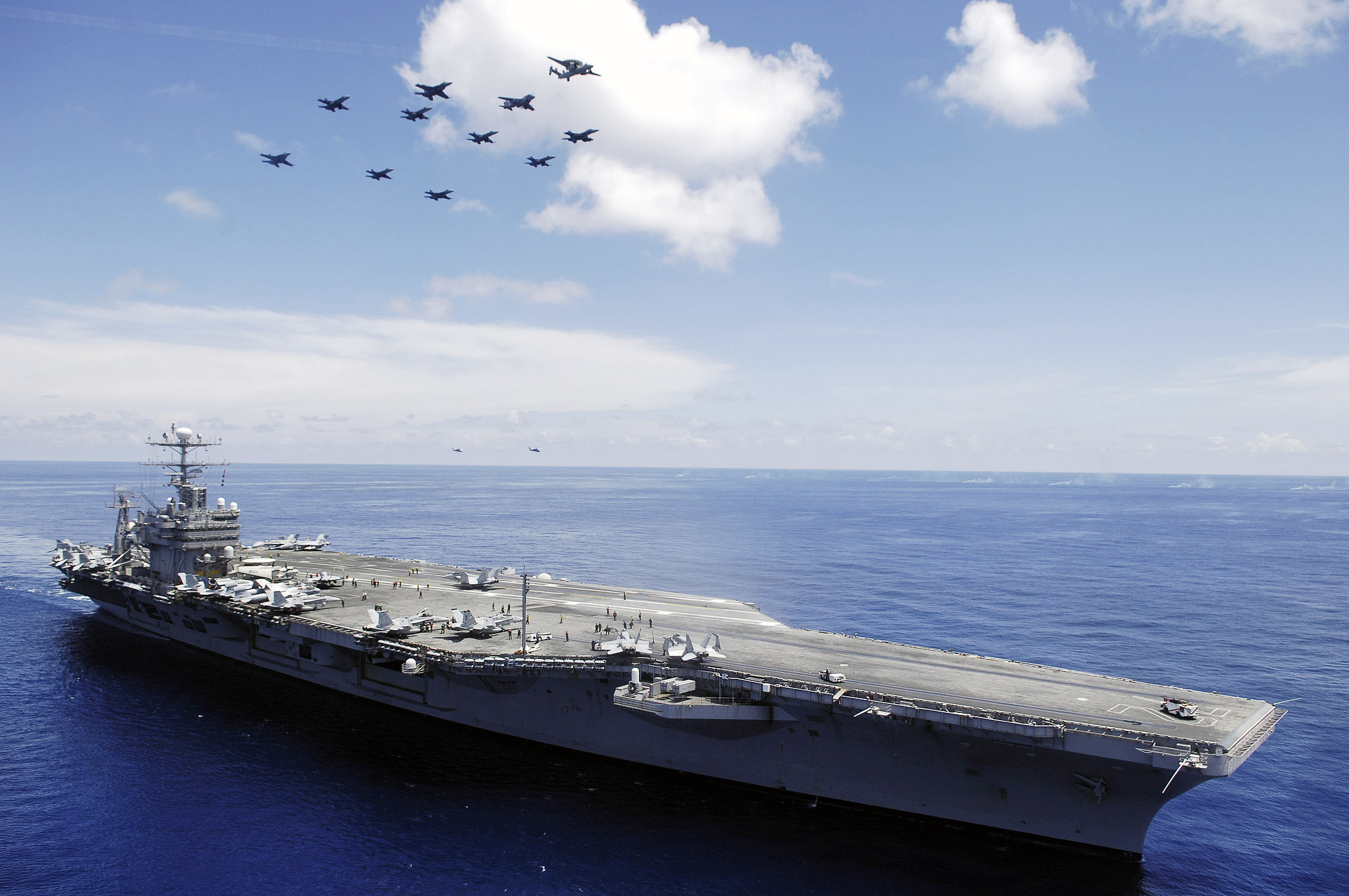
USS Abraham Lincoln, a Nimitz-class aircraft carrier

United States Navy;

- Gerald R. Ford-class aircraft carrier – USS Gerald R. Ford, first in the class, has an on-board hospital that includes a full lab, pharmacy, operating room, 3-bed intensive care unit, 2-bed emergency room, and 41-bed hospital ward, staffed by 11 medical officers and 30 hospital corpsmen.
- Nimitz-class aircraft carrier – Each carrier has a 53-bed hospital ward and a three-bed ICU, and acts as the hospital ship for the entire carrier strike group. In one year, the medical department of USS George Washington handled over 15,000 out-patient visits, drew almost 27,000 labs, filled almost 10,000 prescriptions, took about 2,300 x-rays and performed 65 surgical operations. There is not much variation among the ships of the class. The first ship, USS Nimitz has 53 beds, plus 3 ICU beds, and the last ship, USS George H.W. Bush has 51 beds, plus 3 ICU beds.

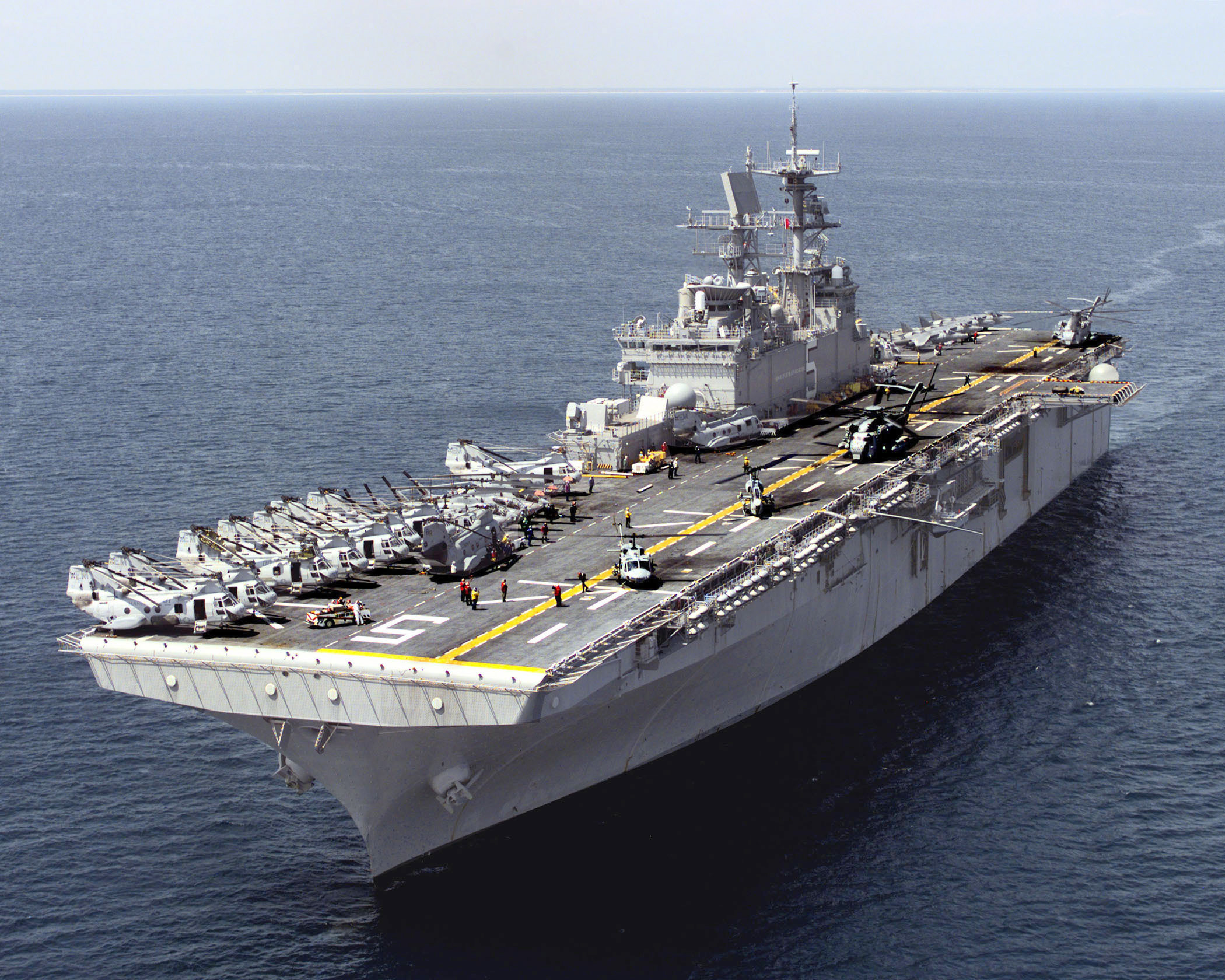
USS Bataan, a Wasp-class amphibious assault ship

- Wasp-class amphibious assault ship (LHD) – These ships have 6 operating rooms, 14 ICU beds, 46 hospital beds, 4 battle dressing stations, medical imaging (i.e.:X-ray), a fully functional laboratory, and a blood bank. The ship can expand its medical complement to 600 beds, making it the second largest hospital at sea, second only to actual hospital ships.
- America-class amphibious assault ship (LHA) – This is the newest and largest class both in the USN and the world. However, the first two ships of the class, USS America and USS Tripoli, had the size of their medical facilities reduced, in favour of larger aviation facilities. The on-board hospitals of these first two vessels will have 2 operating rooms and 24 beds. It is unknown if this design change will affect the expanded capability for additional beds, nor what size the medical facilities of future ships of the class will be.
- San Antonio-class amphibious transport dock (LPD) – 24 hospital beds.
- Harpers Ferry-class dock landing ship (LSD) – 11 hospital beds.
- Whidbey Island-class dock landing ship (LSD) – 8 hospital beds.
- Bethesda-class expeditionary medical ship (EMS) - Will have four operating rooms and 124 medical beds, separated into acute care, acute isolation, ICU, and ICU isolation spaces.

More examples from various other national navies include;

(Argentina) Argentine Navy

- ARA Almirante Irízar – Icebreaker which can be deployed as a hospital ship.

(Australia) Royal Australian Navy

- Canberra-class landing helicopter dock – This class is based on the Juan Carlos I-class design, and has 2 operating rooms and a hospital ward.

(Canada) Royal Canadian Navy's future Protecteur-class replenishment oiler are based on the German Berlin-class ships will have medical facilities including operating rooms, labs, pharmacy and patient (45) beds. The interim support vessel MV Asterix have the similar medical features (5 hospital beds).

(China) People's Liberation Army Navy

- Several armed Qiongsha-class cargo ships are fitted out as "ambulance transports".
- Shichang – a multi-role training ship built in 1997. Deck space can accommodate modular medical units and can be used as a medical treatment facility, but the primary role is aviation training. The layout is very similar to RFA Argus (see below).

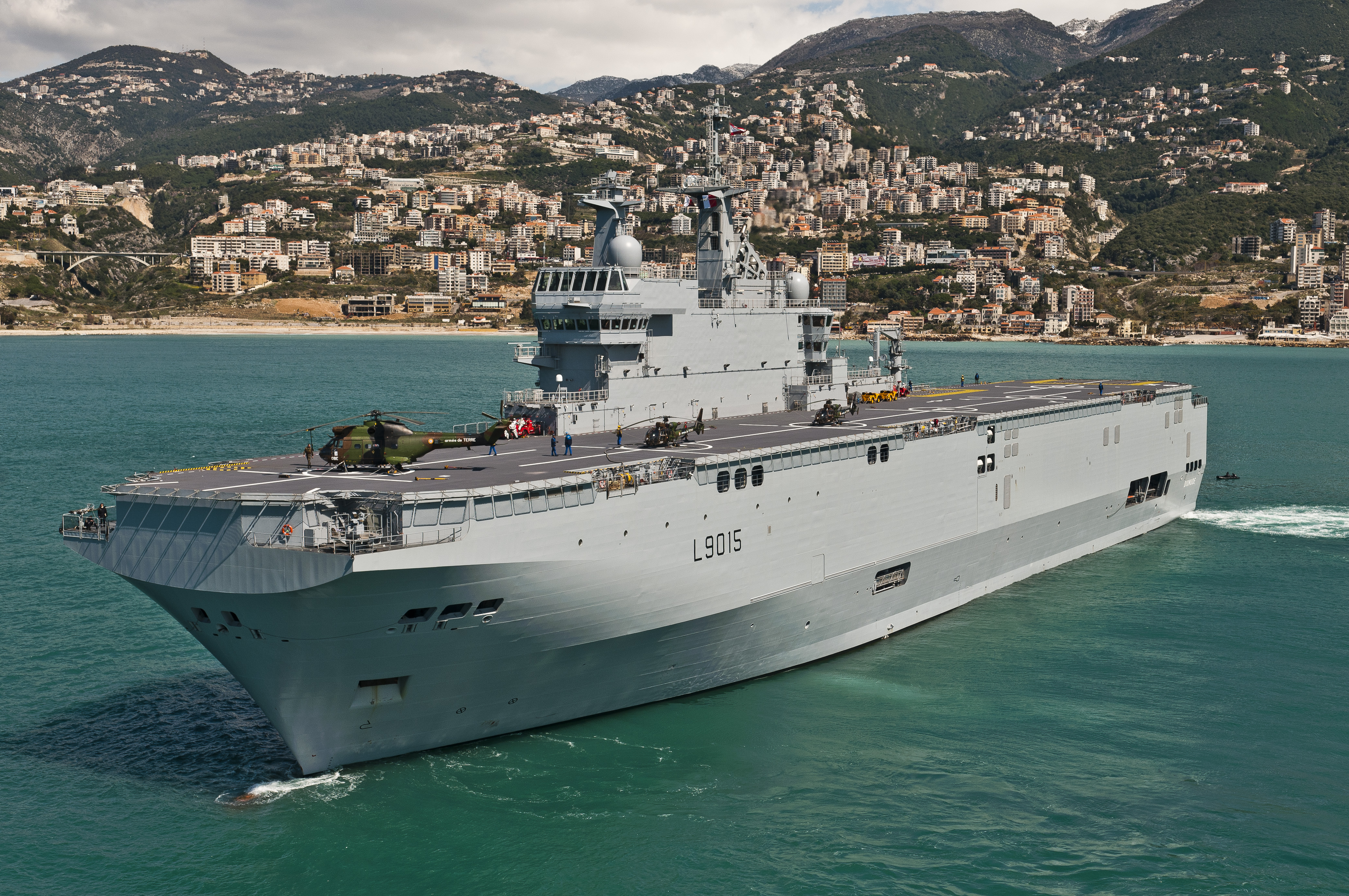
Dixmude, a Mistral-class amphibious assault ship

(France) French Navy

- Mistral-class amphibious assault ship – On board hospital is NATO Echelon level-3, with 69 hospital beds, 7 ICU beds, and an additional 50 beds if needed. The ship also has medical imaging capabilities, such as X-ray, CT-scan and ultrasound.

(Italy) Italian Navy

- Cavour aircraft carrier – Has an on-board hospital with 2 operating rooms, 1 intensive care unit, laboratory, pharmacy and a 32-bed hospital ward.
- Etna logistic ship – On-board hospital is NATO ROLE-level 2+, with operating room, intensive care unit and a laboratory.

Japan Maritime Self-Defense Force

- Izumo-class helicopter destroyer – These ships have 2 operating rooms, 2 ICU beds, 35 hospital beds, 1 battle dressing station and several medical imaging (i.e.:X-ray) stations.
- Hyūga-class helicopter destroyer – These ships have 1 operating room, 1 ICU bed, 8 hospital beds.
- Ōsumi-class tank landing ship - These ships have 1 operating room, 2 ICU beds, 6 hospital beds.

(Spain) Spanish Navy

- Juan Carlos I – Has a 40-bed hospital on board.

(United Kingdom) Royal Navy

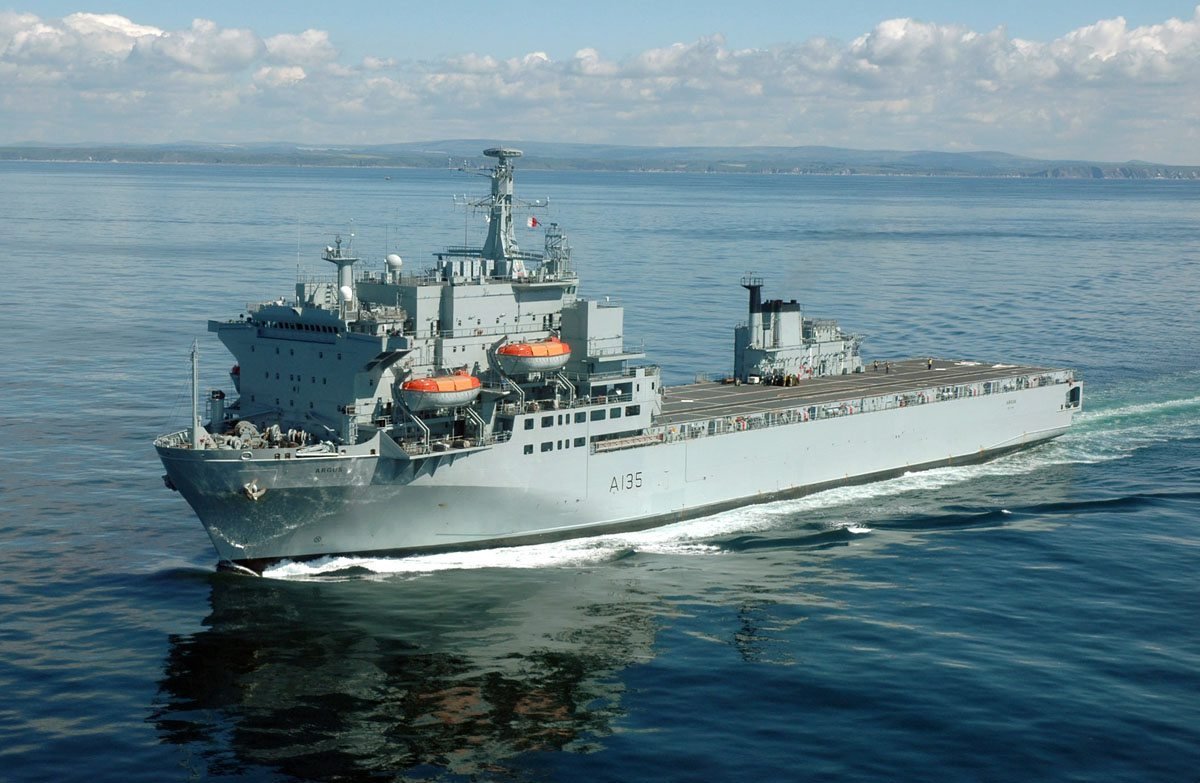
RFA Argus (A-135), circa 2007

- Royal Fleet Auxiliary ship RFA Argus – This ship would be a hospital ship were it not for its armaments. However, it is instead designated as a 'Primary Casualty Receiving Ship' (PCRS). The vessel is classed as a NATO ROLE 3 Medical support vessel and is to be replaced in 2024
- Royal Fleet Auxiliary Bay Class ships have a 14-bed medical facility which has the capability of being expanded in times of crisis as well as an operating theatre. The vessels are a classed as NATO Role 2 Medical support capable vessels.

(Germany) German Navy

- Berlin-class replenishment ship Berlin - Equipped with a container based version of the large modular hospital MERZ which stands for Marineeinsatzrettungszentrum (Englisch: Maritime Rescue Center) capable of holding 45 patients, plus 4 intensive care beds, clinical and microbiological laboratory and sterilisers.
- Berlin-class replenishment ship Frankfurt am Main - Following a fire destroying the Frankfurt's MERZ, the Navy opted to equip the Frankfurt am Main with a new generation integrated MERZ (iMERZ), build into the hull of the ship. It's equipped with two operating rooms, medical imaging capabilities and a hospital ward. The German Navy plans to equip the Frankfurt's two sister ships with an iMERZ during routine maintenance.

== See also ==
Lists

- List of hospital ships sunk in World War I
- List of hospital ships sunk in World War II
- List of hospital ships of the Australian Navy
- List of hospital ships of the Brazilian Navy
- List of hospital ships of the Chinese Navy
- List of hospital ships of the Royal Navy
- List of hospital ships of the United States Navy
- List of hospital ships of the United States Army
- List of hospital ships of the United States Sanitary Commission

Others

- Mercy Ships
- Hospital train
- Hague Convention on Hospital Ships
- Hospital ships designated for the COVID-19 pandemic
- Women on Waves
