= Esperanza del Mar =

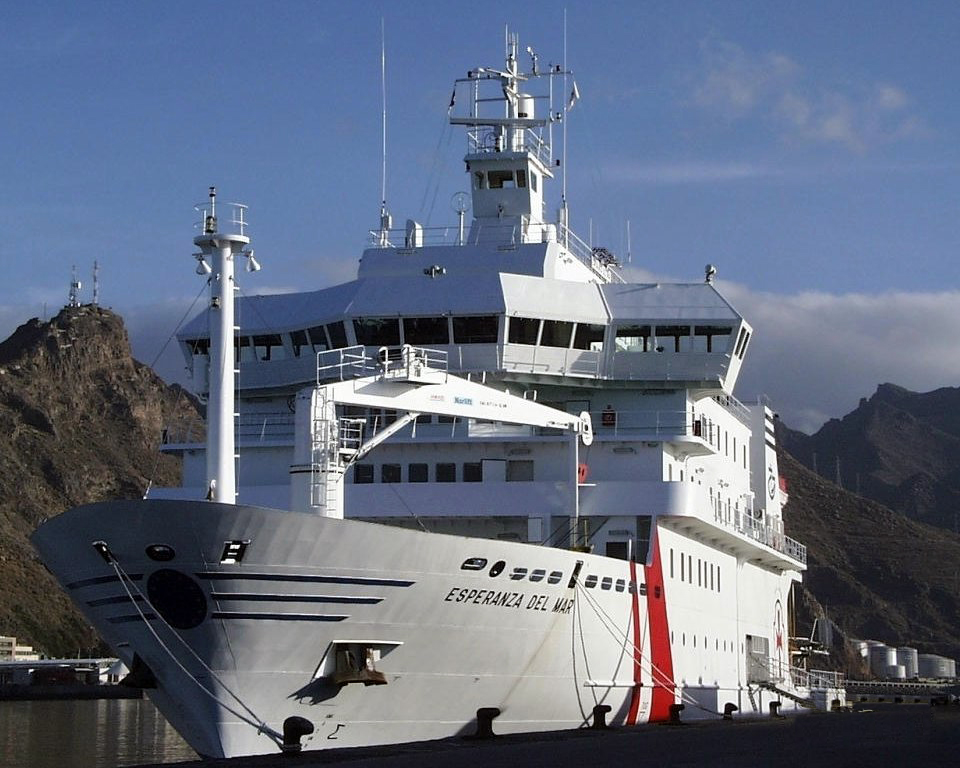
- Esperanza del Mar in Santa Cruz de Tenerife, 2001

History

Spain
- Name: Esperanza del Mar
- Builder: Juliana Constructora Gijonesa S.A., Gijon, Spain
- Commissioned: October 2001
- In service: November 2001
- Identification: IMO number: 9220536; MMSI number: 224731000; Callsign: EBUQ
- Status: in active service

General characteristics
- Displacement: 4,996 GT
- Length: 97.34 m (319.4 ft)
- Beam: 17.70 m (58.1 ft)
- Draught: 5.50 m (18.0 ft)
- Propulsion: 2 × MAK 9M25 2,700 kW 2 x REINTJES WAF 4545 2 x Vulkan RATO R+ G2F2M
- Speed: 17 knots (31 km/h; 20 mph)
- Range: 7,000 miles (6,100 nmi; 11,000 km)

There have been at least three Ships bearing the name Esperanza del Mar (Spanish for 'Hope of the Sea'; Spanish pronunciation: [espeˈɾanθa ðel maɾ]), operated by the Instituto Social de la Marina (Social Institute of the Navy) on behalf of the Spanish Ministry of Employment and Social Security serving as hospital ships for Spanish fishermen.

- Esperanza del Mar – former USS Monadnock, sunk as an artificial reef in 2000.
- Esperanza del Mar – former container freighter, build in 1977, converted to Hospital Ship in 1982.
- Esperanza del Mar – purpose-build vessel, commissioned in 2001.

== 2001 Vessel ==
Costing over €21 million, with around 20 percent being funded by subsidies from the European Union, the ship was built by Juliana Constructora Gijonesa S.A., in Gijon, Spain. Commissioned in October, it entered regular service in late November 2001. Homeported in Las Palmas, Esperanza del Mar provides medical services for the crews of the Spanish industrial fishing fleet off the coast of Western Africa. It is one of the larger hospital ships currently in service.
