= USS Miantonomah (CMc-5) =

US cargo ship and minelayer, 1938 to 1944

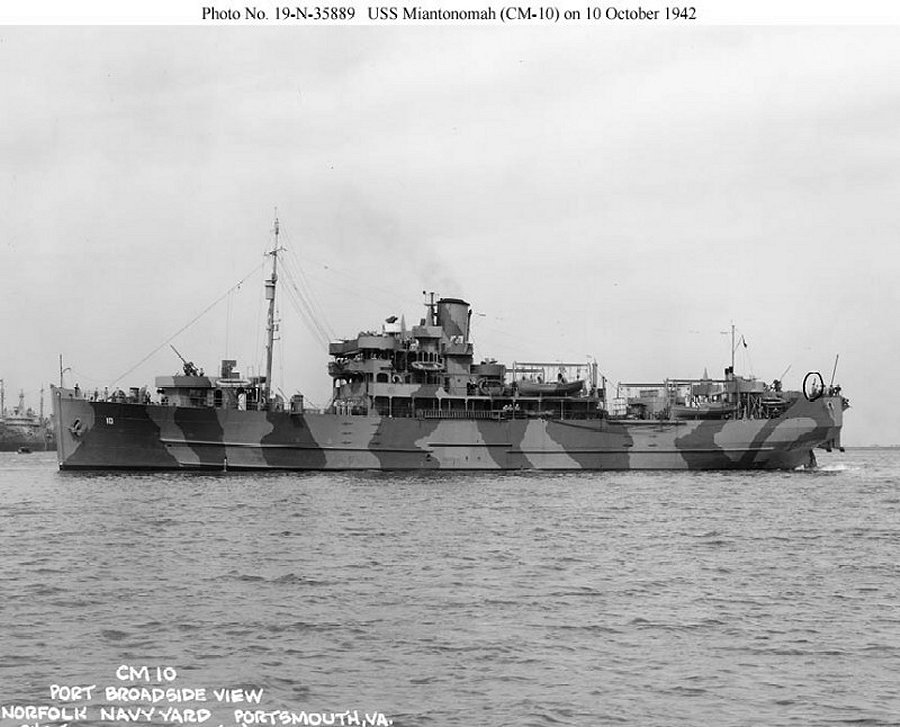
- Near the Norfolk Navy Yard on 10 October 1942 after a refit that produced only minor changers to her appearance

History

United States
- Name: Quaker (1938—1941); Miantonomah (1941-1944)
- Builder: Pusey & Jones Corp., Wilmington, Delaware
- Laid down: 26 May 1937
- Launched: 15 February 1938
- Acquired: Delivery by builder: 15 June 1938; Acquired by Navy: 14 May 1941
- Commissioned: 13 November 1941
- Renamed: Miantonomah, 14 May 1941
- Reclassified: CM-10, 15 May 1942
- Identification: U.S. Official Number: 237351; Signal: WNKO
- Honors and awards: 2 Battle Stars
- Fate: Sunk, 25 September 1944

General characteristics
- Type: Cargo ship / Auxiliary minelayer
- Tonnage: 3,056 GRT, 1,900 DWT, 1,893 Net
- Displacement: As built: 4,090; Navy: 2,870 long tons (2,916 t)
- Length: 292 ft (89 m) (overall); 280.2 ft (85.4 m) (registry)
- Beam: 48 ft 6 in (14.78 m)
- Draft: As built: 18 ft 6 in (5.64 m); 16 ft 6 in (5.03 m)
- Propulsion: 2 x boilers, 1 GE cross compound turbine, 4,000 hp, single shaft
- Speed: As built: 17.5 knots (32.4 km/h; 20.1 mph); Navy: 14 kn (16 mph; 26 km/h)
- Capacity: Cargo, as built: 190,500 cubic feet (5,394.4 m^{3})
- Complement: 202
- Armament: 2 × 4 in (100 mm) guns, 4 × machine guns, 1 × depth charge track

USS Miantonomah (CM-10/CMc-5) was built as SS Quaker by Pusey & Jones Corporation, Wilmington, Delaware in 1938 as a commercial coastwise ship operating as a fast inland water passenger and freight carrier. Quaker was acquired by the Navy in May 1941 for conversion to a coastal minelayer. Miantonomah operated off the east coast of the United States, Africa and the Mediterranean and took part in the invasion of Europe in 1944. The ship was sunk by a mine 25 September 1944.

== Construction ==
Quaker was the first of two identical ships built at the Pusey & Jones yard for the Philadelphia and Norfolk Steamship Company, the second being Cavalier. The design for the two ships was by Theodore E. Ferris and was unusual in that the design called for a speed of 17 kn (20 mph; 31 km/h). (Note: Ferris was responsible for the World War I "Ferris design" ships of the Emergency Fleet Corporation.)

Quaker was laid down 26 May 1937, launched 15 February 1938 and delivered to the Philadelphia & Norfolk Steamship Company by the builder on 15 June 1938.

The ship was registered with U.S. Official Number 237351, signal WNKO as 3,056 GRT, 1,893 Net tons, 280.2 ft (85.4 m) registry lentth, 48.7 ft (14.8 m) beam and 13.5 ft (4.1 m) depth and a home port of Wilmington, Delaware. As built cargo capacity was 190,500 cubic feet (5,394.4 m^{3}). Quaker was propelled by a G.E. 4,000 horsepower cross compound turbine fed by two Babcock & Wilcox boilers driving a single shaft.

== Acquisition by the U.S. Navy ==
Quaker was acquired by the United States Navy from her owner, Philadelphia & Norfolk Steamship Co., at Boston, Massachusetts on 5 May 1941; renamed Miantonomah on 14 May 1941; converted for U.S. Navy use as a coastal minelayer by Bethlehem Shipbuilding Co., East Boston, Massachusetts; and commissioned at Boston on 13 November 1941.

== East Coast operations ==
After completing conversion and following shakedown, Miantonomah steamed to the Virginia Capes where on 11 January 1942 she began laying her first minefield with Monadnock. Operating out of Yorktown, Virginia, she joined in the effort to reduce the German submarine menace along the east coast, and during the next several months sowed mines off Cape Hatteras and Key West, Florida. In addition, defensive mining operations sent her to the southern reaches of the Caribbean off Trinidad. Reclassified CM-10 on 15 May 1942, she continued duty with Mine Division 50 and in October completed preparations for oversea combat duty.

== Invasion of North Africa ==
Loaded with a full cargo of mines, Miantonomah departed Yorktown on 23 October and the next day joined the Center Attack Group (TG 34.9) of the Western Naval Task Force. Heavy seas forced the minelayer out of the convoy south of the Azores on 4 November; escorted by Raven, she rejoined the task force on 7 November as ships approached to launch a three-pronged invasion of French Morocco.

Miantonomah arrived off Fedala late on the 7th and — because of her cargo — remained clear of the transport area. Following the pre-dawn amphibious landings, and the subsequent neutralization of shore batteries by intense accurate naval gunfire, she laid down a defensive minefield north and east of the transport area about noon on 8 November, thence anchored in Fedala Harbor. She remained at Fedala during the next few days and escaped damage from two German submarine attacks on 11–12 November, although three torpedoes on the 11th passed within 25–75 yd (23–69 m) of her. These attacks by U-173 and U-130 sank four U.S. ships and damaged two others.

From 12–15 November, she steamed in convoy to Casablanca. After loading mines from Terror, she joined Monadnock and Terror and on the 16th extended the Fedala minefield along the Moroccan coast to Casablanca. The next morning she departed Casablanca and sailed with other ships of TG 34.9 for the United States. Heavy seas pounded her badly but she arrived at Yorktown on 30 November.

== Return to Stateside ==
Miantonomah underwent repairs at Norfolk from 8 December 1942 – 19 January 1943, then resumed duty out of Yorktown in Chesapeake Bay and along the Virginia coast. She operated out of Boston, Massachusetts from 9 April to 25 May and returned to Yorktown on 29 May to prepare for minelaying operations in the Caribbean.

She departed on 14 June, reached Trinidad on the 20th, and later in the month sowed mines to protect the approaches to that important American base. She returned to the Chesapeake Bay on 28 July and operated out of Yorktown during the next nine months. On 29 April, she sailed to Bayonne, New Jersey; thence, as a unit of TG 27.1, she departed Gravesend Bay, New Jersey on 5 May to support the Allied invasion of Europe.

== Invasion of Europe operations ==
Miantonomah arrived Bristol, England on 16 May and began duty with the 12th Fleet. She operated out of Bristol until D-Day, 6 June, when she steamed via Cardiff to Plymouth, England. She continued dispatch and escort duties in British waters until arriving off Grandcamp, France on 25 June. There she embarked Rear Admiral John E. Wilkes and became flagship for CTF 125. She steamed to Cherbourg on 6 July, and on the 18th Admiral Wilkes hauled down his flag prior to Miantonomah's departure to England.

Arriving Plymouth, later that day, Miantonomah returned to Cherbourg on the 20th carrying supplies for port clearance operations. For more than two months, she made runs between English and liberated French ports and provided valuable support for salvage and clearing operations. On 21 September, she carried port clearance supplies from Cherbourg to Le Havre, which was liberated by sea and land less than two weeks before.

== Sunk by a mine off the French coast ==
Miantonomah sailed from Le Havre early in the afternoon of the 25th. Because of the danger of enemy mines, her skipper — Cdr. Austin E. Rowe — ordered "the highest state of watertight integrity to be set and all personnel not actually on watch below to be on topside and wear lifejackets" — measures which undoubtedly saved many lives. With a French harbor pilot at the conn, she skillfully navigated the inner and outer harbors and cleared the blockships, thence made course for the entrance to the marked channel. As she steamed about 2,000 yd (1,800 m) out from the blockships, she was rocked at 14:15 by a tremendous underwater explosion under the engine room. This blast — possibly followed by a second one — dazed or injured practically the entire crew. Immediately, the stricken ship began to sink rapidly by the stern and to starboard.

Damage control efforts proved useless, and as Coast Guard vessels, British motor launches, and a French fishing craft stood by to rescue survivors, her injured skipper ordered Miantonomah to be abandoned. She sank about 20 minutes after the explosion with a loss of some 58 officers and men. The ship sank at position 49°26′29″N 0°11′31″E.

== Awards ==
Miantonomah received two battle stars for her World War II service.
