= Hague Convention on Hospital Ships =

1904 multilateral treaty

The Hague Convention on Hospital Ships is a 1904 multilateral treaty that supplemented the 1899 Hague Convention for the adaptation to Maritime Warfare of the Principles of the Geneva Convention. The convention established that during times of war, hospital ships would be exempted from dues and taxes imposed on vessels in the ports of the states that ratify the treaty. It is the one treaty on the laws of war that was concluded between the two conferences at The Hague in 1899 and 1907.

== Entry into force and parties ==
The Hague Convention on Hospital Ships was concluded on 21 December 1904 and entered into force on 26 March 1907. It was signed by 26 states and as of 2014 it is in force for 30 states. One state—Serbia—signed the treaty but has not ratified it. The convention remains in force for the states that ratified it.

State	Signature year	Ratification year	Notes
Austria	1904	1907	Signed and ratified as Austria-Hungary.
Belgium	1904	1907	
China	1904	1907	Signed and ratified by the Qing Dynasty government of China.
Cuba	–	1965	
Free City of Danzig	–	1921	The ratification by the Free City of Danzig has no application to a current state.
Denmark	1904	1907	
France	1904	1907	Signed and ratified by the government of the French Third Republic.
Germany	1904	1907	Signed and ratified as the German Empire.
Greece	1904	1907	Signed and ratified as the Kingdom of Greece.
Guatemala		1906	
Hungary	1904	1907	Signed and ratified as Austria-Hungary.
Iran	1904	1908	Signed and ratified as "Persia" by the (Iran) Qajar dynasty government.
Italy	1904	1907	Signed and ratified as the Kingdom of Italy.
Japan	1904	1907	Signed and ratified as the Empire of Japan.
South Korea	1904	1907	Signed and ratified as the Korean Empire.
Luxembourg	1904	1907	
Mexico	1904	1907	
Montenegro	1904	1907	Signed and ratified as the Principality of Montenegro.
Netherlands	1904	1907	
Norway	–	1907	
Peru	1904	1907	
Poland	–	1921	Ratified by the government of the Second Polish Republic.
Portugal	1904	1907	Signed and ratified as the Kingdom of Portugal.
Romania	1904	1907	Signed and ratified as the Kingdom of Romania.
Russia	1904	1907	Signed and ratified as the Russian Empire.
Serbia	1904	–	Signed as the Kingdom of Serbia.
Spain	1904	1907	Signed and ratified by the government of Spain under the Restoration.
Sweden	–	1908	
Switzerland	1904	1907	
Thailand	1904	1907	Ratified as "Siam".
Turkey	–	1932	
United States	1904	1907	
