= USS Monadnock (ACM-10) =

Minesweeper of the United States Navy

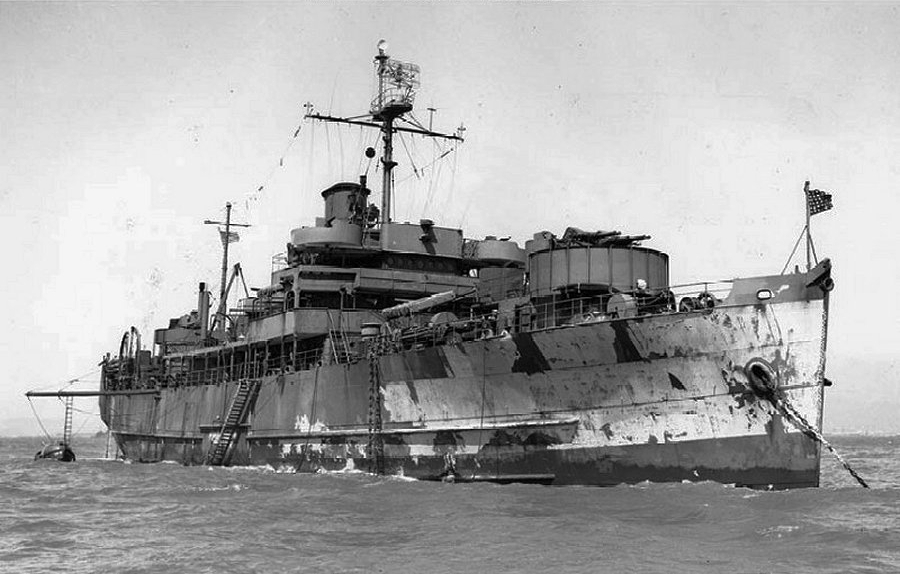

History

United States
- Name: Cavalier (1938-1941); Monadnock (1941-1946); Cavalier (1947-1949); Karukara (1949-1952); Monte de la Esperanza (1952-; Esperanza del Mar
- Namesake: Mount Monadnock & USS Monadnock (1863)
- Owner: Philadelphia and Norfolk Steamship Company (1938-1941); U.S. Navy (1941-1946)
- Builder: Pusey and Jones Corp., Wilmington, Delaware
- Yard number: 437
- Launched: 14 April 1938
- Acquired: Delivery by builder: 5 August 1938; Navy: Purchased 9 June 1941
- Commissioned: 2 December 1941, as USS Monadnock (CMc-4)
- Decommissioned: 3 June 1946
- Reclassified: CM-9, 1 May 1942; ACM-10, 10 July 1945
- Stricken: July 1946
- Identification: U.S. Official Number: 237524; Signal: WNOQ
- Honours and awards: 3 battle stars
- Fate: Sunk off the coast of Spain, 2000

General characteristics
- Tonnage: 3,056 GRT, 1,900 DWT, 1,893 Net
- Displacement: As built: 4,090; Navy: 3,110 long tons (3,160 t)
- Length: 292 ft (89 m) (overall); 280.2 ft (85.4 m) (registry)
- Beam: 48 ft 6 in (14.78 m)
- Draft: As built: 18 ft 6 in (5.64 m); Navy: 13 ft 6 in (4.11 m) (loaded)
- Depth: 13.5 ft (4.1 m) (of hold); 32 ft 3 in (9.8 m) (hurricane deck); 23 ft (7.0 m) (main deck)
- Propulsion: 2 x boilers, 1 GE cross compound turbine, 4,000 hp, single shaft
- Speed: 17.5 knots (32.4 km/h; 20.1 mph)
- Capacity: Cargo, as built: 190,500 cubic feet (5,394.4 m^{3})
- Complement: 201
- Armament: 2 × 3 in (76 mm) guns

USS Monadnock (ACM-10) was a coastal minelayer in the U.S. Navy, the third vessel named after Mount Monadnock, a solitary mountain (monadnock) of more than 3,100 feet in southern New Hampshire close to the border of Massachusetts. The ship was built as the cargo vessel Cavalier for the Philadelphia and Norfolk Steamship Company by Pusey and Jones Corporation, Wilmington, Delaware in 1938. The Navy purchased the ship 9 June 1941 for wartime use. After decommissioning the ship was sold in June 1947 for commercial use then sold to a Panamanian company in 1949 to be renamed Karukara. In 1952 the ship became Monte de la Esperanza for a company in Bilbao, Spain transporting bananas to the United Kingdom from the Canary Islands for more than 20 years. She was later sold to the Marine Institute of Spain for operation as a hospital ship for more than 10 years serving the fishing fleet of the Canary Islands as Esperanza del Mar until becoming an artificial reef off Spain in 2000.

== Construction ==
Cavalier, yard hull 437, contract 1069, was launched 14 April 1938 by Pusey and Jones Corp., Wilmington, Delaware and delivered to the Philadelphia and Norfolk Steamship Company, Philadelphia, Pennsylvania on 5 August 1938. Cavalier was the second of two identical ships built at the yard for the Philadelphia and Norfolk Steamship Company, the first being Quaker. The design for the two ships was by Theodore E. Ferris and were unusual in that the design called for a speed of 17 kn (20 mph; 31 km/h). (Note: Ferris was responsible for the World War I "Ferris design" ships of the Emergency Fleet Corporation.)

Cavalier was registered with U.S. Official Number 237524, signal WNOQ as 3,056 GRT, 1,893 Net tons, 280.2 ft (85.4 m) registry lentth, 48.7 ft (14.8 m) beam and 13.5 ft (4.1 m) depth and a home port of Wilmington, Delaware. As built cargo capacity was 190,500 cubic feet (5,394.4 m^{3}). The ship was propelled by a G.E. 4,000 horsepower cross compound turbine fed by two Babcock & Wilcox boilers driving a single shaft.

== Service history ==
Cavalier was purchased by the U.S. Navy on 9 June 1941 from the Philadelphia and Norfolk Steamship Company for $1,250,000. The ship was converted at the Bethlehem Steel Co., Atlantic Works, East Boston, Massachusetts; and commissioned as the Coastal Minelayer Monadnock (CMc-4), 2 December 1941.

=== Invasion of Europe operations ===
Following shakedown in the Chesapeake Bay area, Monadnock operated in the 5th Naval District until 25 March, when she sailed for the British West Indies. While in the Caribbean, 1 May 1942, she was redesignated Minelayer CM-9. Returning to Virginia, 20 May, she resumed operations in the 5th Naval District. In late October she joined a convoy bound for North Africa. Arriving off Casablanca on 8 November, she remained in the assault area through the 11th, when she got underway for her return voyage across the Atlantic, arriving at Yorktown, Virginia, on the 30th.

=== Reassigned to Pacific Fleet operations ===
In the spring of 1943, Monadnock operated off the southern New England coast, first for the Minecraft Training Command and then under ComServFor, Atlantic Fleet, before resuming maneuvers in Chesapeake Bay. Reassigned to the Pacific Fleet in late fall, the minelayer departed Norfolk, Virginia, with TG 29.18, transited the Panama Canal and arrived at San Diego 28 December. Routed on to Pearl Harbor, she reported to Commander, Minecraft, Pacific Fleet, 7 January 1944, and by the 13th was underway for the South Pacific.

Arriving at Nouméa on the 29th, she joined ServRon 6 and until 15 April carried out exercises and duty assignments in the New Hebrides. From the end of April until July, she worked in the Solomons and then moved on to New Guinea, where she was briefly employed off Finschhafen. Operating again in the New Hebrides, based at Espiritu Santo, by October, she sailed, with passengers, to Brisbane, and upon her return replenished her stores and departed, 13 November, for Manus, Admiralty Islands, to join the 7th Fleet.

=== Supporting the Leyte Landings ===
Monadnock conducted training exercises at Manus until 23 December, when she departed for Leyte. Arriving on the 30th, she soon sailed for Mangarin Bay, on the southwest coast of Mindoro, where she remained from 3 January to 6 February 1945. She then shifted, with TU 78.3.19, to Subic Bay, Luzon, returning at the end of the month to Leyte. Thence, she steamed to Ulithi to stage for the forthcoming Okinawa campaign.

On 5 April, she departed in convoy for Nansei Shoto, as a unit of TF 52. Operating as a unit of TG 52.2, she conducted minelaying operations at Kerama Retto and off the Hagushi anchorage during May. Then, in convoy with TU 51.29.18, she departed for the United States, arriving at San Francisco, 24 June, for overhaul and conversion to Auxiliary Mine Layer ACM-10 (effective 10 July 1945).

=== Occupation duties ===
Conversion completed, she departed for Japan 6 September, transporting troops to Eniwetok, Guam, and Okinawa while en route. Arriving at Sasebo, 22 October, for occupation duty, she remained until 9 March 1946, when, with military passengers again embarked, she sailed for San Francisco. Arriving 7 April, she decommissioned 3 June, was struck from the Navy List 3 July 1946, and transferred to the Maritime Commission for disposal 20 August 1946 by a Navy declaration of surplus. (Note: DANFS date of 20 June 1947 transfer to MC is incorrect. MARAD data shows the ship was transferred in 1946 with a declaration of surplus message dated 20 August and the ship sold on 17 June 1947. A note dated 22 August 1946 shows the ship was transferred from Naval anchorage to the Suisun Bay Reserve Fleet.)

Monadnock earned three battle stars for her service in World War II.

== Later career ==
The ship remained in the reserve fleet until sold for $104,000 17 June 1947 to James J. Wilkinson for operation with signal WNOQ and home port of Norfolk, Virginia.

Monadnock was sold to a Panamanian company in 1949, and renamed Karukara. Sold again in 1952 and renamed Monte de la Esperanza she operated for more than 20 years transporting bananas from the Canary Islands to the United Kingdom. Sold to the Instituto Social de la Marina (Social Institute of the Navy), Spain and renamed Esperanza del Mar, she was equipped as a hospital ship and operated out of the Canary Islands assisting fishing boats for more than 10 years. (Note: Two later ships of the same name served this function.) Esperanza del Mar was deliberately sunk as an Artificial reef in 2000 off the coast of Spain.
