= List of hospital ships of the Brazilian Navy =

The Brazilian Navy has three hospital ships, officially called Infirmary Assistance Ship (Navio de Assistência Hospitalar, in Portuguese), which are designed specifically to provide medical assistance on rivers having shallow waters.

The two ships of the Oswaldo Cruz class have a helipad, two sickbays, an operating theater, a dental surgery, a laboratory, two clinics, and X-ray facilities. Doutor Montenegro lacks the helipad and is smaller and slower.

- U-16 Doutor Montenegro
- U-18 Oswaldo Cruz
- U-19 Carlos Chagas

The main characteristics of the Oswaldo Cruz class are:

- Length: 47.2 meters
- Beam: 8.5 meters
- Draught: 1.8 meters
- Full load displacement: 490 tons
- Speed: 17 knots
- Range: 4,000 miles at 12 knots
- Personnel: 4 officers, 5 doctors and a dentist, 15 technical health personnel, and 21 enlisted men.

== See also ==
- Ships of the Brazilian Navy

== Bibliography ==
- Saunders, Stephen, ed. (2004). Jane's Fighting Ships 2004–2005. Coulsdon, UK: Jane's Information Group. ISBN 0-7106-2623-1.
