= Type 920 hospital ship =

Ship class in China

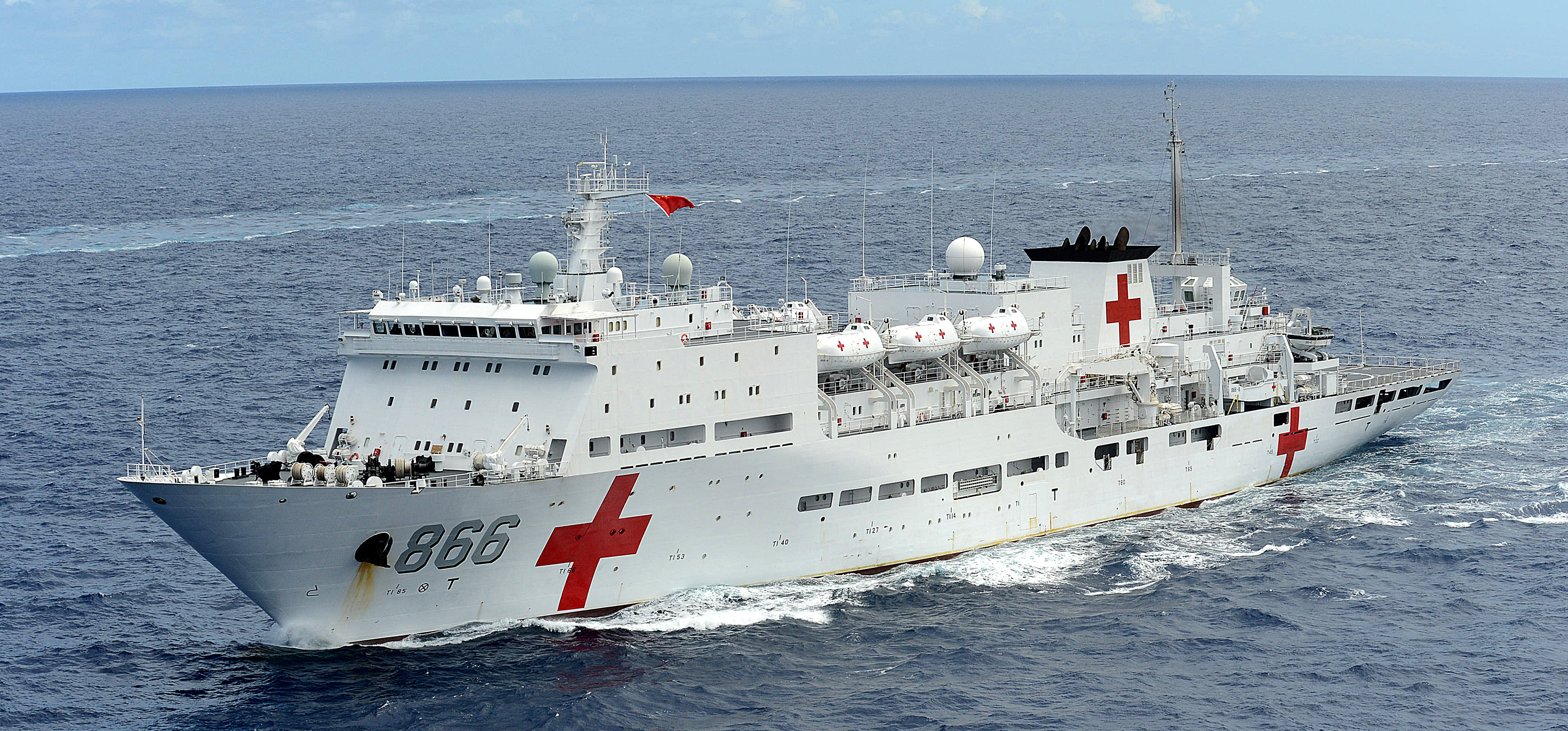
- Lead ship of the class, Daishan Dao (Peace Ark)

Class overview
- Builders: Guangzhou Shipyard International
- Operators: People's Liberation Army Navy
- In service: 2008–present
- Building: 0
- Completed: 3
- Active: 3

General characteristics
- Type: Hospital ship
- Displacement: 25,760 tons (full)
- Length: 590.5 ft (180.0 m) (full)
- Speed: 19 kn (35 km/h; 22 mph)
- Range: 10,000 nmi (19,000 km; 12,000 mi)
- Complement: Basic: 130; Full: 440
- Aviation facilities: Hangar; Helicopter pad

The Type 920 hospital ship (NATO reporting name: Anwei) is a class of hospital ship operated by the People's Liberation Army Navy of China.

== History ==
Daishan Dao (or Peace Ark), the lead ship, commissioned in 2008, was the "center of China's maritime global health engagements" and an " enduring feature of China’s naval diplomacy" from 2010.

Silk Road Ark performed its first medical mission in 2024.

== Characteristics ==
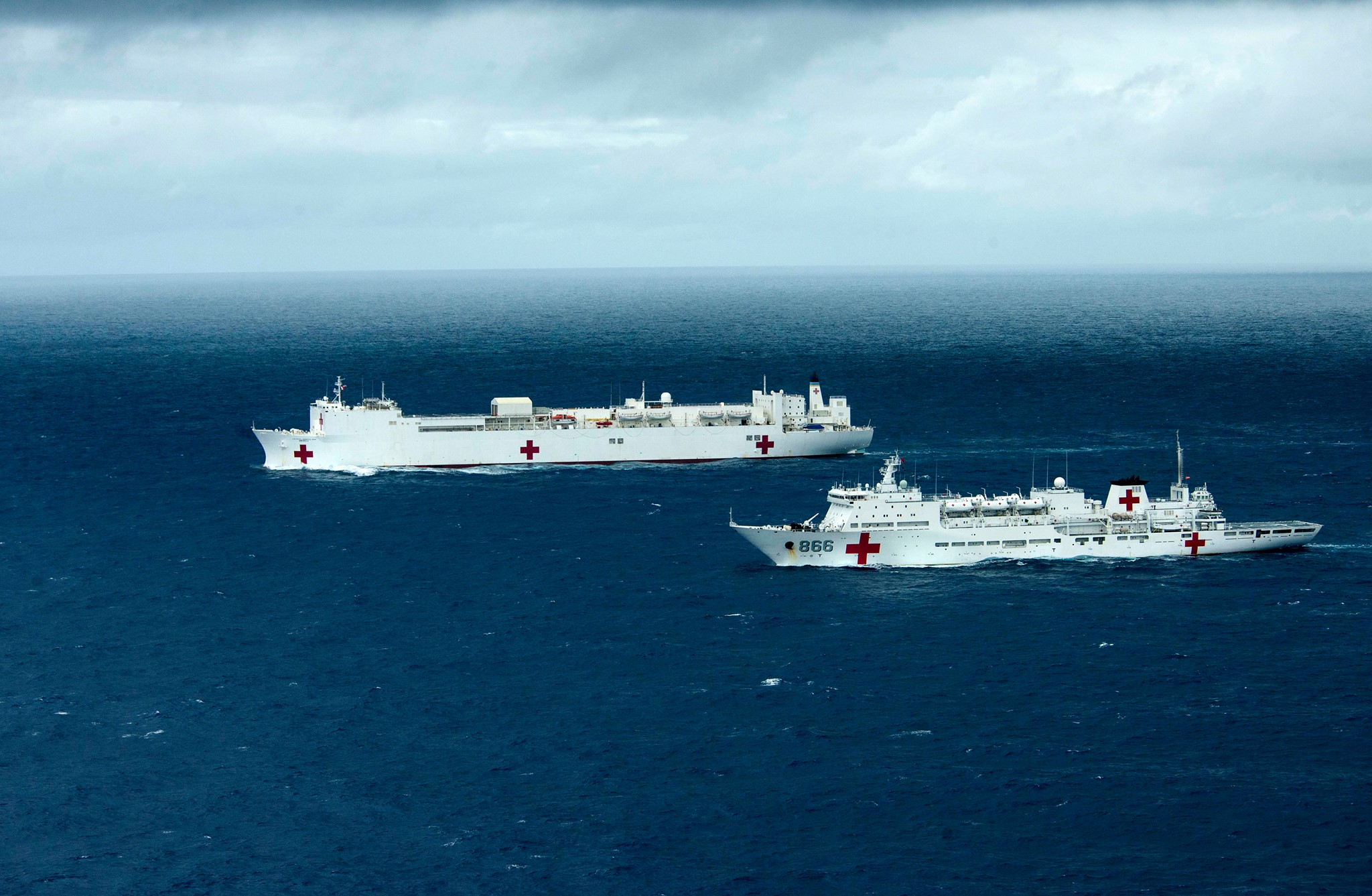
USNS Mercy (front) of the United States Navy and Peace Ark of the Chinese People's Liberation Army Navy sail side by side.

Up to 2024, Daishan Dao was reported to have 300 beds, 20 ICU beds, 8 operating theatres, and can perform 40 major surgeries a day, in addition to X-ray, ultrasound, computerized tomography, hypothermia, hemodialysis, traditional Chinese medicine, and dental facilities. She was also equipped with a remote networking and communications system to allow teleconferencing with doctors and specialists on land.

As a hospital ship, Daishan Dao is unarmed except for small arms for self defense.

== Ships of the class ==
Name	Hull No.	Builder	Laid down	Launched	Commissioned	Fleet	Status
Daishan Dao (Peace Ark) (和平方舟)	866	Guangzhou Shipyard International			December 2008	East Sea Fleet	Active
Silk Road Ark (丝路方舟)	867	Guangzhou Shipyard International			2023	South Sea Fleet	Active
Auspicious Ark (吉祥方舟)	868	Guangzhou Shipyard International		2024	since May 2025	North Sea Fleet	Active

== Gallery ==
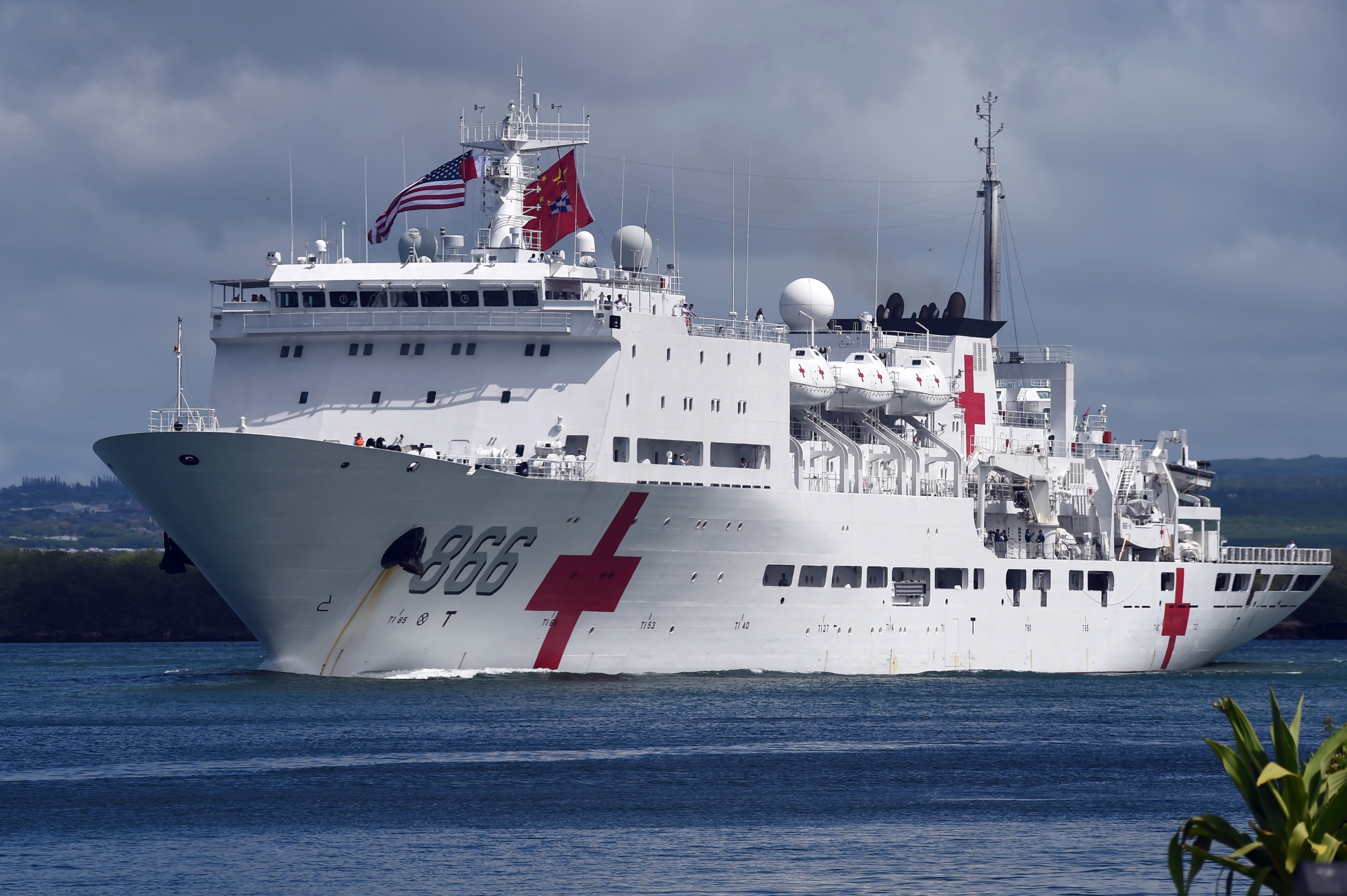
Peace Ark during Rim of the Pacific 2016.

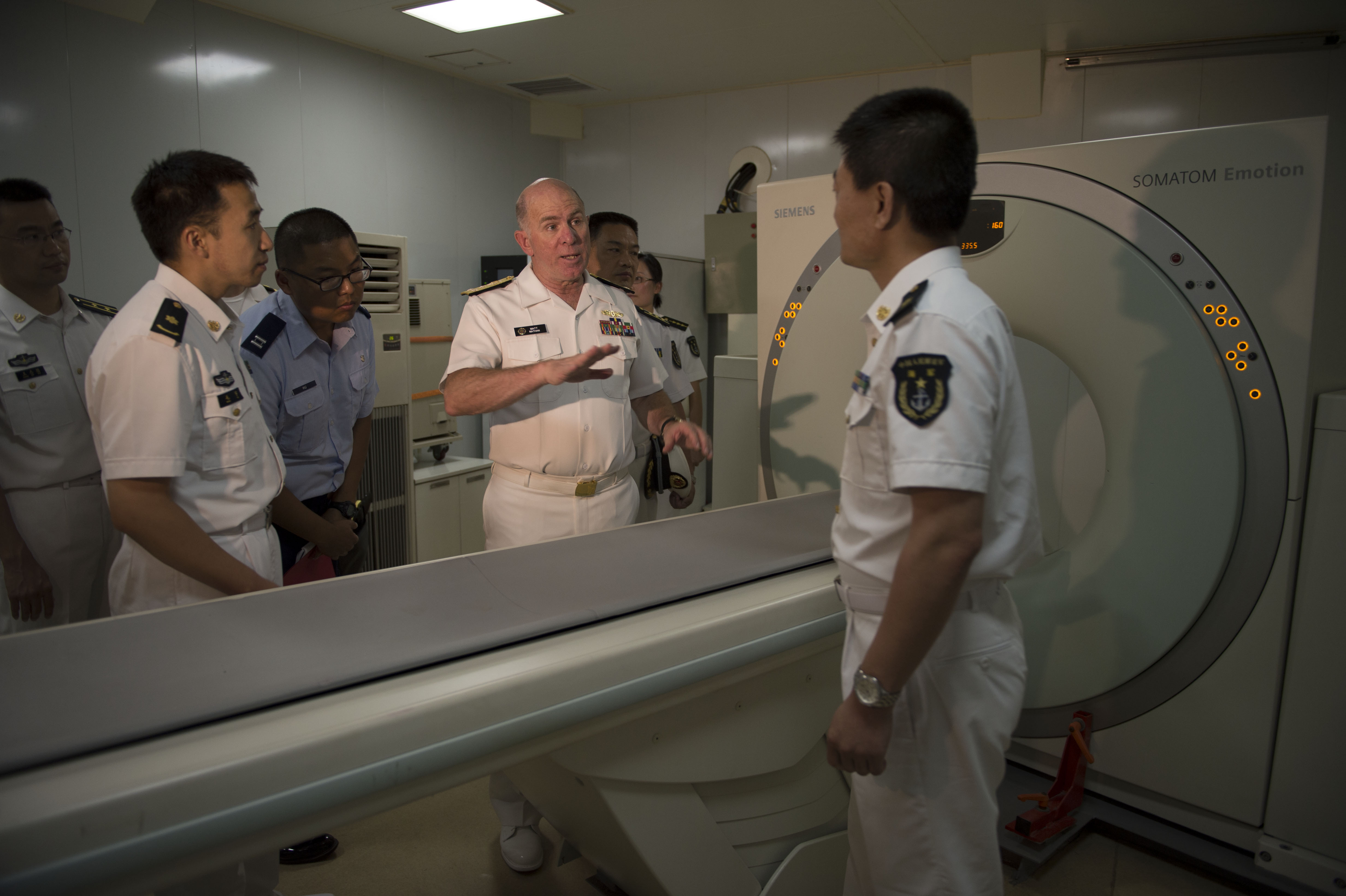
The computerized tomography (CT) scan aboard the Peace Ark

== Sources ==
- Robinson, Jonathan (10 February 2025). "The PLA Navy's Hospital Ship Fleet: Concerns, Developments, and Future Prospects". China Maritime Report (45). China Maritime Studies Institute.
