= Chinese medical evacuation ship Zhuanghe =

Chinese military ship

History

China
- Name: Zhuanghe
- Builder: Seebeckwerft, Germany
- Launched: July 1985
- Commissioned: 2004
- Status: in active service, as of 2014

General characteristics
- Tonnage: 24,043 GT; 9,868 NT; 30,940 DWT
- Length: 200.48 m (657 ft 9 in)
- Beam: 28.40 m (93 ft 2 in)
- Height: 51.59 m (169 ft 3 in)
- Draught: 10.73 m (35 ft 2 in)
- Depth: 15.6 m (51 ft 2 in)
- Propulsion: 1 × 8,529 kW (11,438 hp) MAN SE B&W 6L-70MCE diesel engine, 1 shaft
- Speed: 16.7 knots (30.9 km/h; 19.2 mph)
- Range: 18,000 nmi (33,000 km; 21,000 mi)
- Complement: 32

Zhuanghe (865) (Chinese: 庄河) is a converted container ship that entered service with People's Liberation Army Navy (PLAN) South Sea Fleet in 2004. The modular container ship is intended for various missions with the primary task of medical evacuation, but with different modules, it can also perform other missions such as troop transport, naval and aviation training.

Originally, Zhuanghe was the third ship of the Xianghe (香河) class container ships built by West Germany in the mid-1980s for COSCO, with some minor differences between each ship of this class, such as number of containers carried and propulsion system. A total of four ships were built by three different German shipyards and Zhuanghe itself was built by Seebeckwerft in 1985 and entered service in July of the same year. Standard capacity was a total of 1668 containers, including 108 for refrigerated containers. Approximately half of the containers were carried above the deck, and the other half below deck in cargo holds. The ship was divided into six cargo holds with a volume of approximately 39,905 cubic meters. A total of 118 bottles of carbon dioxide dry powder fire extinguishers were carried to fight potential fire, which would be detected by automatic fire detection system. As a container ship, Zhuanghe was crewed by a total of 32 sailors. Standard rescue equipment included two lifeboats each with capacity of 41 people, a liferaft on the port side with capacity of 25 people and two life rafts on starboard side each with capacity of 31 people.

The conversion of Zhuanghe was completed in 2004 and the number of lifeboats and life rafts were increased, while the number of containers were drastically reduced because containers are not stacked above deck any more. A total of a hundred container sized modules are carried, and any combination can be selected based on the mission requirement. Built as a cargo ship, not much consideration was given to passenger comfort because Zhuanghe was not a cruise ship, and only carried a very small crew due to high levels of automation. Due to the lack of information released about the ship, it is not clear if Zhuanghe is stable enough to allow extremely complex surgeries to be performed in extremely adverse weather like the Type 920 hospital ship, a capability the earlier Qiaongsha class ambulance transport, also converted from a cargo ship does not have.
