= Deng Shichang =

Chinese navy officer

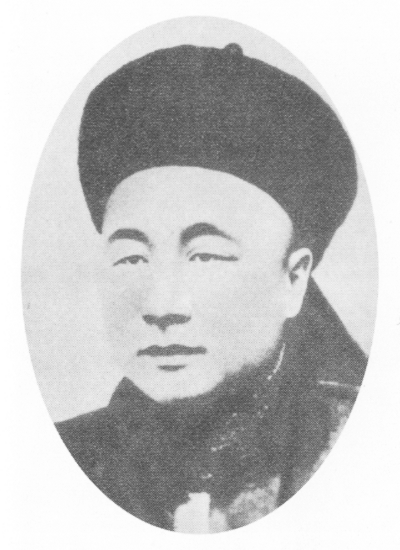
- Deng Shichang
- Born: 4 October 1849; Panyu County, Guangzhou Prefecture, Guangdong, Qing China (present-day Haizhu District, Guangzhou, Guangdong, China)
- Died: 17 September 1894 (aged 44); Korea Bay, Yellow Sea
- Military career
- Allegiance: Qing Dynasty
- Branch: Imperial Chinese Navy: Beiyang Fleet (1880–1894); Fujian Fleet (1874–1880)
- Service years: 1874–1894
- Rank: Guandai (equivalent to Captain)
- Unit: Zhiyuan
- Conflicts: Battle of the Yalu River (1894) †
- Awards: Posthumously awarded the position of taizi shaobao (Tutor to the Crown Prince)

Deng Shichang
- Traditional Chinese: 鄧世昌
- Simplified Chinese: 邓世昌
Transcriptions
Standard Mandarin
- Hanyu Pinyin: Dèng Shìchāng
- Wade–Giles: Teng Shih-Ch'ang
Yue: Cantonese
- Jyutping: Dang6 Sai3-coeng1

Zhengqing (courtesy name)
- Chinese: 正卿
Transcriptions
Standard Mandarin
- Hanyu Pinyin: Zhèngqīng
- Wade–Giles: Cheng-ching

Zhuangjie (posthumous name)
- Traditional Chinese: 壯節
- Simplified Chinese: 壮节
Transcriptions
Standard Mandarin
- Hanyu Pinyin: Zhuàngjié
- Wade–Giles: Chuang-chieh

Deng Shichang (4 October 1849 – 17 September 1894), courtesy name Zhengqing, posthumous name Zhuangjie, was an Imperial Chinese Navy officer who lived in the late Qing dynasty. He is best known for his service in the Beiyang Fleet during the First Sino-Japanese War as the captain of the protected cruiser Zhiyuan. He participated in the Battle of the Yalu River on 17 September 1894 against the Imperial Japanese Navy. After Zhiyuan was sunk in battle, he refused to be rescued and eventually went down with his ship. He was posthumously awarded the position of taizi shaobao (Tutor to the Crown Prince) by the Qing government and honoured as a hero in the Shrine of Loyalty in Beijing.

== Early life ==
Deng was born in Longdaowei, Panyu, Guangdong, which is in present-day Haizhu District, Guangzhou City, Guangdong Province. His given name was originally "Yongchang" (永昌) but was later changed to "Shichang". He was born in a relatively wealthy family that ran a tea trading business. When he was a child, his father sent him to attend a missionary school in Shanghai, where he received a Western education.

== Service in the Fujian Fleet ==
In 1867, Deng was accepted into the Naval Academy (船政學堂) in Mawei, Fujian, as part of the first batch of students. After completing seven years of education – five years of theoretical learning, and two years of practical training on board the Jianwei (建威) – he graduated from the Naval Academy in 1874 with excellent results, and impressed Shen Baozhen, the Naval Minister in the Qing government. Upon Deng's graduation, Shen assigned Deng to the Fujian Fleet and appointed him as the bangdai (幫帶; equivalent to Commander) of the scout transport boat Chenhang (琛航). In the following year, Deng was promoted to serve as the guandai (管帶; equivalent to Captain) of the gunboat Haidongyun (海東雲). In May 1874, when the Japanese invaded Taiwan, Deng was ordered to lead Qing forces to reinforce the defences at Keelung and the Pescadores. He was also appointed as qianzong (千總; seven ranks below tidu).

== Service in the Beiyang Fleet ==
In 1880, Deng was transferred to the Beiyang Fleet and sent to Britain to receive and escort the cruiser Yangwei back to China. Upon his return, he was appointed as the guandai (Captain) of the Yangwei. In 1887, he was sent to Britain again to receive the protected cruiser Zhiyuan, and was subsequently appointed as its guandai. He was also promoted to the position of a fujiang (副將; two ranks below tidu) in the central administration of the Beiyang Fleet. At the time, Deng was the only guandai in the Beiyang Fleet who was not educated or trained outside of China. In 1891, when Li Hongzhang, the Viceroy of the Capital Province, inspected the Beiyang Fleet, he was so impressed with how Deng trained his sailors that he awarded Deng the honorary title of a baturu.

=== Battle of the Yalu River ===
The Battle of the Yalu River broke out on 17 September 1894, as a naval battle of the First Sino-Japanese War of 1894–1895, which was fought between the Qing Empire of China and the Empire of Japan. Early in the battle, Deng moved aggressively against the Japanese command vessel Sei-Kyo Maru, inflicting considerable damage on it, and coming under counterattack by the Japanese flying squadron led by Admiral Tsuboi Kōzō (Yoshino, Takachiho, Akitsushima, and Naniwa). The Japanese cruisers circled the Zhiyuan, firing at a more rapid pace and scoring more hits than the poorly trained Chinese gunners with their obsolete cannons. Deng ordered the Zhiyuan to close on the Naniwa and attempt to ram it, but was hit in the bow by a shell fired from either the Naniwa or Takachiho at 1550 hours, which caused a massive explosion, after which the Zhiyuan rapidly sank. Some 245 officers and crewmen went down with the cruiser. Deng refused to be rescued and eventually drowned at sea with his pet dog.

== Posthumous honours ==
At a meeting after the battle, the top brass of the Beiyang Fleet expressed strong disapproval of Deng's decision to die in battle, stating that although Deng's action was heroic, it nonetheless resulted in the loss of not only the cruiser but also its captain. They were worried that other captains might try to emulate Deng and be only too willing to give up their lives easily, hence they produced a legal instrument, the Naval Constitution on Punishing Evil and Encouraging Goodness (海軍懲勸章程), to pardon the sailors who lost their ships in battle. Li Hongzhang also shared the same view as the Beiyang Fleet's top brass – that Deng's decision to reject rescue and drown was not praiseworthy – and ordered other military leaders to not follow Deng as an example.

In spite of such negative views, Deng's death stirred up strong nationalist sentiments throughout China. The Guangxu Emperor, while wiping away tears, wrote about Deng, "On this day, the people shed tears but your act of courage has raised the navy's morale." The Qing government also awarded Deng the posthumous name "Zhuangjie" (literally "courageous and chaste") and posthumous appointment of taizi shaobao (太子少保; Tutor to the Crown Prince), and honoured him as a hero in the Shrine of Loyalty (昭忠祠) in Beijing. Deng's mother was presented with a 1.5 kilogramme plaque made of gold and inscribed with the words "Excellent Upbringing of a Child", while Deng's family were given 100,000 taels of silver as pension. Deng's family used the money to build a Deng Family Shrine in Deng's hometown. The shrine was not damaged by the Japanese during the Second Sino-Japanese War because of the respect and admiration they had for Deng.

== Family ==
Deng had three sons and two daughters. His eldest son, Deng Haohong (鄧浩鴻), died in 1947. His second son, Deng Haoyang (鄧浩洋), died at a relatively young age. His third son, Deng Haoqian (鄧浩乾), who was born after his death, served in the Republic of China Navy and died in 1969 in Wuxi.

== PLA Navy training ship ==
In 1996, the People's Liberation Army Navy named its Type 0891A training ship Shichang after Deng to commemorate him.

== Portrayals in the media ==
Actors who have portrayed Deng on screen include:

- Li Moran, in the 1962 Chinese film Jia Wu Feng Yun (甲午風雲)
- Chen Baoguo, in the 1992 Chinese television series The Beiyang Fleet
- Lu Yi, in the 2012 Chinese film The Sino-Japanese War at Sea 1894
