= Chinese training ship Shichang =

PLA Navy training ship

History

People's Republic of China
- Name: Shichang
- Namesake: Deng Shichang
- Builder: Qiuxin Shipyard
- Launched: April 1996
- Commissioned: 27 January 1997
- Identification: Hull number: 82
- Status: Active

General characteristics
- Class & type: Training ship
- Displacement: 10,160 tonnes (full load)
- Length: 120 metres (390 ft)
- Beam: 18 metres (59 ft)
- Draught: 7 metres (23 ft)
- Propulsion: 2 x diesel engines; 2 shafts
- Speed: 17.5 knots (32.4 km/h; 20.1 mph)
- Range: 8,000 nautical miles (15,000 km; 9,200 mi) at 17 knots (31 km/h; 20 mph)
- Capacity: 300 containers
- Complement: 170 crew; and; 200 trainees
- Aircraft carried: 2 x Harbin Z-9A
- Aviation facilities: Flight deck

Shichang is a training ship in the People's Republic of China's People's Liberation Army Navy (PLAN). The ship is formally designated as a "defence mobilization vessel" and may be used for helicopter or navigation training, as a container ship, or as a hospital ship. It is the PLAN's first aviation training ship. The NATO reporting name for the type is Daishi-class AXT.

== Design ==
The original plan was to convert Shichang from the civilian roll-on/roll-off ship Huayuankou; a new ship was built instead.

Shichang has a bridge structure forward with the flight deck occupying most of the remaining area behind it; the funnel is toward the stern on the starboard side. The flight deck has two landing spots and may be reconfigured; options include a modular hangar and control space behind the forward structure, or 300 standard 20-foot containers.

== See also ==
- RFA Argus (A135), a Royal Navy auxiliary with a similar configuration

== Sources ==
- Saunders, Stephan, ed. (2015). Jane's Fighting Ships 2015-2016. Jane's Information Group. ISBN 978-0710631435.
- Wertheim, Eric (2013). The Naval Institute Guide to Combat Fleets of the World: Their Ships, Aircraft, and Systems (16 ed.). Annapolis, Maryland: Naval Institute Press. ISBN 978-1591149545.
