= Canal boat =

Canal Boat may refer to:

- Barge, a flat-bottomed craft for carrying cargo
- Narrowboat, a specialized craft for operation on the narrow canals of England, Scotland and Wales
- Widebeam, a canal boat with a beam of 2.16 metres (7 ft 1 in) or greater and built in the style of a narrowboat

== See also ==
- Canal craft, a list of the types of canal craft in the United Kingdom
