= Hospital barge =

Barge used to treat and transport wounded soldiers

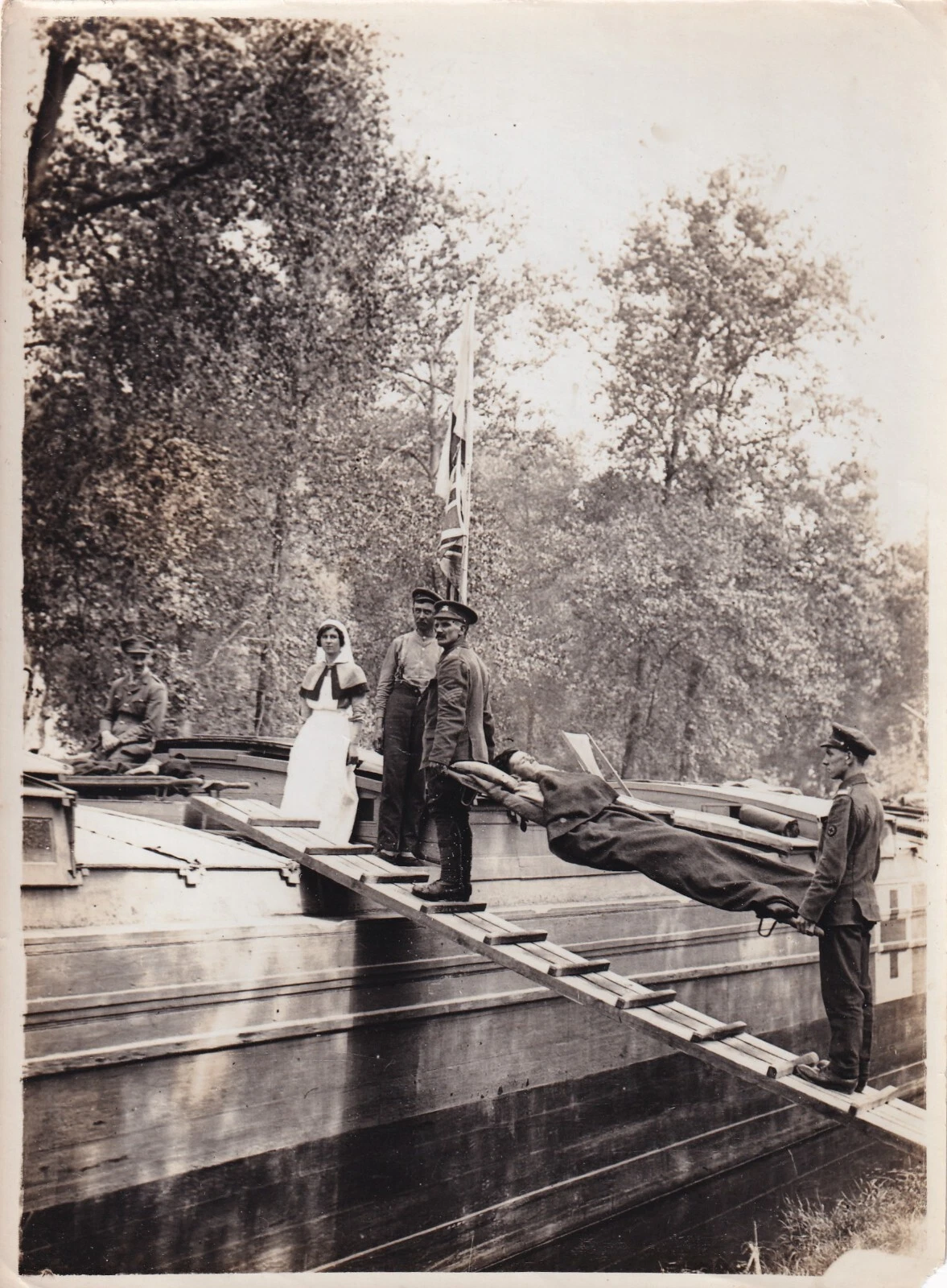
British Royal Army Medical Corps troops carrying men wounded during the Battle of the Somme aboard a hospital barge on the Somme Canal, Vaux-sur-Somme, France, 25 August 1916

A hospital barge, also referred to as an ambulance barge, was a specially-fitted barge used to treat and transport sick and wounded soldiers, most utilised during the First World War.

== Use ==
=== First World War ===
During the First World War, hospital barges were used to transport casualties from the rear of the frontlines in northern France and Belgium to ports on the northern coast of France. From here the wounded would be shipped back to England aboard hospital ships for further treatment and recovery. Hospital barges utilised a pre-existing network of canals across northern France and Belgium. Although slower, they were a notably smoother mode of medical evacuation, and were therefore particularly useful for those with severe injuries that could be aggravated by intense sudden movements caused by ambulances driving over rough roads or hospital trains running on uneven railroads. They were used particularly by the British Army from 1914 to 1918.
