= Widebeam =

Canal boat in the style of a British narrowboat with a wider beam

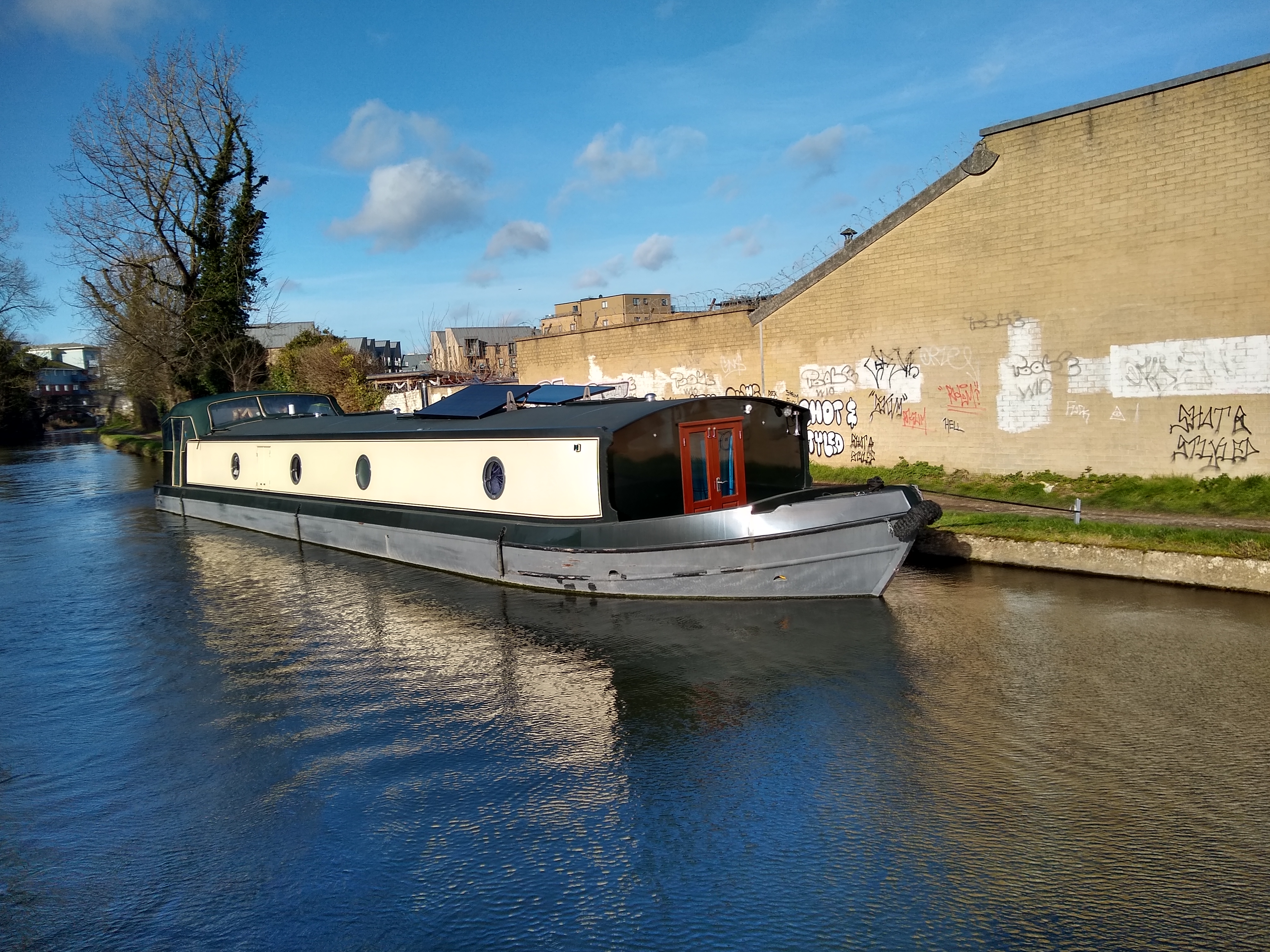
Widebeam on the Grand Union Canal moored at West Drayton

A widebeam is a canal boat built in the style of a British narrowboat but with a beam of 2.16 metres (7 ft 1 in) or greater.

== The nature of a widebeam ==
The Canal and River Trust (CRT) gives no precise definition of a "widebeam", merely distinguishing it from other types of canal craft such as: narrowboats, Thames sailing barges, Dutch barges, other barge types, GRP cabin cruisers, and wooden boats. Nevertheless, the salient features of a modern widebeam are:

A widebeam is built in the style of a cruising narrowboat, that is to say, a steel-hulled barge used mainly by leisure boaters. Typically, this entails a bow well-deck with doors leading aft to the living accommodation. The long saloon typically has numerous side-windows, and while its coachroof may have fitments such as solar panels and skylights. The overall height (as with a narrowboat) must be low enough to negotiate canal bridges. Echoing narrowboats, a widebeam's stern may be a cruiser stern or a "semi-trad"; but these days it is rare to see a widebeam with a traditional stern. Unlike some traditional narrowboats, a modern widebeam will rarely have a walk-through engine room with an antique engine such as a Bolinder; its engine will normally be found beneath the stern deck.

Whereas (except at the bow and stern) a narrowboat will normally have a rectangular cross-section below the gunwales, (although "Springer" narrowboats with V-shaped bilge sections are well-known), many widebeams may have a chined cross-section. A chined hull may steer more predictably than a flat-bottomed barge, because it holds a course more readily; and the chine allows the widebeam to approach closer to the canal bank where the canal is shallow or narrow.

== History ==
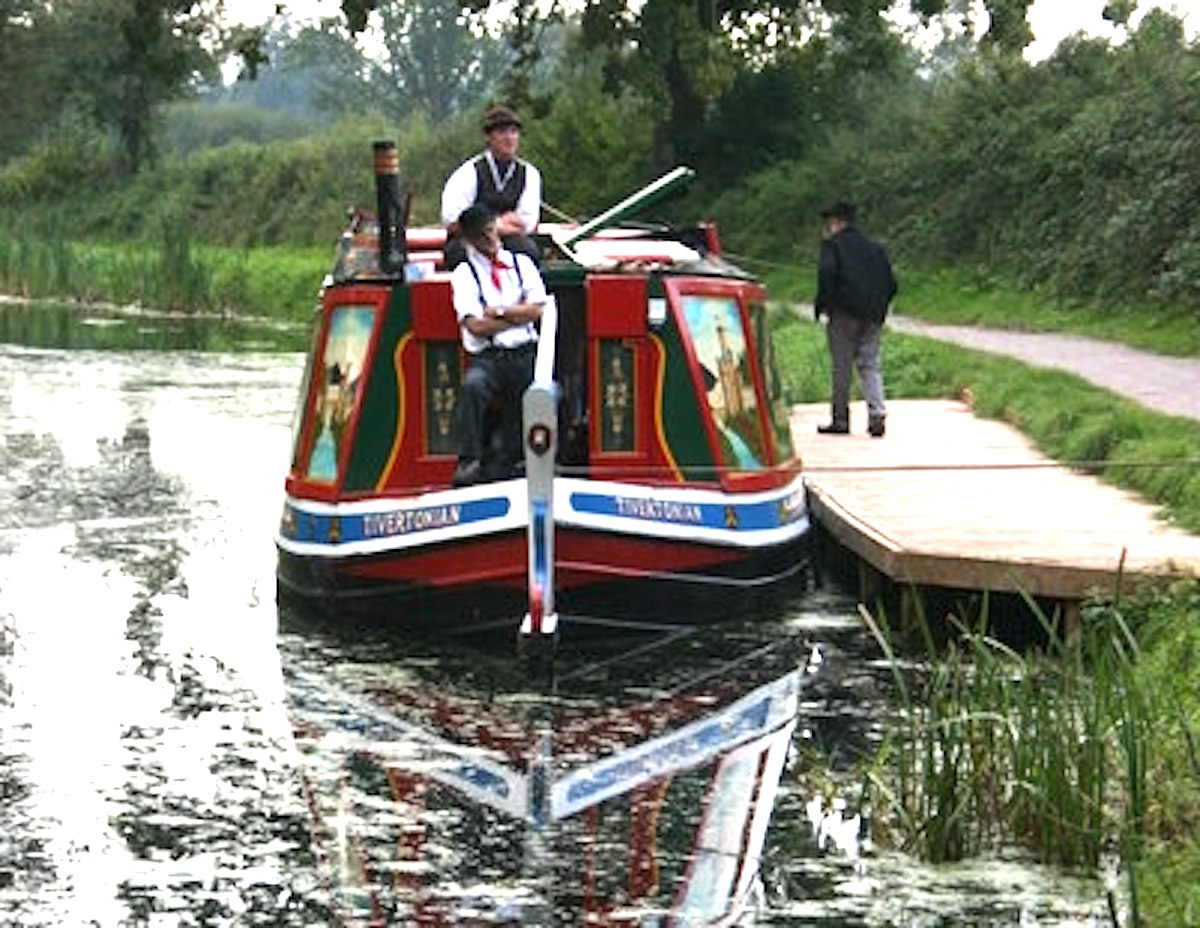
A horse-drawn widebeam working canal boat

When English canals were first built to assist transport during the Industrial Revolution, locks were only 2.1 metres (7 ft) wide. Most narrow locks are 21.9 m (72 ft) long, but some are only 17.7 m (58 ft). It was soon realised that it would be more efficient to have wider canals with wider 4.3 m (14 ft) locks, and widebeam boats were introduced to take advantage of this change. Of course, the wider locks also meant that two narrowboats could enter a lock side-by-side, which was particularly useful if the second boat was a towed "butty".

While a 17.4 m (57 ft) long narrowboat may travel the entirety of UK waterways, there is still no wide link between the north and the south of England, so widebeams must stay in one part or the other unless they are prepared to make the journey in the sea around the coast, a journey for which most widebeams are unsuited. (Occasionally narrowboats take to the sea, such as Terry Darlington's "Phyllis May", but both narrowboats and widebeams are Class D vessels fit for rivers, small lakes and canals. Inevitably, their greater beam makes widebeams more stable than narrowboats, but, with their bow welldeck vulnerable to flooding, they are still not true seagoing boats.

There is a plan to make a north-south canal link around Bedford. This would allow widebeams to move from the north to the south. But this canal extension may take decades to accomplish.

== Dimensions ==
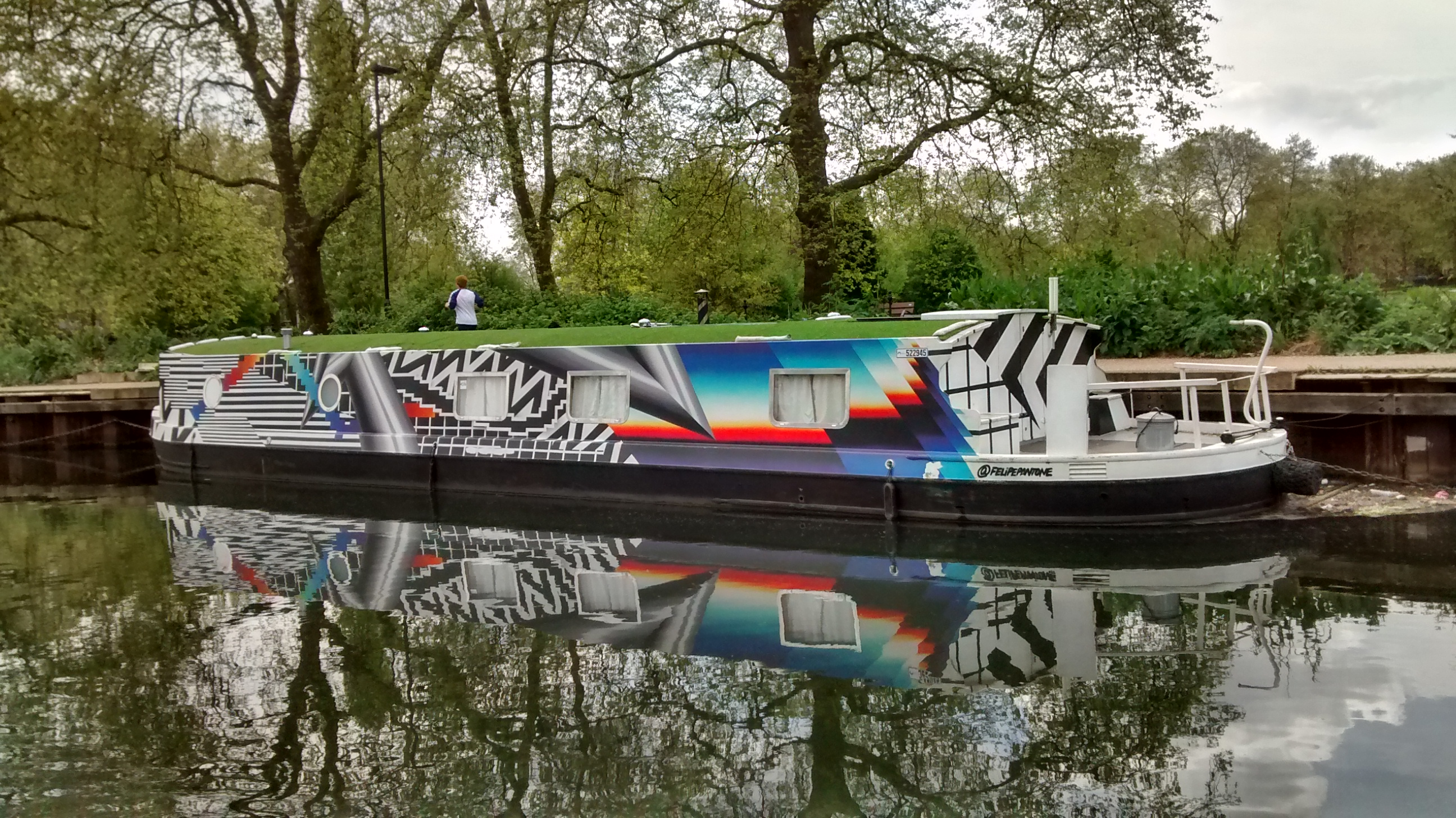
Dazzle camouflage, painted by Felipe Pantone, on the widebeam Growbeautifully moored on the Lee Navigation at Leyton Marshes

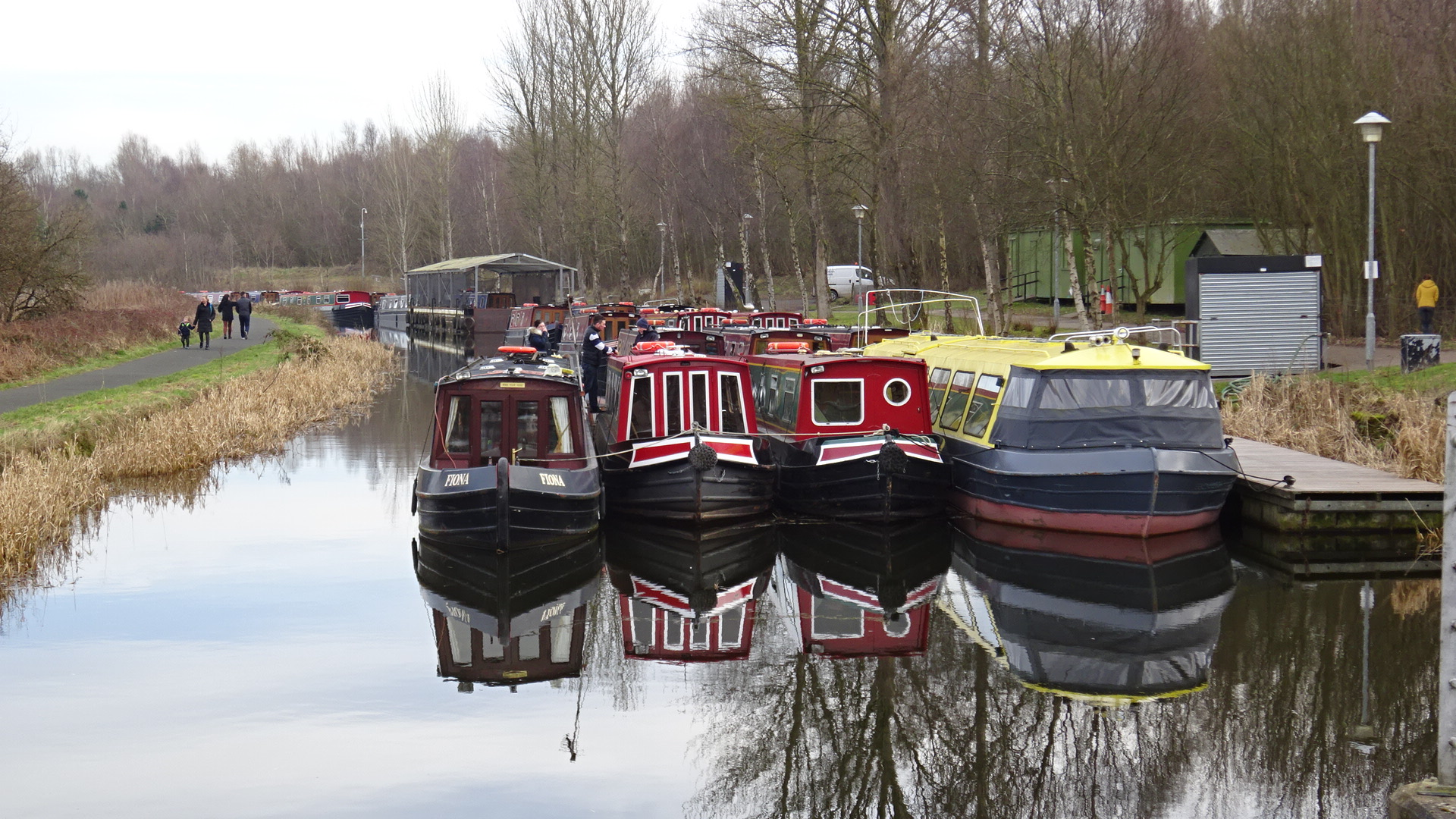
A widebeam moored inside three narrowboats in a canal basin in Falkirk, on the Forth & Clyde Canal

A widebeam has beam of 2.16 metres (7 ft 1 in) or more. Any widebeam with a permanent mooring and which is used a houseboat may be almost any size; but a widebeam intending to cruise the waterways must comply with size restrictions which depend on the dimensions of the waterway. A cruising widebeam's overall length (LOA) is limited by the length of the shortest lock, its beam by the width of the narrowest lock or some other width restriction, and its draft by the canal's depth. A canal is shallower at the sides than in the centre. Compared to narrowboats, this is a significant disadvantage for widebeams, particularly when meeting other boats.). A further restriction is that, if a cruising widebeam is to negotiate bridges and tunnels, its air draft must allow adequate clearance.

=== Dimensional restrictions on widebeams in and around London ===
In the East of London, if cruising only the Lee Navigation from Hertford to Limehouse Basin, a widebeam's maximum dimensions (length, beam, draft, and height, respectively) are 25.8 metres (84 ft 8 in), 4.7 metres (15 ft 5 in), 1.6 metres (5 ft 3 in), 2.18 metres (7 ft 2 in).

A widebeam that navigates through central London on the Regents Canal to Little Venice, is further restricted: its length, beam, and draft must not exceed 22.36 metres (73 ft 4 in), 4.22 metres (13 ft 10 in), 1.28 metres (4 ft 2 in). The height restriction of a boat on the Lee, due to low bridges, means that a boat that can cruise on the Lee Navigation is low enough to cruise on Regents Canal.

The section of the Paddington Arm of the Grand Union Canal to the junction of the main Grand Union has a further height restriction of 2.08 metres (6 ft 10 in).

At the junction of the Paddington Arm and the main Grand Union Canal, if the boat were to turn south through Brentford and navigate the Thames to Limehouse Basin, its maximum length is further restricted to 22.2 metres (72 ft 10 in). If the boat were to turn north and travel to Rickmansworth, its maximum length must not exceed 21.75 metres (71 ft 4 in).

From Rickmansworth, a boat may travel north up the Grand Union, but at Leighton Buzzard there is a lock that is only 3.81 metres (12 ft 6 in) wide. So any boat with a beam of 4.22 metres (13 ft 10 in) able to navigate canals and rivers in and around London will be unable able to proceed further north.

Any widebeam built for navigating on the Grand Union (south of Leighton Buzzard), the Regents Canal and the Lee Navigation will be unable to travel up the river Stort (a tributary of the Lea), unless its maximum dimensions do not exceed a length, beam, depth and height (respectively) of 21.75 metres (71 ft 4 in), 4.08 metres (13 ft 5 in), 1.03 metres (3 ft 5 in), 2.05 metres (6 ft 9 in).

Large navigable waterways in London north of the Thames
Waterway	Length	Beam	Depth	Height
Grand Union Canal (GUC)—Paddington Arm		4.3 metres (14 ft 1 in)		2.08 metres (6 ft 10 in)
Grand Union Canal—Brentford to Bulls Bridge	22.2 metres (72 ft 10 in)	4.26 metres (14 ft 0 in)	1.48 metres (4 ft 10 in)	2.88 metres (9 ft 5 in)
Grand Union Canal—Bulls Bridge to Rickmansworth	21.75 metres (71 ft 4 in)	4.26 metres (14 ft 0 in)	1.03 metres (3 ft 5 in)	2.34 metres (7 ft 8 in)
Lee Navigation	25.8 metres (84 ft 8 in)	4.7 metres (15 ft 5 in)	1.6 metres (5 ft 3 in)	2.18 metres (7 ft 2 in)
Regents Canal	22.36 metres (73 ft 4 in)	4.22 metres (13 ft 10 in)	1.28 metres (4 ft 2 in)	2.64 metres (8 ft 8 in)
Maximum size for unimpeded navigation of the above waterways	21.75 metres (71 ft 4 in)	4.22 metres (13 ft 10 in)	1.03 metres (3 ft 5 in)	2.08 metres (6 ft 10 in)
River Stort	26.8 metres (87 ft 11 in)	4.08 metres (13 ft 5 in)		2.05 metres (6 ft 9 in)
Maximum size for unimpeded navigation of all the waterways listed here	21.75 metres (71 ft 4 in)	4.08 metres (13 ft 5 in)	1.03 metres (3 ft 5 in)	2.05 metres (6 ft 9 in)
