= Barge =

Watercraft

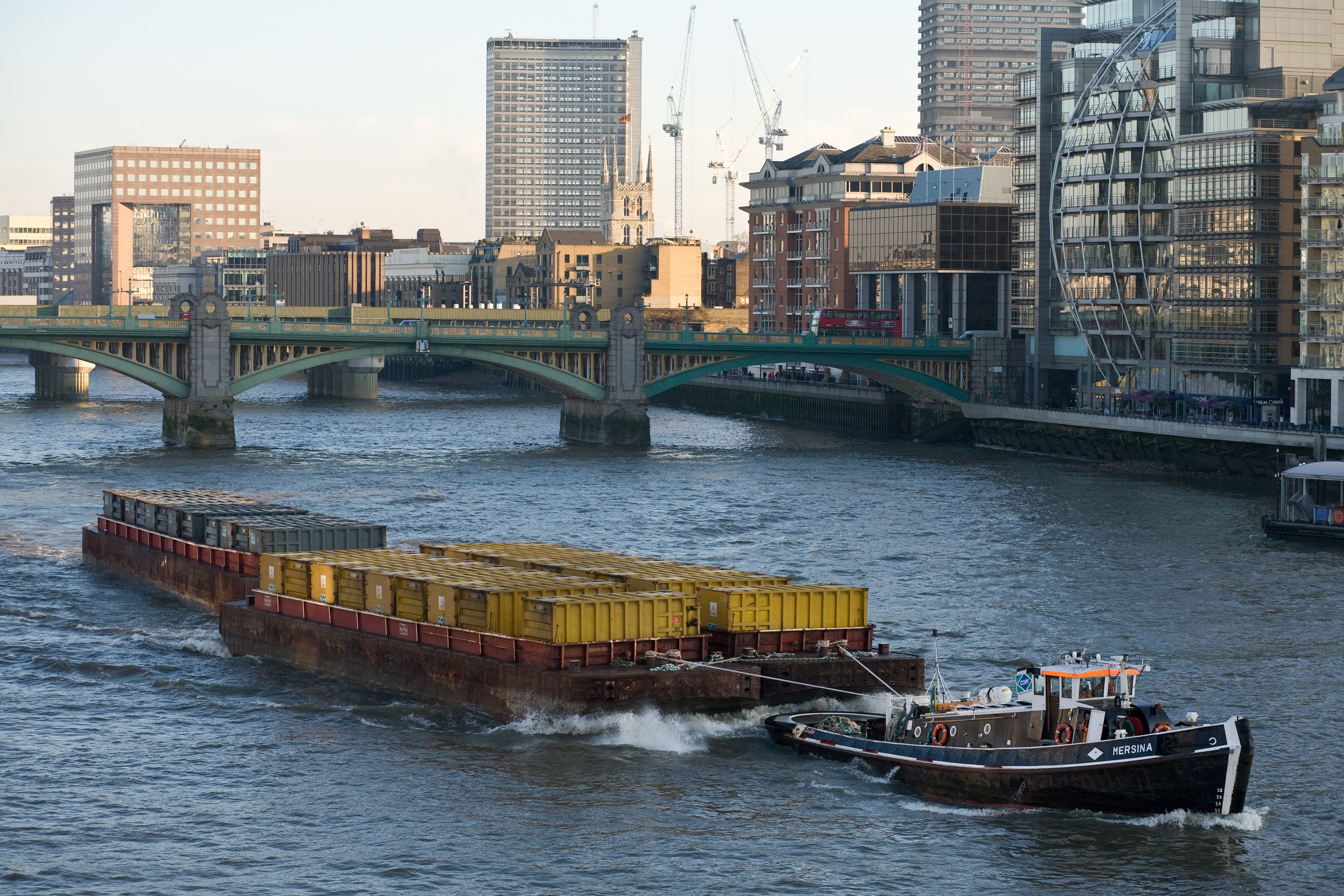
Barges towed by a tugboat on the River Thames in London, England, UK

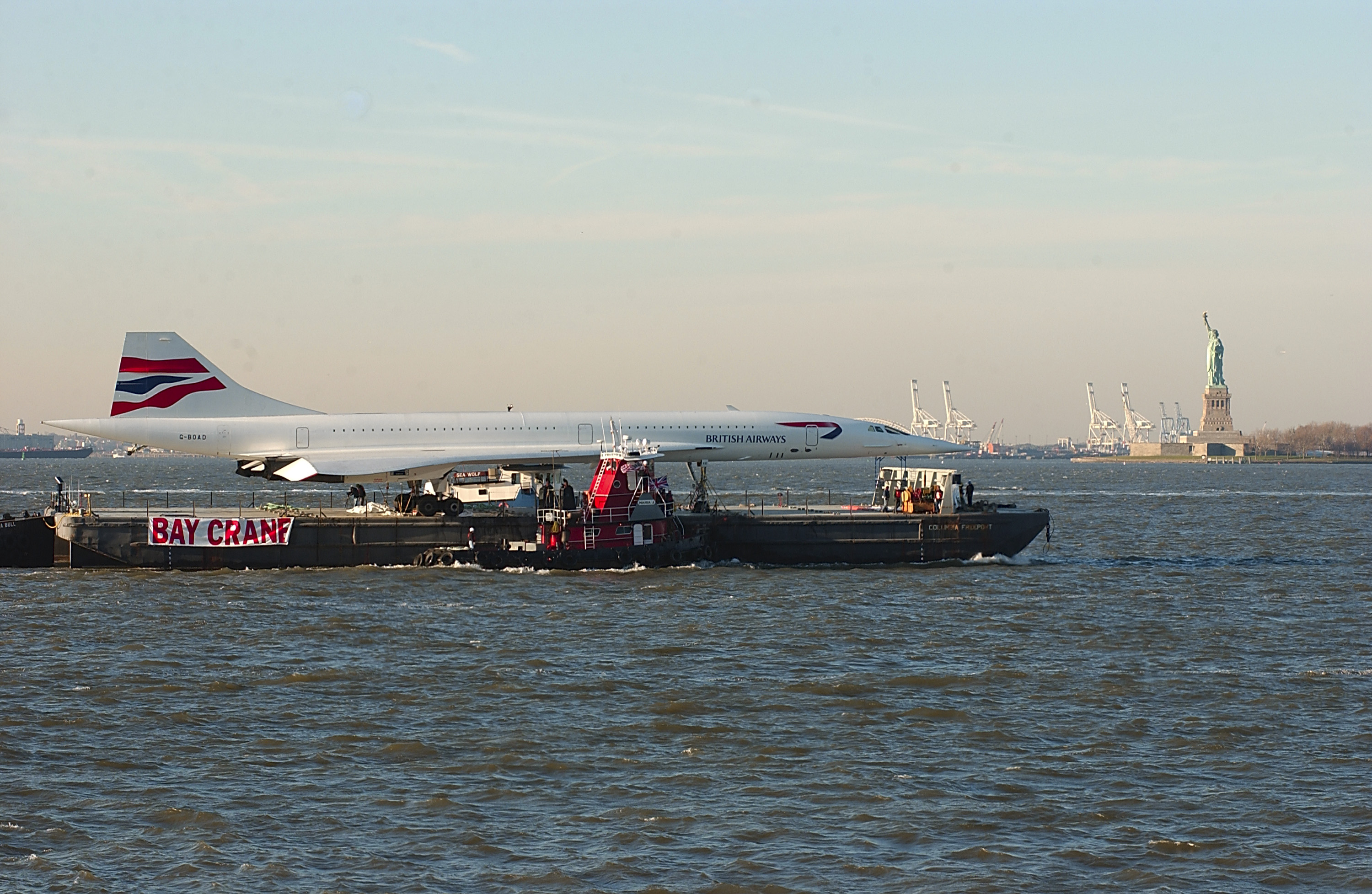
A British Airways Concorde being towed in New York City, United States. It is on a deck barge.

A barge is typically a flat-bottomed boat which does not have its own means of mechanical propulsion. Their original use was on inland waterways, while modern use is on both inland and marine water environments. The first modern barges were pulled by tugs, but on inland waterways, most are pushed by pusher boats, or other vessels. The term barge has a rich history, and therefore there are many types of barges.

== History of the barge ==
=== Etymology ===
Barge is attested from 1300, from Old French barge, from Vulgar Latin barga. The word originally could refer to any small boat; the modern meaning arose around 1480. Bark "small ship" is attested from 1420, from Old French barque, from Vulgar Latin barca (400 AD). A more precise meaning (see Barque) arose in the 17th century and often takes the French spelling for disambiguation. Both are probably derived from the Latin barica, from Greek baris "Egyptian boat", from Coptic bari "small boat", hieroglyphic Egyptian

D58 G29 M17 M17 D21 P1

and similar ba-y-r for "basket-shaped boat". By extension, the term "embark" literally means to board the kind of boat called a "barque".

=== British river barges ===
==== 18th century ====
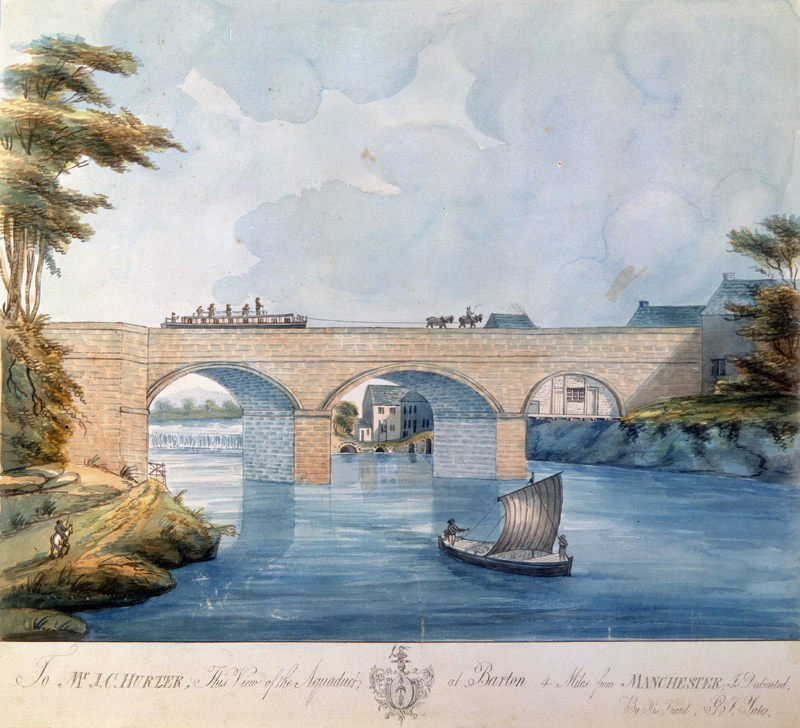
River barge below Barton Aqueduct c. 1793

In Great Britain, a merchant barge was originally a flat bottomed merchant vessel for use on navigable rivers. Most of these barges had sails. For traffic on the River Severn, the barge was described thus: "The lesser sort are called barges and frigates, being from forty to sixty feet in length, having a single mast and square sail, and carrying from twenty to forty tons burthen." The larger vessels were called trows. On the River Irwell, there was reference to barges passing below Barton Aqueduct with their mast and sails standing. Early barges on the Thames were called west country barges.

==== 19th century ====
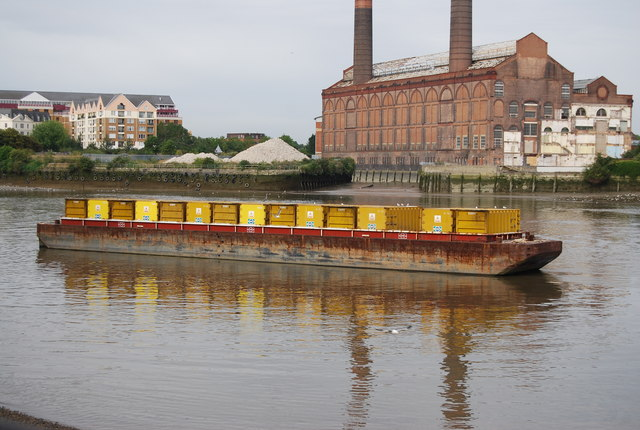
Dumb barge on the Thames

In the United Kingdom, the word barge had many meanings by the 1890s, and these varied locally. On the Mersey, a barge was called a 'Flat', on the Thames a Lighter or barge, and on the Humber a 'Keel'. A Lighter had neither mast nor rigging. A keel did have a single mast with sails. Barge and lighter were used indiscriminately. A local distinction was that any flat that was not propelled by steam was a barge, although it might be a sailing flat.

The term Dumb barge was probably taken into use to end the confusion. The term Dumb barge surfaced in the early nineteenth century. It first denoted the use of a barge as a mooring platform in a fixed place. As it went up and down with the tides, it made a very convenient mooring place for steam vessels. Within a few decades, the term dumb barge evolved and came to mean: 'a vessel propelled by oars only'. By the 1890s, Dumb barge was still used only on the Thames.

A Dutch barge in Namur, Belgium

By 1880, barges on British rivers and canals were often towed by steam tugboats. On the Thames, many dumb barges still relied on their poles, oars and the tide. Others dumb barges made use of about 50 tugboats to tow them to their destinations. While many coal barges were towed, many dumb barges that handled single parcels were not.

==== The Thames barge and Dutch barge today ====
On the British river system and larger waterways, the Thames sailing barge, and Dutch barge and unspecified other styles of barge, are still known as barges. The term Dutch barge is nowadays often used to refer to an accommodation ship, but originally refers to the slightly larger Dutch version of the Thames sailing barge.

=== British canals: narrowboats and widebeams ===
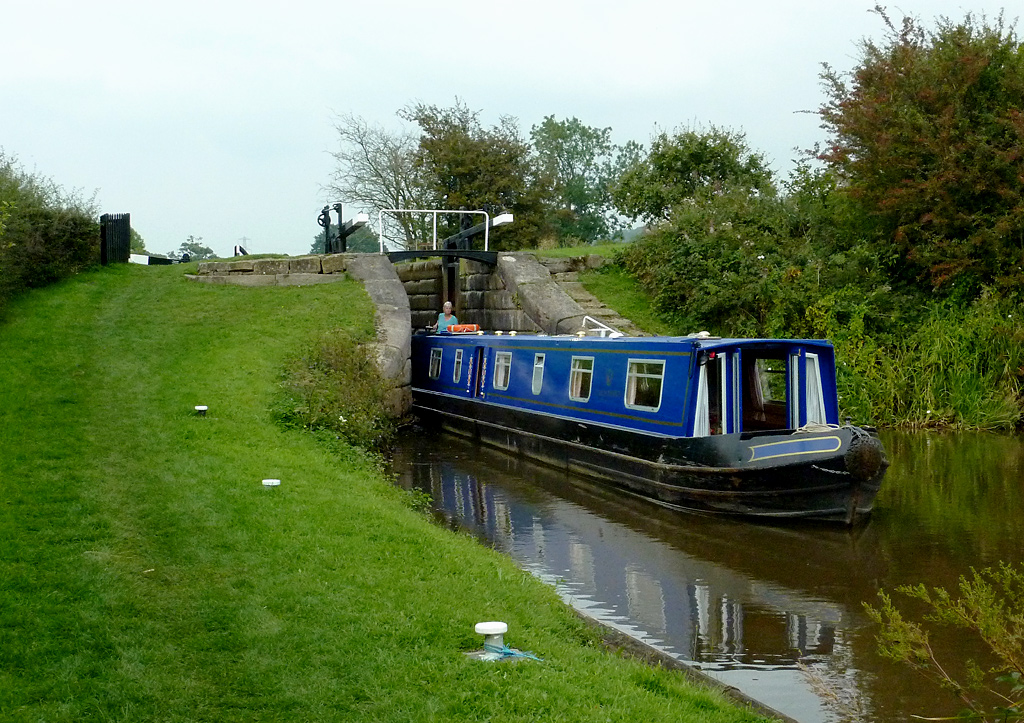
A narrowboat exiting a narrow British canal lock, Bosley Locks No 2

During the Industrial Revolution, a substantial network of canals was developed in Great Britain from 1750 onward. Whilst the largest of these could accommodate ocean-going vessels, e.g. the later Manchester Ship Canal, a complex network of smaller canals was also developed. These smaller canals had locks, bridges and tunnels that were at minimum only 7 feet (2.1 m) wide at the waterline. On wider sections, standard barges and other vessels could trade, but full access to the network necessitated the parallel development of the narrowboat, which usually had a beam a couple of inches less to allow for clearance, e.g. 6 feet 10 inches (2.08 m) . It was soon realized that the narrow locks were too limiting, and later locks were therefore doubled in width to 14 feet (4.3 m). This led to the development of the widebeam canal boat. The narrowboat (one word) definition in the Oxford English Dictionary is:

Narrowboat: a British canal boat of traditional long, narrow design, steered with a tiller; spec. one not exceeding 7 feet (approx. 2.1 metres) in width or 72 feet (approx. 21.9 metres) in length

The narrowboats were initially also known as barges, and the new canals were constructed with an adjacent towpath along which draft horses walked, towing the barges. These types of canal craft are so specific that on the British canal system the term 'barge' is no longer used to describe narrowboats and widebeams. Narrowboats and widebeams are still seen on canals, mostly for leisure cruising, and now engine-powered.

=== Crew and pole ===
The people who moved barges were known as lightermen. Poles are used on barges to fend off other nearby vessels or a wharf. These are often called 'pike poles'. The long pole used to maneuver or propel a barge has given rise to the saying "I wouldn't touch that [subject/thing] with a barge pole."

=== The 19th century American barge ===
In the United States a barge was not a sailing vessel by the end of the 19th century. Indeed, barges were often created by cutting down (razeeing) sailing vessels. In New York this was an accepted meaning of the term barge. The somewhat smaller scow was built as such, but the scow also had its sailing counterpart the sailing scow.

== The modern barge ==
=== The iron barge ===
The innovation that led to the modern barge was the use of iron barges towed by a steam tugboat. These were first used to transport grain and other bulk products. From about 1840 to 1870 the towed iron barge was quickly introduced on the Rhine, Danube, Don, Dniester, and rivers in Egypt, India and Australia. Many of these barges were built in Great Britain.

Nowadays 'barge' generally refers to a dumb barge. In Europe, a Dumb barge is: An inland waterway transport freight vessel designed to be towed which does not have its own means of mechanical propulsion. In America, a barge is generally pushed.

=== Modern use ===
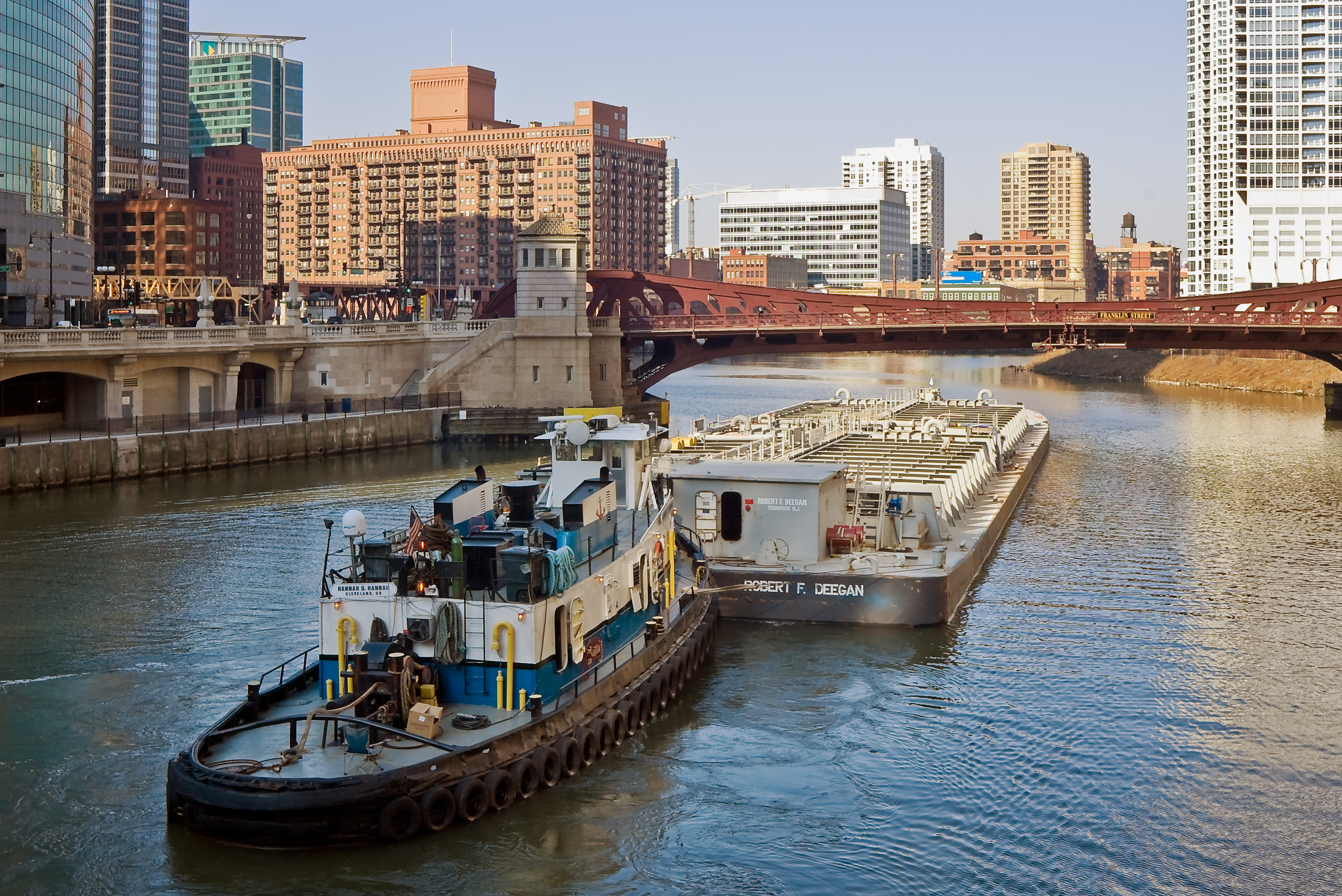
Canal style tugboat pushing a barge on the Chicago River

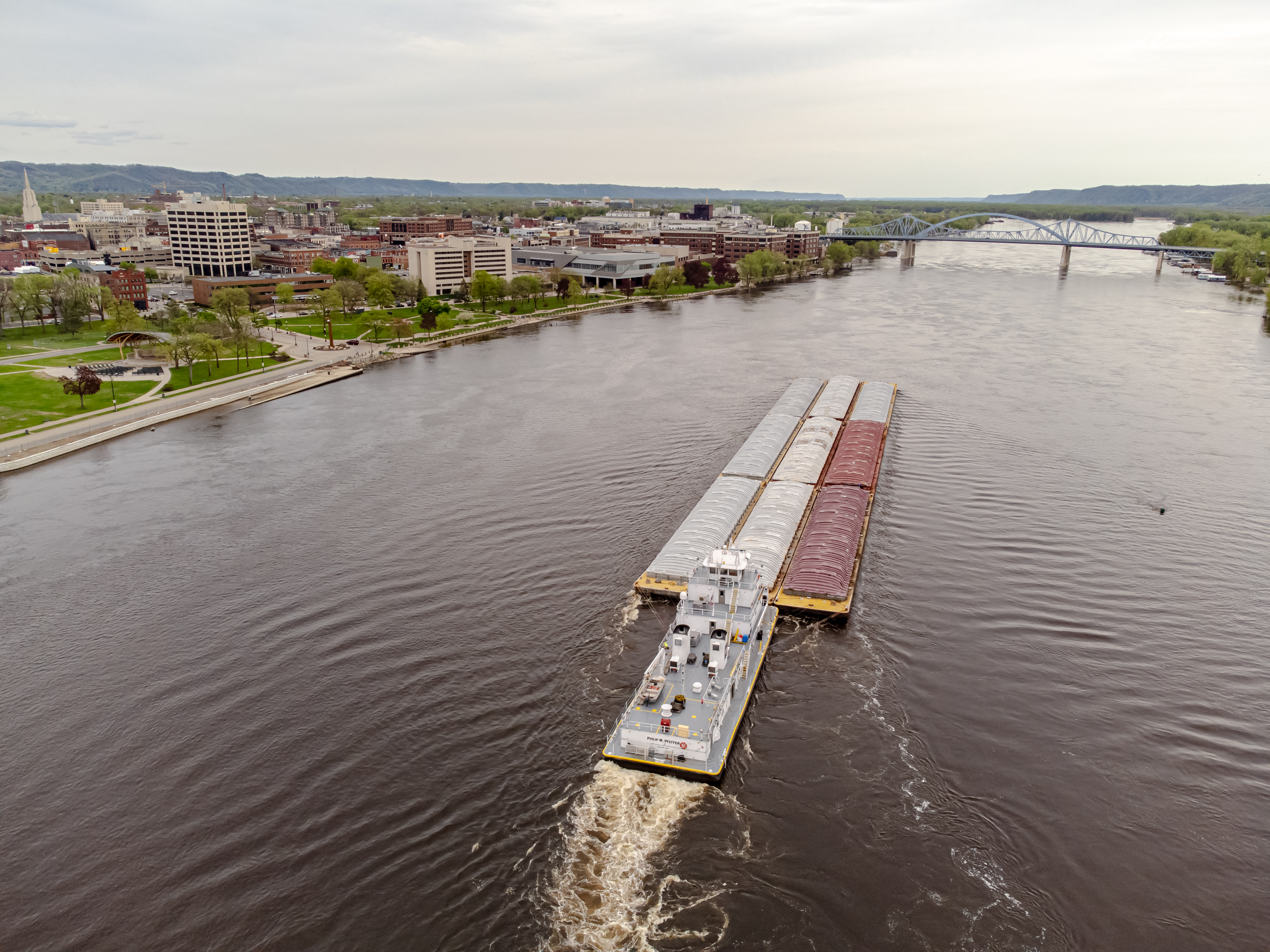
3×3 nine unit barge going through La Crosse, Wisconsin

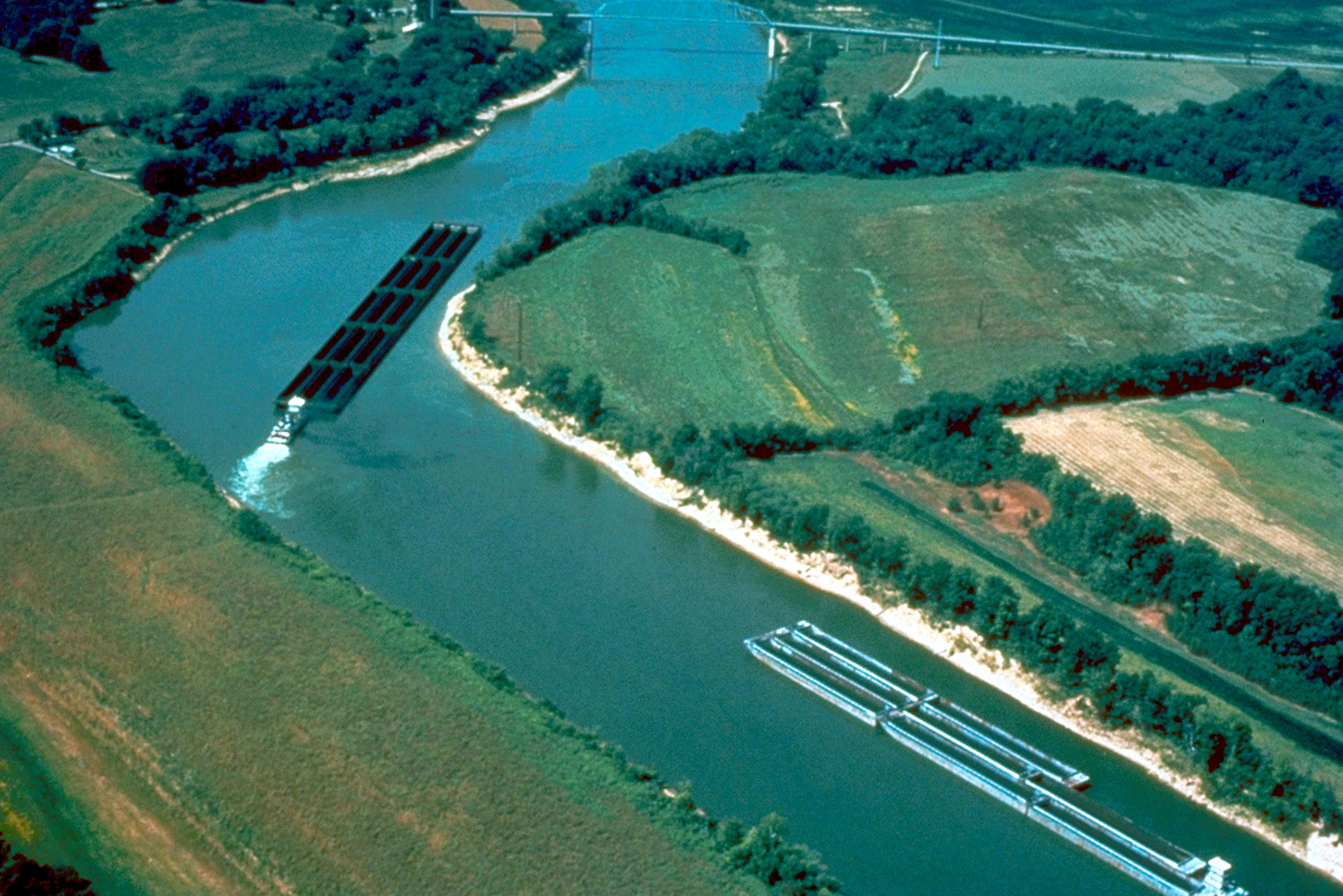
Multiple barges pushed around a tight bend on the Cumberland River

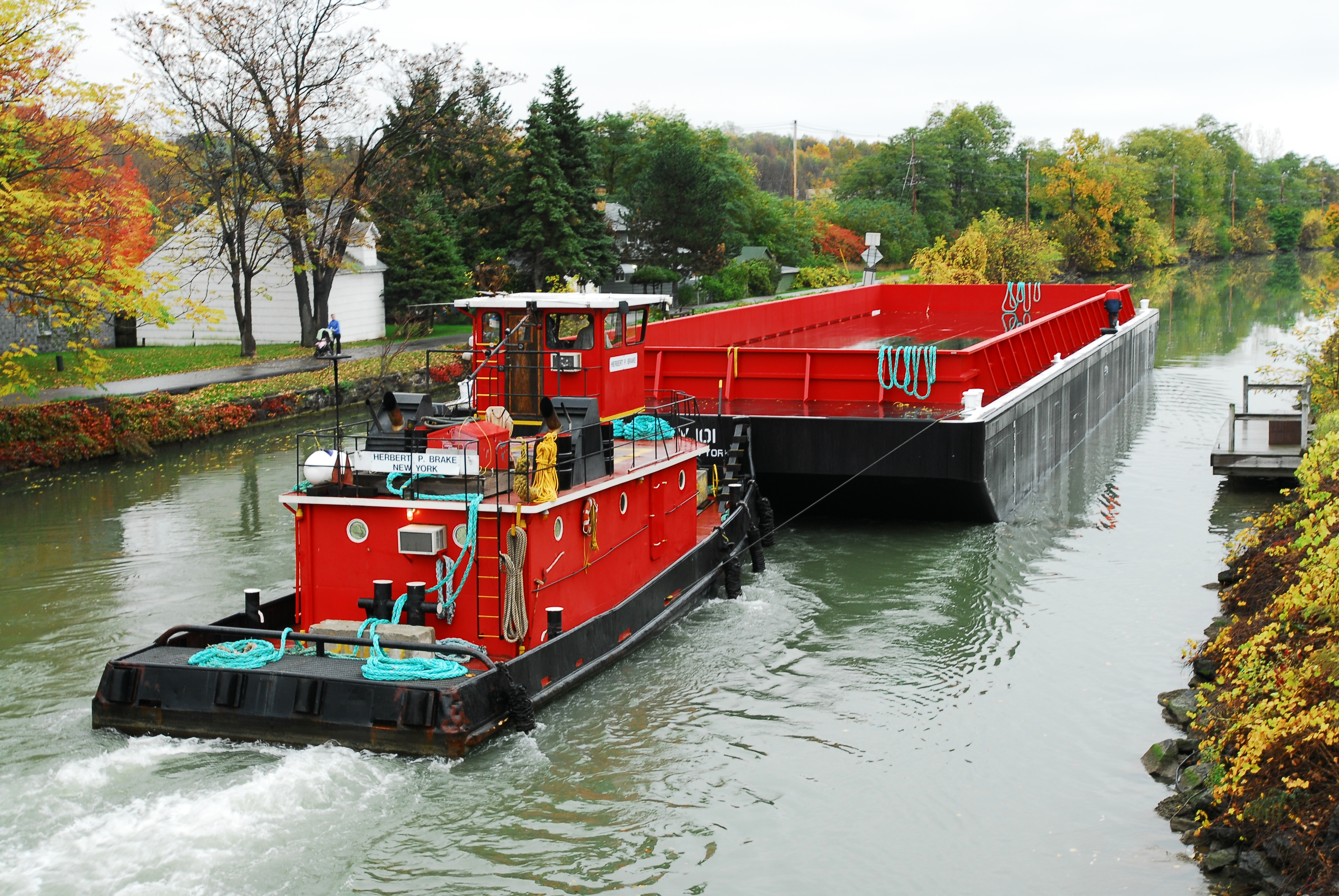
Towboat Herbert P. Brake of New York pushes a new barge east on the Erie Canal in Fairport, New York, United States

Barges are used today for transporting low-value bulk items, as the cost of hauling goods that way is very low and for larger project cargo, such as offshore wind turbine blades. Barges are also used for very heavy or bulky items; a typical American barge measures 195 by 35 feet (59.4 m × 10.7 m), and can carry up to about 1,500 short tons (1,400 t) of cargo. The most common European barges measure 251 by 37 feet (76.5 m × 11.4 m) and can carry up to about 2,450 tonnes (2,700 short tons).

As an example, on June 26, 2006, in the US a 565-short-ton (513 t) catalytic cracking unit reactor was shipped by barge from the Tulsa Port of Catoosa in Oklahoma to a refinery in Pascagoula, Mississippi. Extremely large objects are normally shipped in sections and assembled after delivery, but shipping an assembled unit reduces costs and avoids reliance on construction labor at the delivery site, which in the case of the reactor was still recovering from Hurricane Katrina. Of the reactor's 700-mile (1,100 km) journey, only about 40 miles (64 km) were traveled overland, from the final port to the refinery.

The Transportation Institute at Texas A&M found that inland barge transportation in the US produces far fewer emissions of carbon dioxide for each ton of cargo moved compared to transport by truck or rail. According to the study, transporting cargo by barge produces 43% less greenhouse gas emissions than rail and more than 800% less than trucks. Environmentalists claim that in areas where barges, tugboats and towboats idle may produce more emissions like in the locks and dams of the Mississippi River.

Self-propelled barges may be used for traveling downstream or upstream in placid waters; they are operated as an unpowered barge, with the assistance of a tugboat, when traveling upstream in faster waters. Canal barges are usually made for the particular canal in which they will operate.

Unpowered vessels—barges—may be used for other purposes, such as large accommodation vessels, towed to where they are needed and stationed there as long as necessary. An example is the Bibby Stockholm.

== Types ==
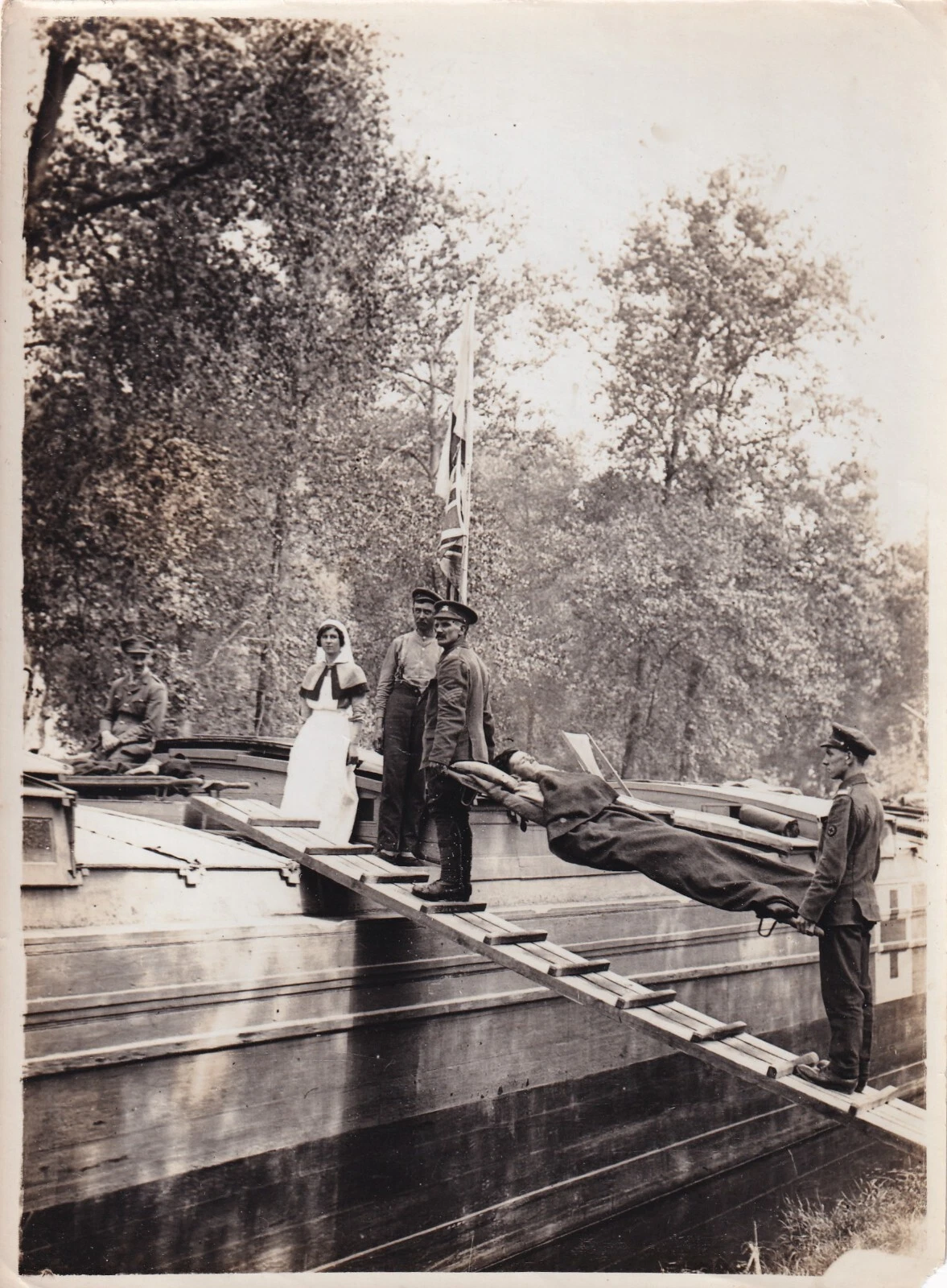
British Royal Army Medical Corps troops carrying men wounded during the Battle of the Somme aboard a hospital barge on the Somme Canal, Vaux-sur-Somme, France, 25 August 1916

- Articulated tug and barge – Boat that maneuvers other vessels by pushing or towing them
- Barracks barge – Watercraft used as military accommodation ("accommodation barge")
- Canal motorship – Motorship on the Erie Canal, New York, USA
- Car float – Unpowered barge with railroad tracks mounted on its deck
- Ferrocement or "Concrete" Barge – Type of World War II barge
- Crane barge – Ship with a crane specialized for lifting heavy loads
- Dredger – Excavation of sediment, usually under water
- Deck barge – Type of World War II barge
- Dutch barge – Flat-bottomed shoal-draught sailing barge
- Dry bulk cargo barge – Vessel designed to carry freight in bulk format
- Flexible barge – Watercraft
- Gundalow – Type of New England sailing barge
- Hopper barge – Type of barge for bulk cargo
- Horse-drawn boat – Canal boat pulled by a horse on a towpath
- Hospital barge – Barge used to treat and transport wounded soldiers
- Hotel barge – Barge that has been built or converted to serve as a hotel
- Jackup barge – Type of mobile platform
- Landing craft – Seagoing watercraft
- Lighter – Type of flat-bottomed barge
- Liquid cargo barge – Barge that transports petrochemicals
- Narrowboat – Type of British canal boat
- Norfolk wherry – Type of boat on The Broads in Norfolk, England
- Rocket landing barge – Floating landing platform operated by SpaceX
- Paddle barge – Water sport
- Péniche – Type of ship or Spitz barge
- Pleasure barge – Flat-bottomed, slow-moving boat used for leisure
- Power barge – Floating power station
- Royal barge – Vessel used by a monarch for ceremonial processions
- Severn trow – Type of British river cargo boat
- Showboat – Floating theater
- Thames sailing barge – Type of commercial sailing boat
- Tub boat – Canal cargo boat
- Type B ship – Type of World War II barge
- Whaleback barge – Type of cargo steamship
- Widebeam – Canal boat in the style of a British narrowboat with a wider beam

In the United States, "deck barge" may refer to flat deck barges, work flats, fuel flats or flats. Smaller flats are used in shipyards to permit workers to access vessels in drydocks.

== Gallery ==
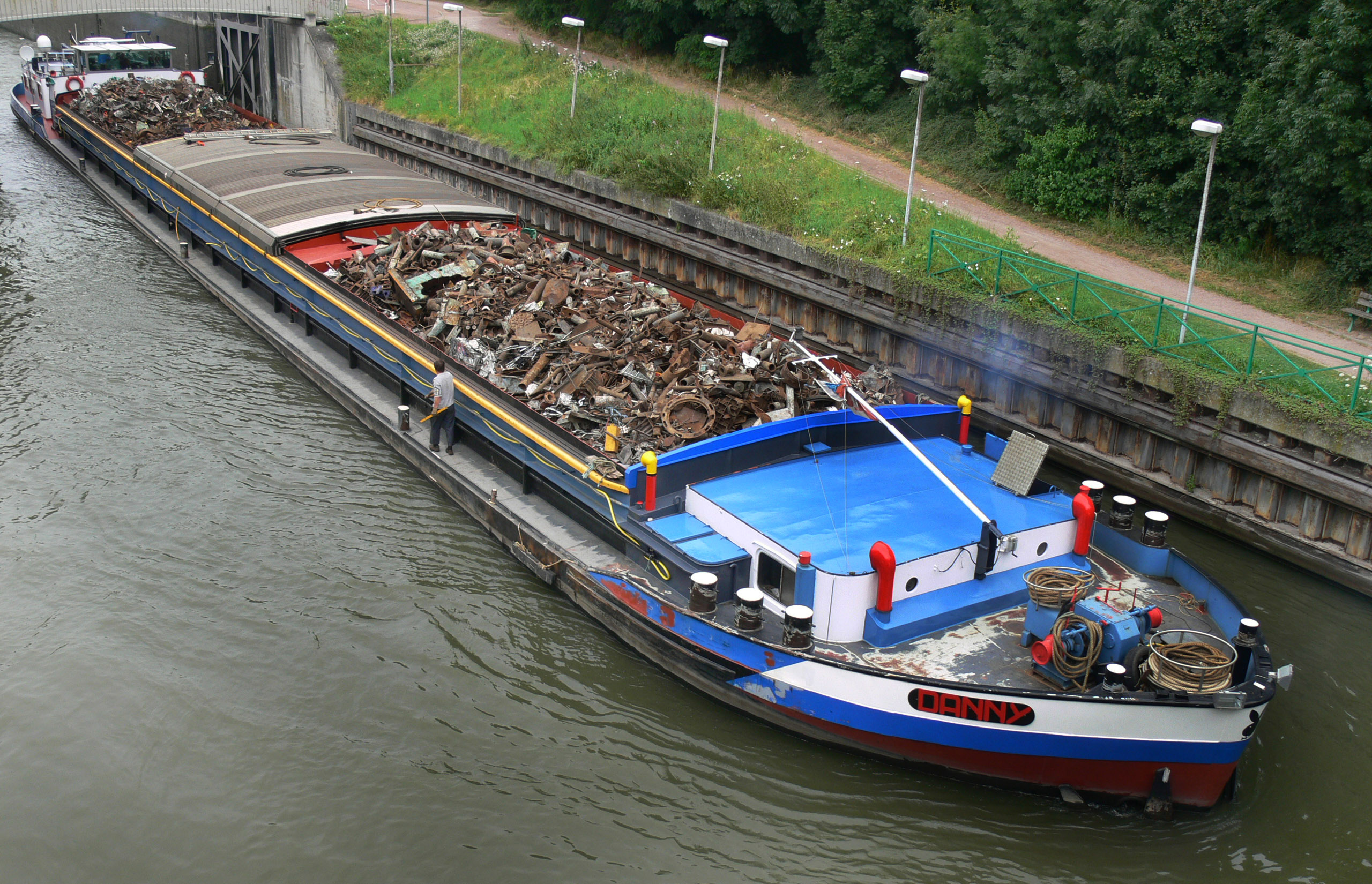
A self propelled barge carrying recycling material on Deûle channel in Lambersart, France

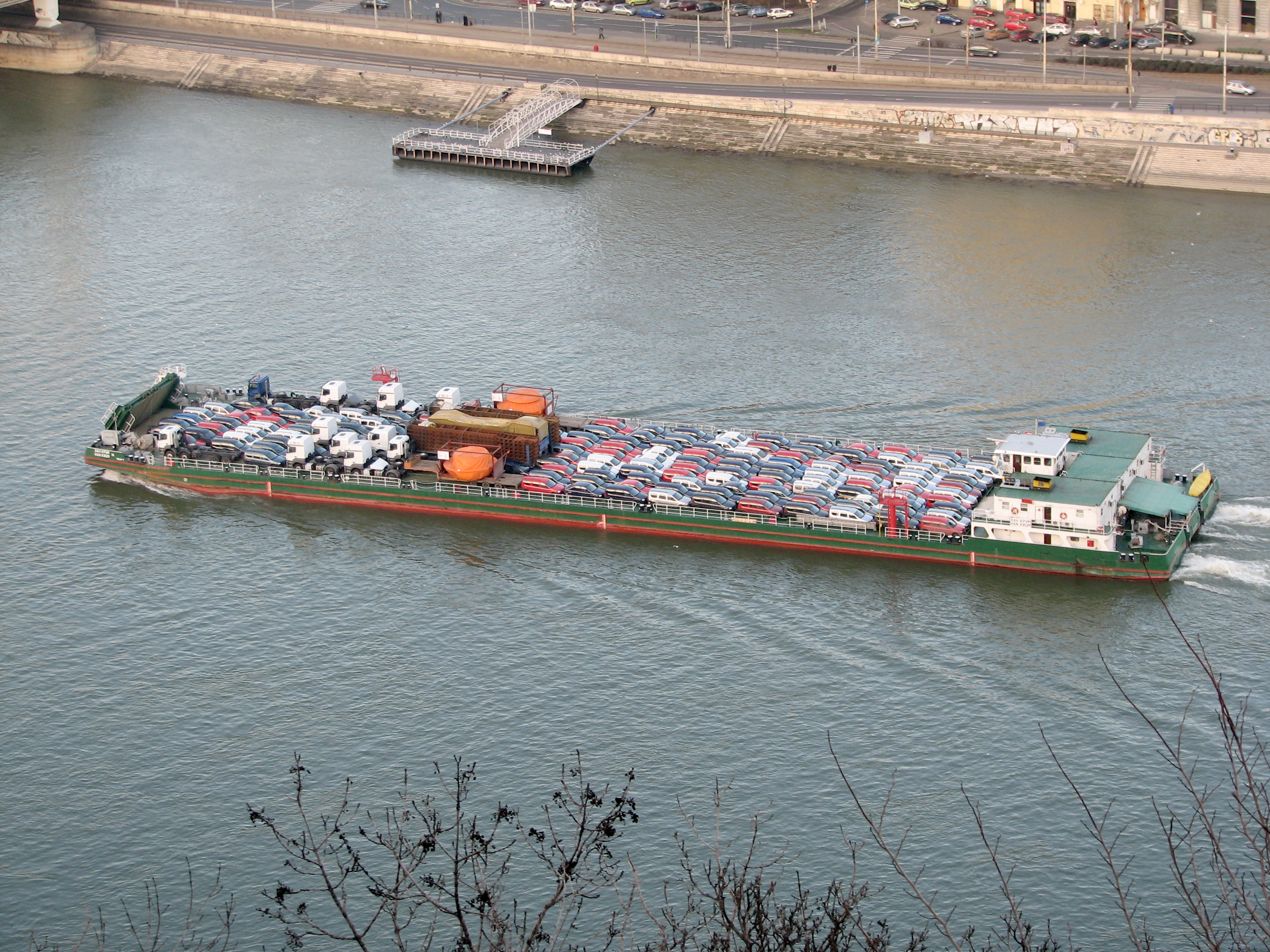
Self-propelled car barge on the River Danube

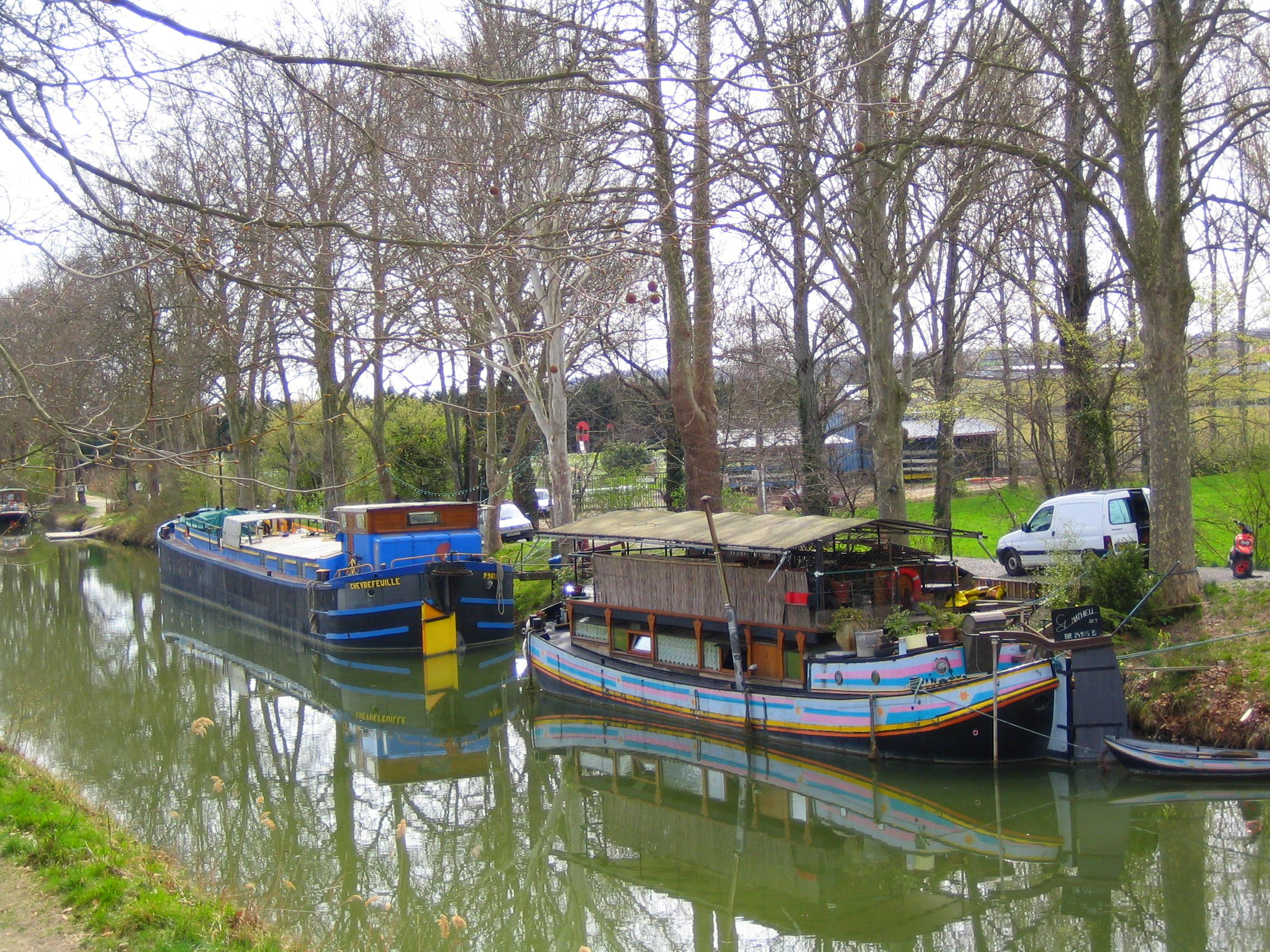
Barges near Toulouse, France

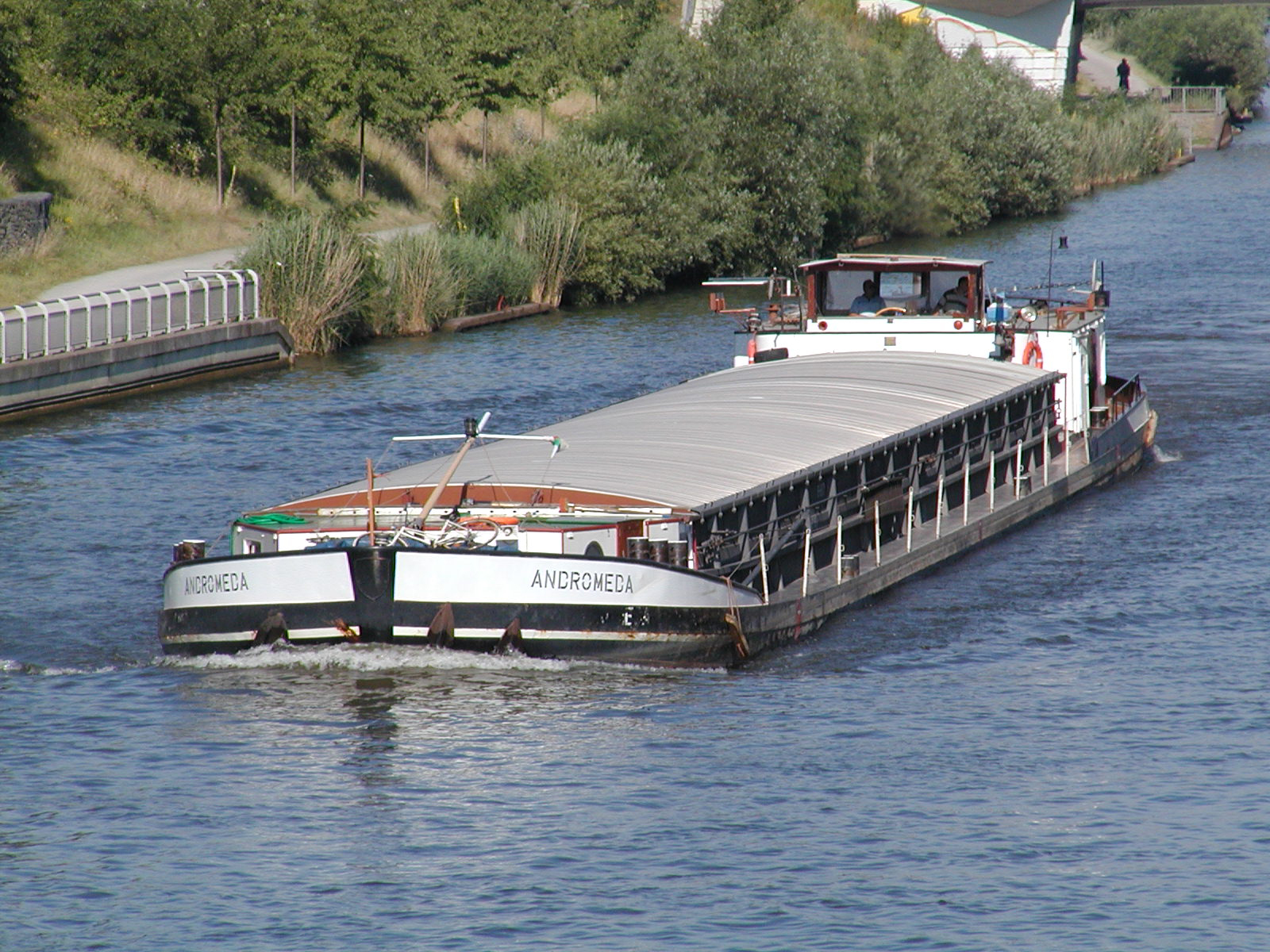
Self-propelled barge Andromeda in canal at Hanover, Germany

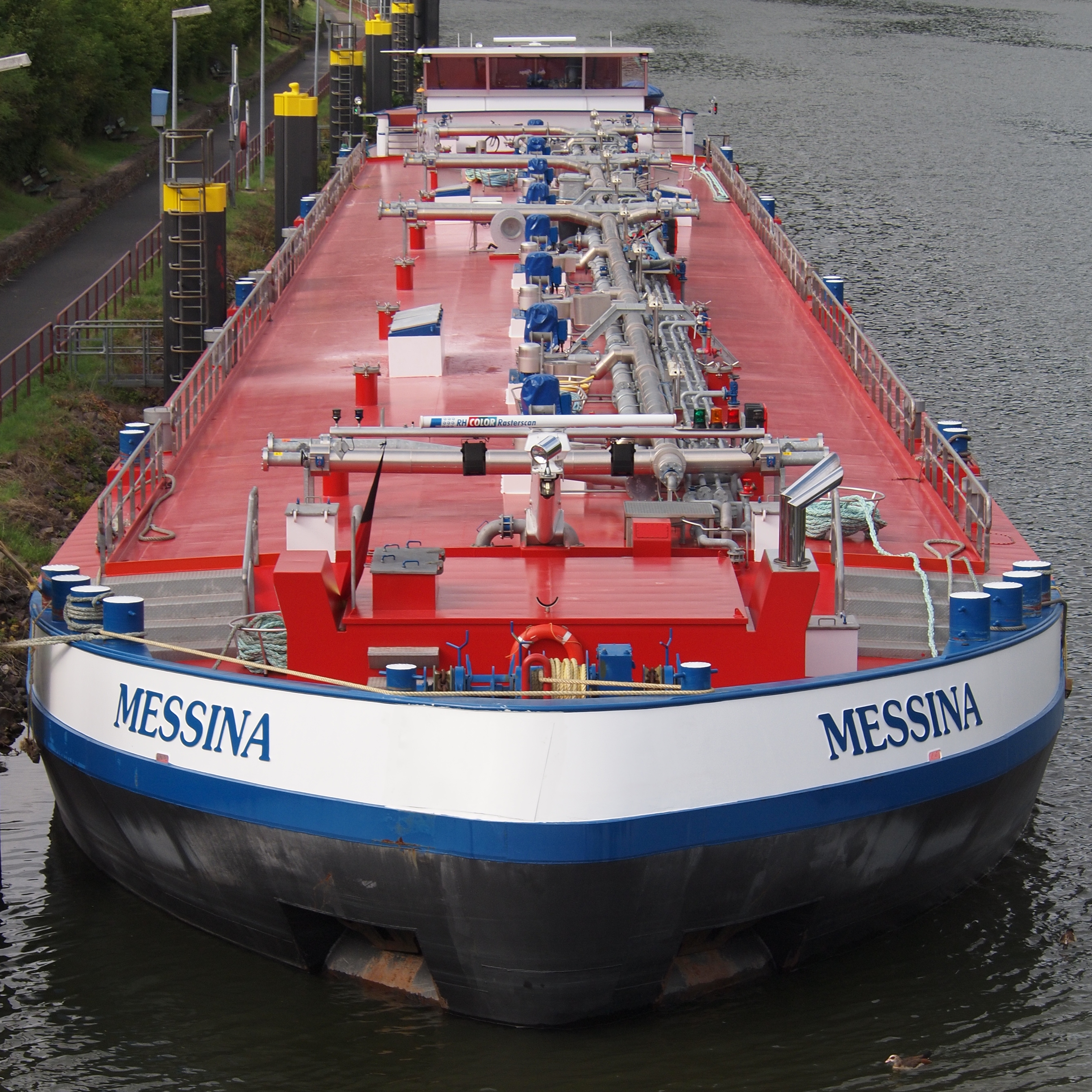
Tank barge on the River Moselle, Germany

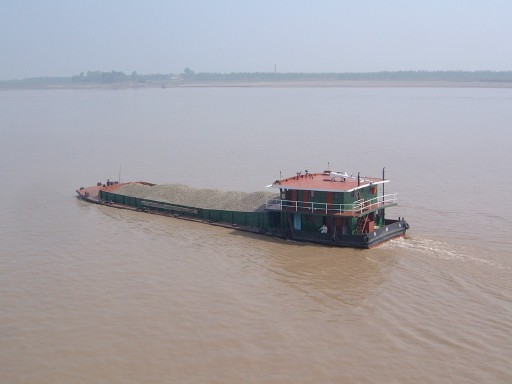
Self-propelled barge carrying bulk crushed stone

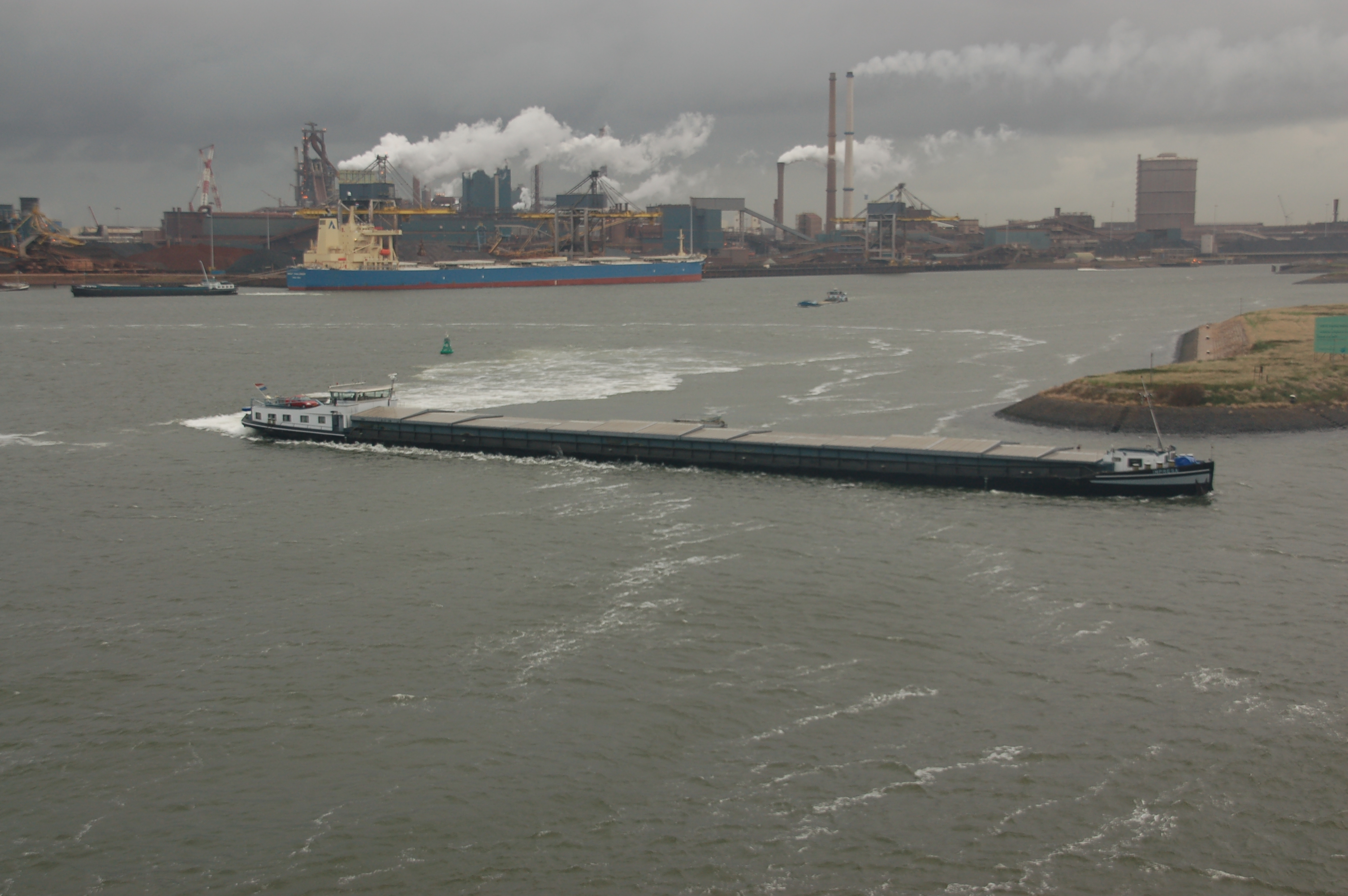
Self-propelled barge in the port of IJmuiden, Netherlands

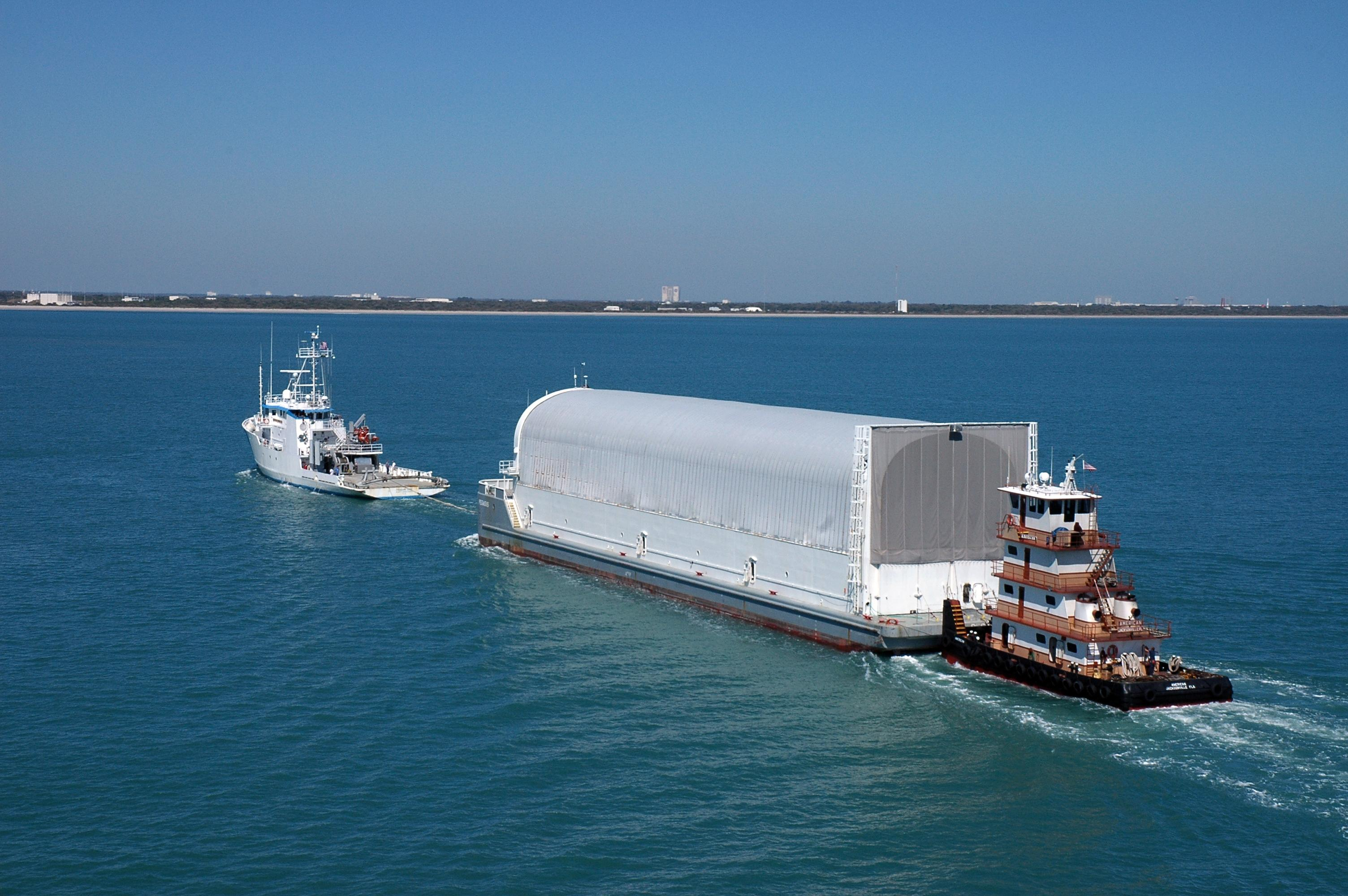
Deck barge carrying the Space Shuttle external tank for STS-119 under tow to Port Canaveral, Florida, United States

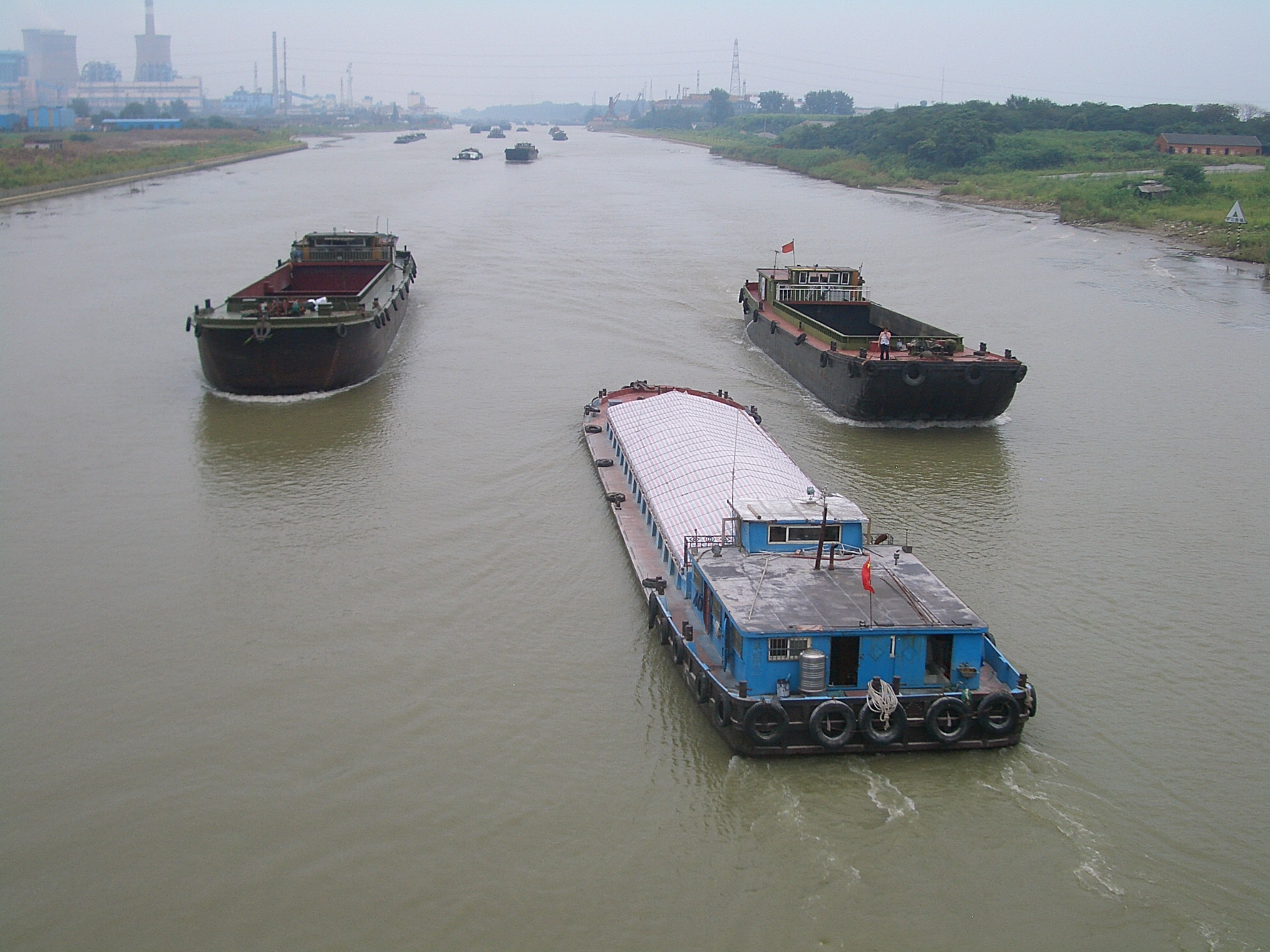
Self-propelled barges on the Grand Canal of China near Yangzhou, Jiangsu, China

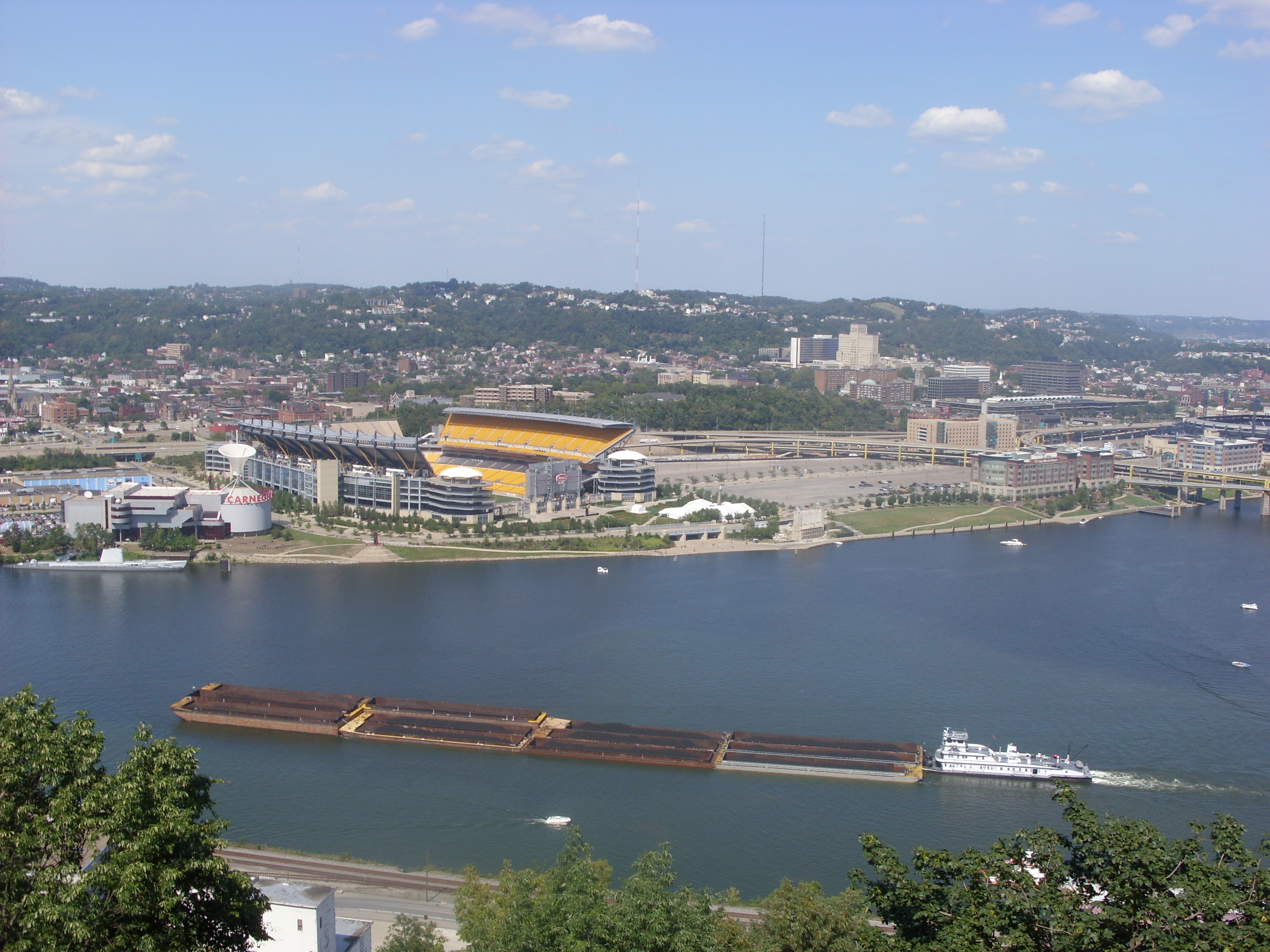
Coal barges passing Heinz Field in Pittsburgh, Pennsylvania on the Ohio River

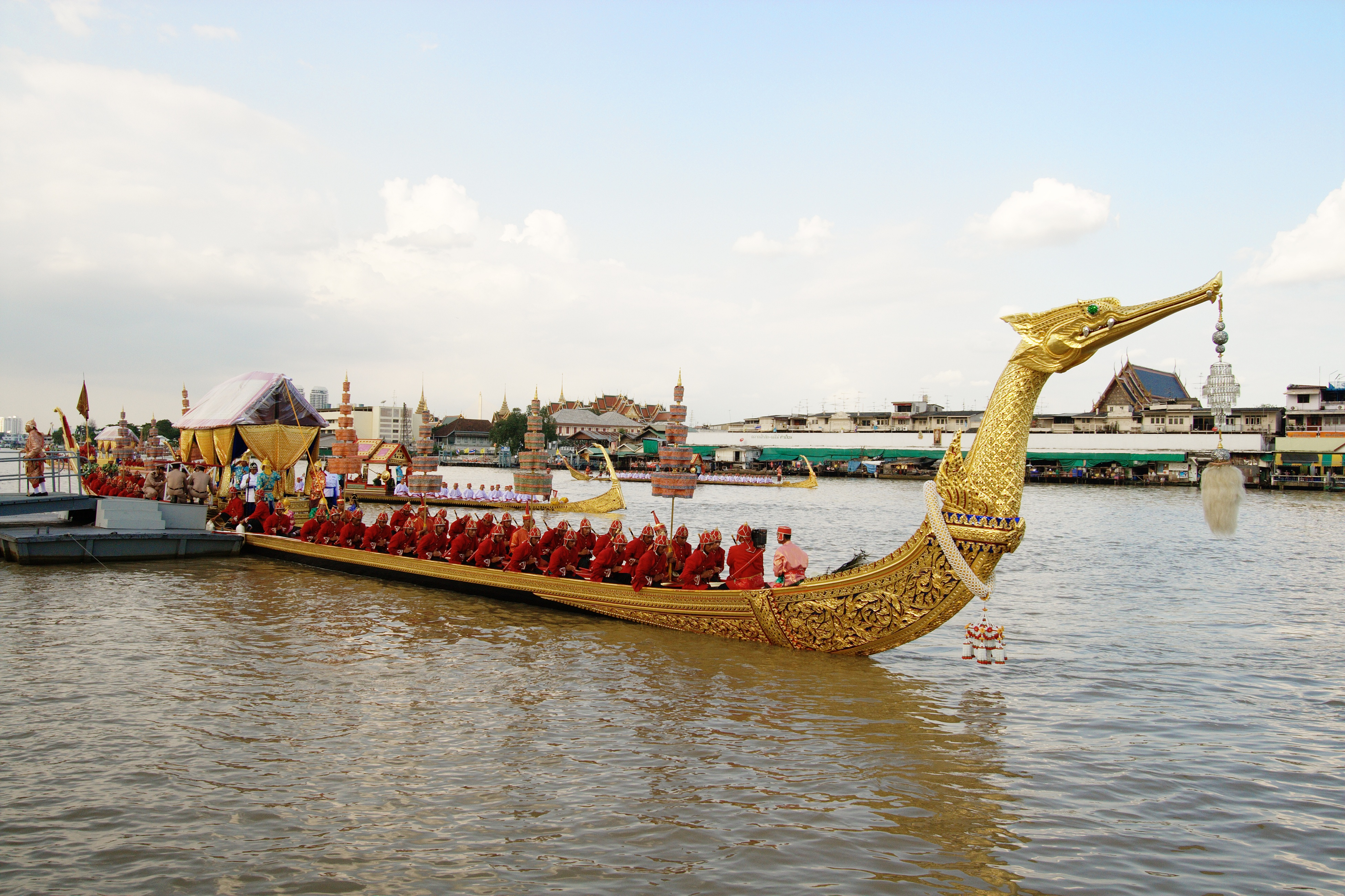
Royal Barge Suphannahong docked at Wat Arun pier, one of the Thai royal barges featured in the royal barge ceremony

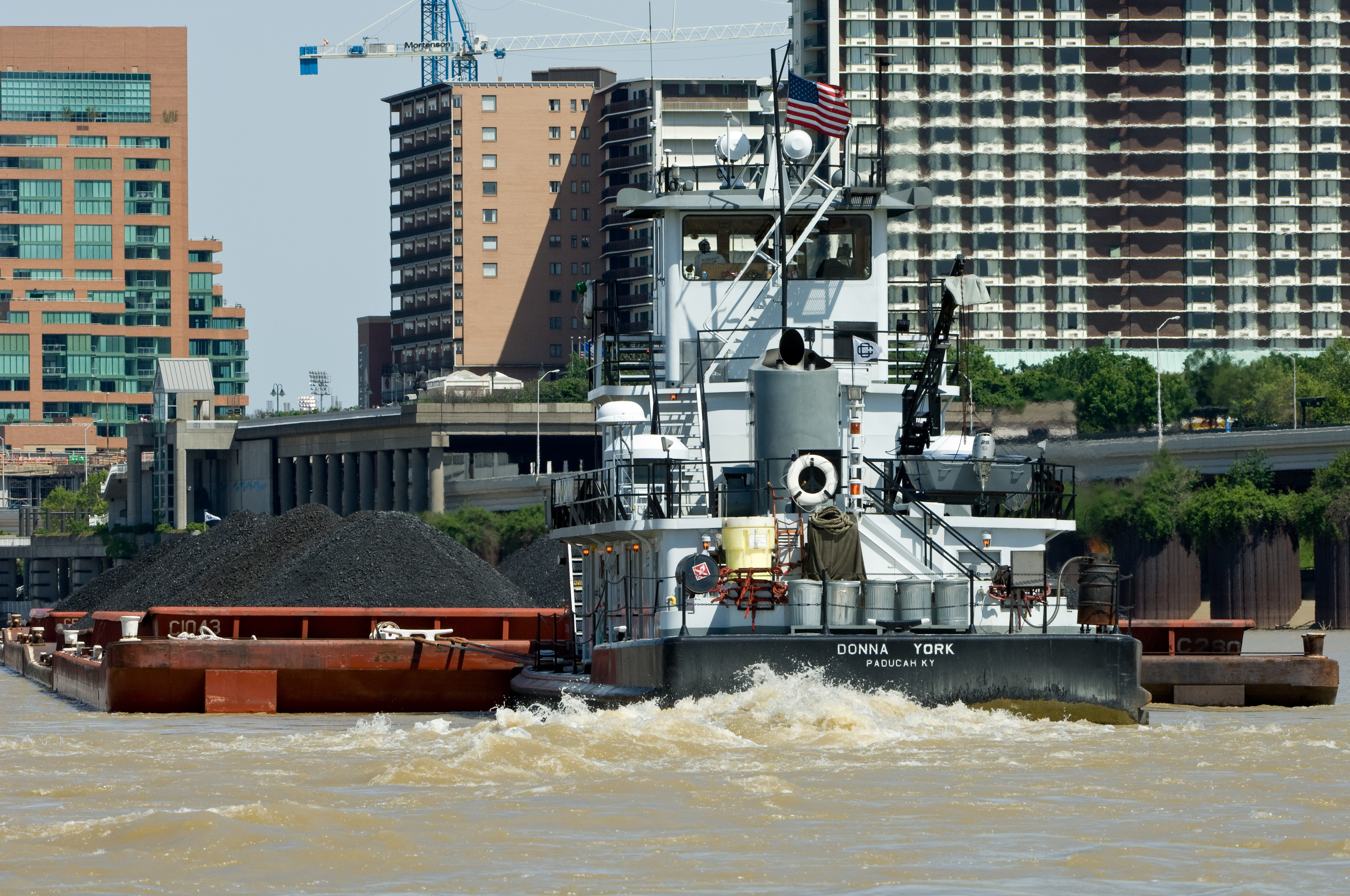
Towboat Donna York pushing barges of coal up the Ohio River at Louisville, Kentucky, United States

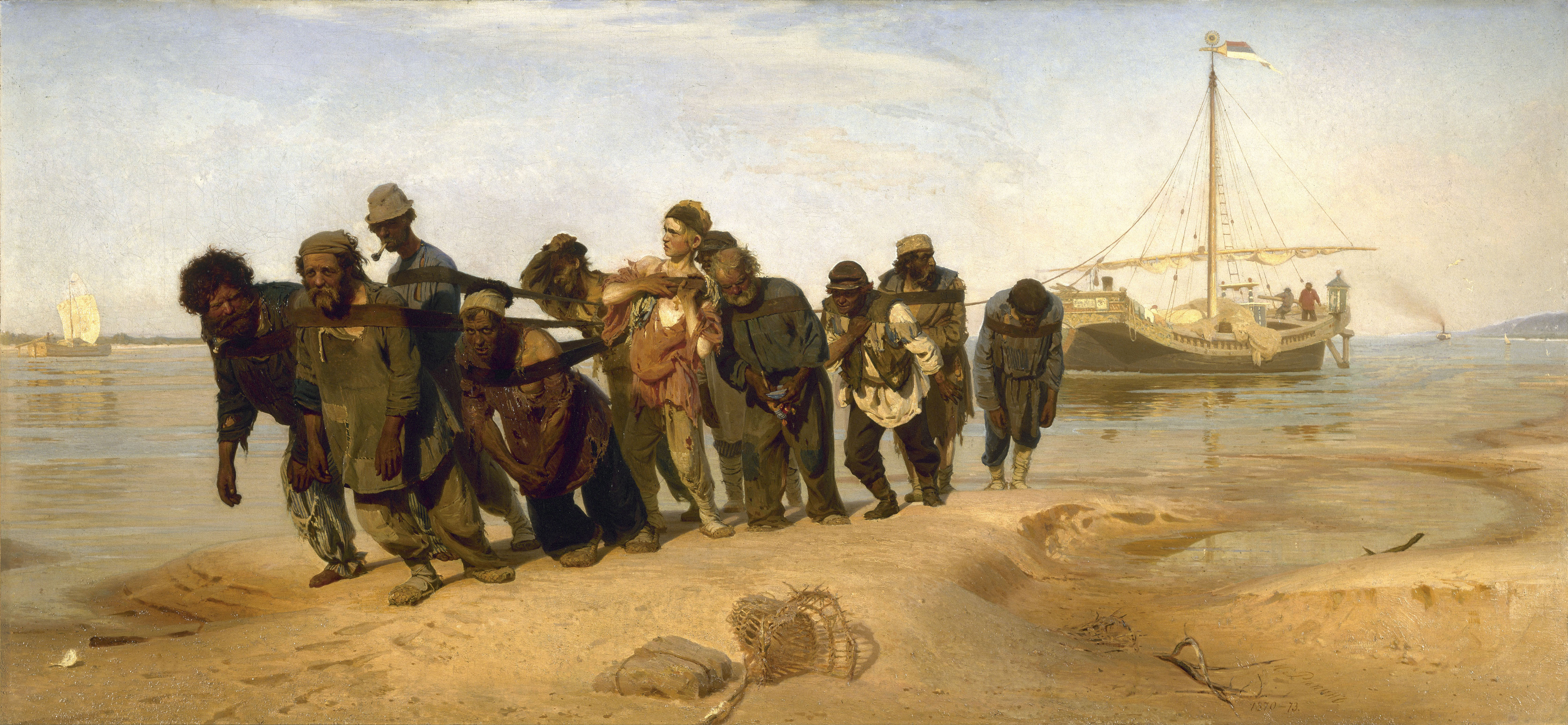
Barge Haulers on the Volga (1870–73), by Ilya Repin

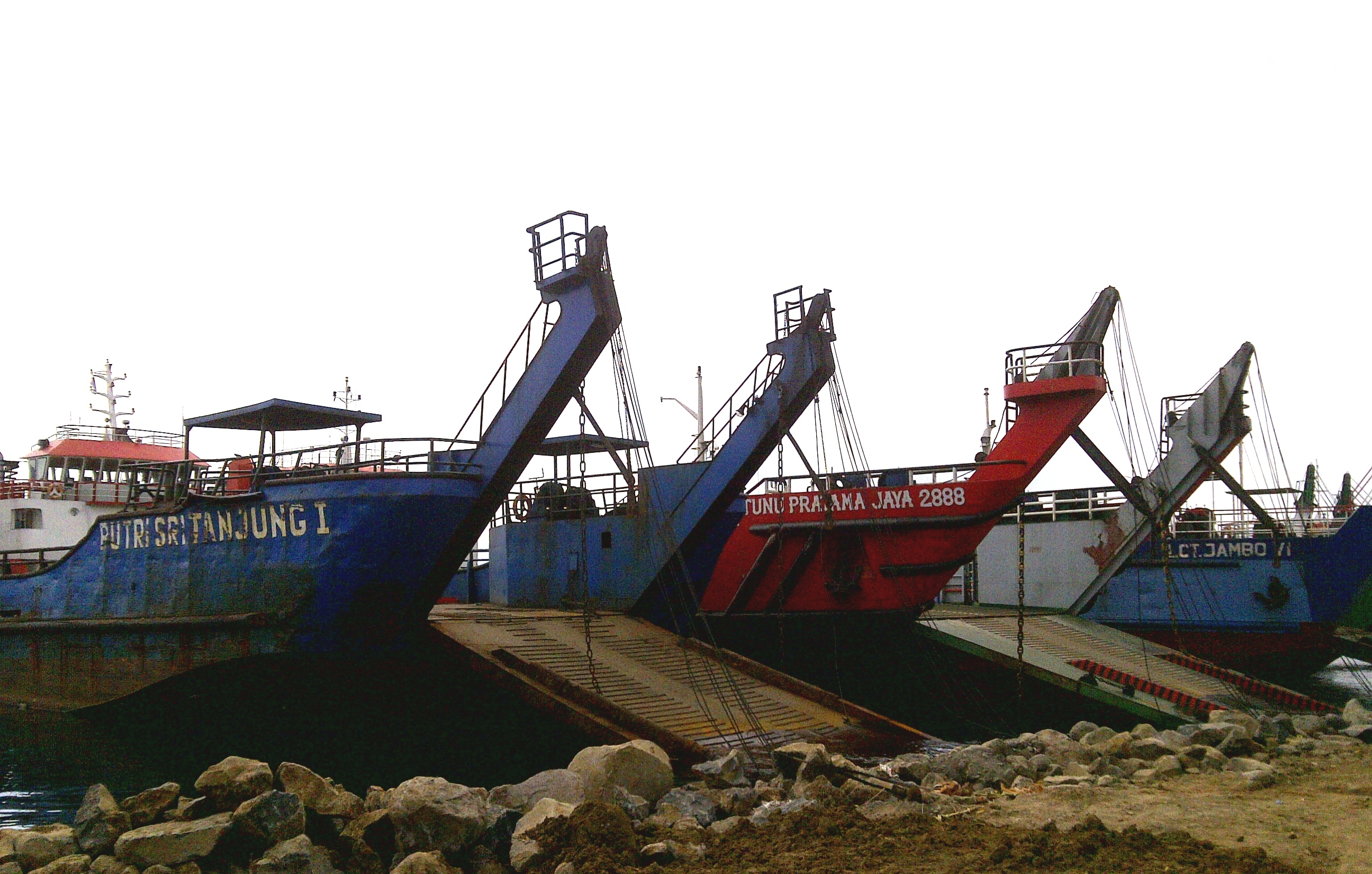
Tongkang or car barge, landed on Ketapang Port, Banyuwangi, Indonesia

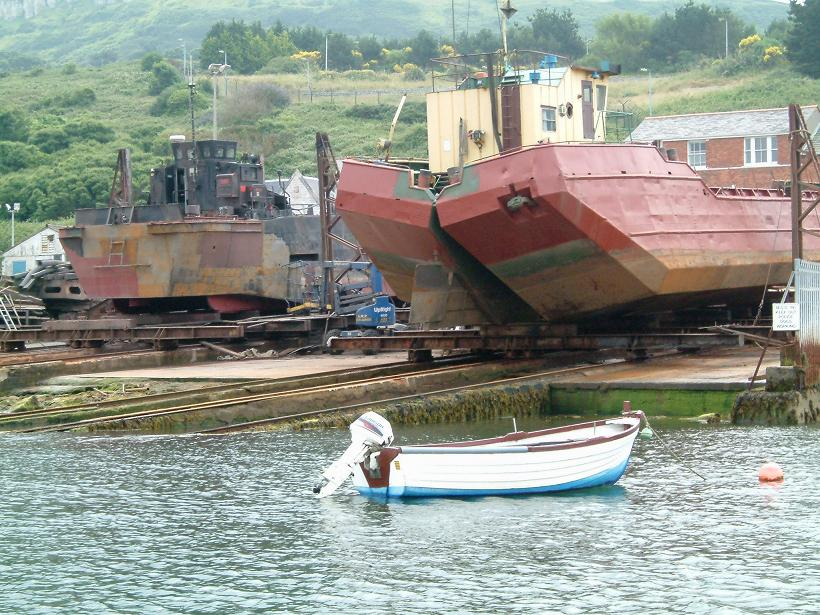
Slipway at Portland Harbour, Dorset, England, holding a split dump barge (on right)

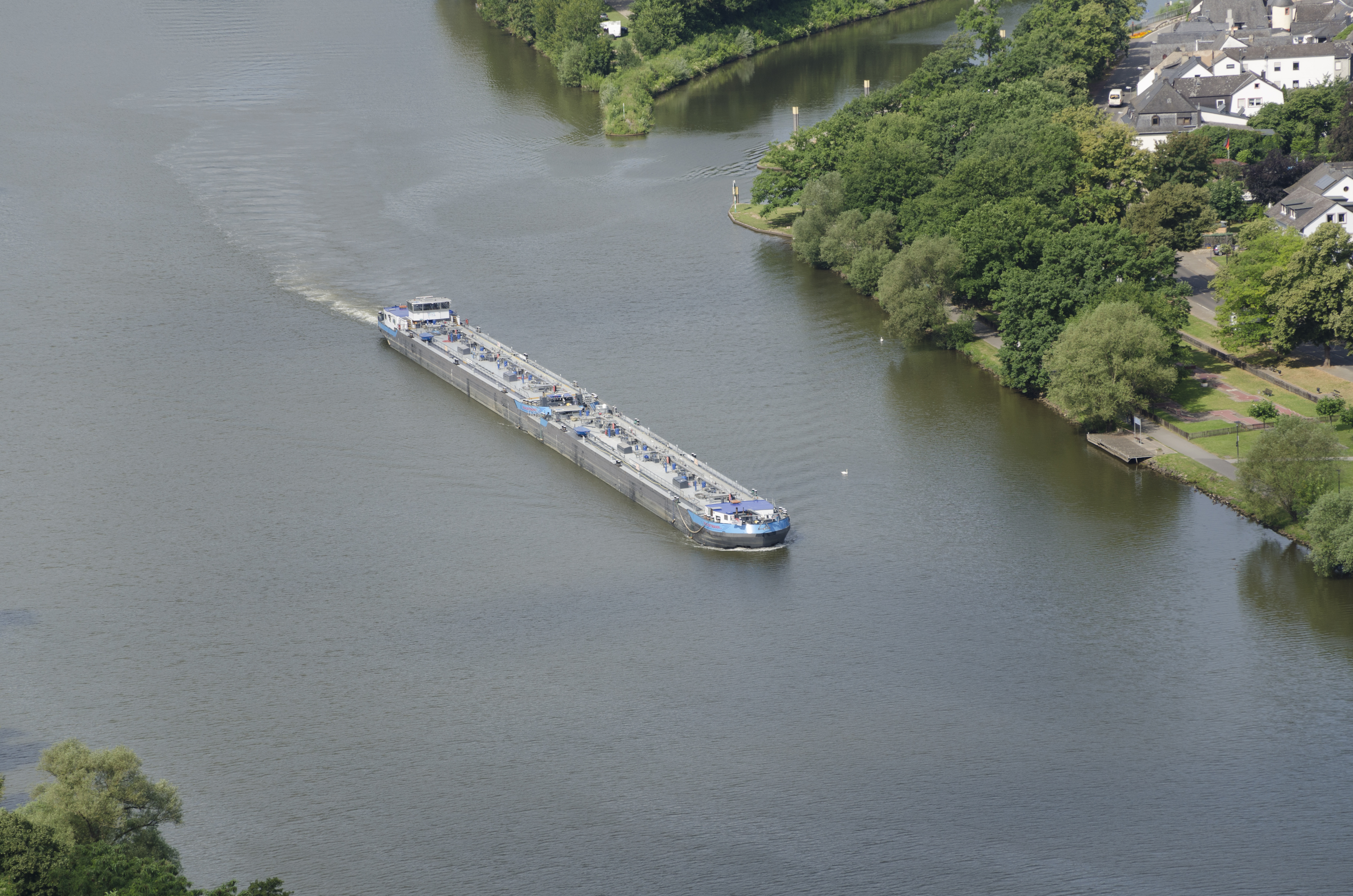
Barge on the river Mosel in Germany

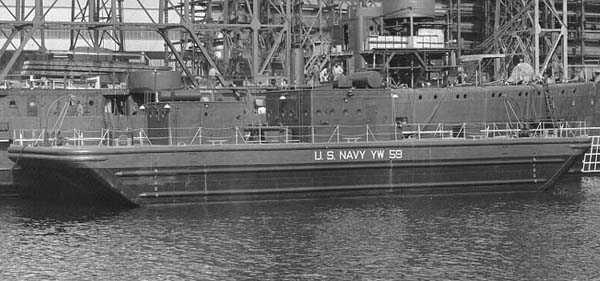
US Navy Water Type B ship Barge, YW-59, launched August 29, 1941

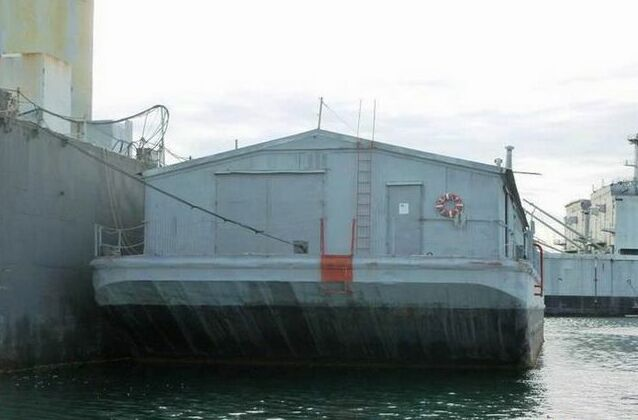
YFN-958 a covered lighter barge, non-self-propelled. Built by Mare Island Navy Shipyard in 1944.

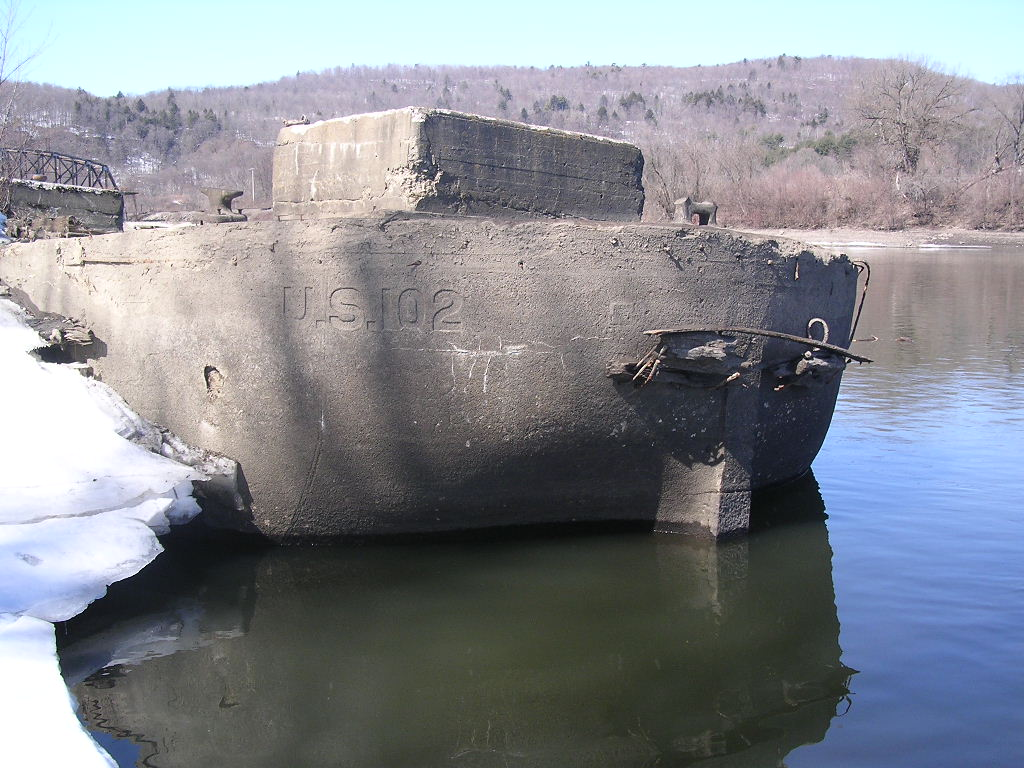
Ferrocement Barge, US-102, in the Erie Canal

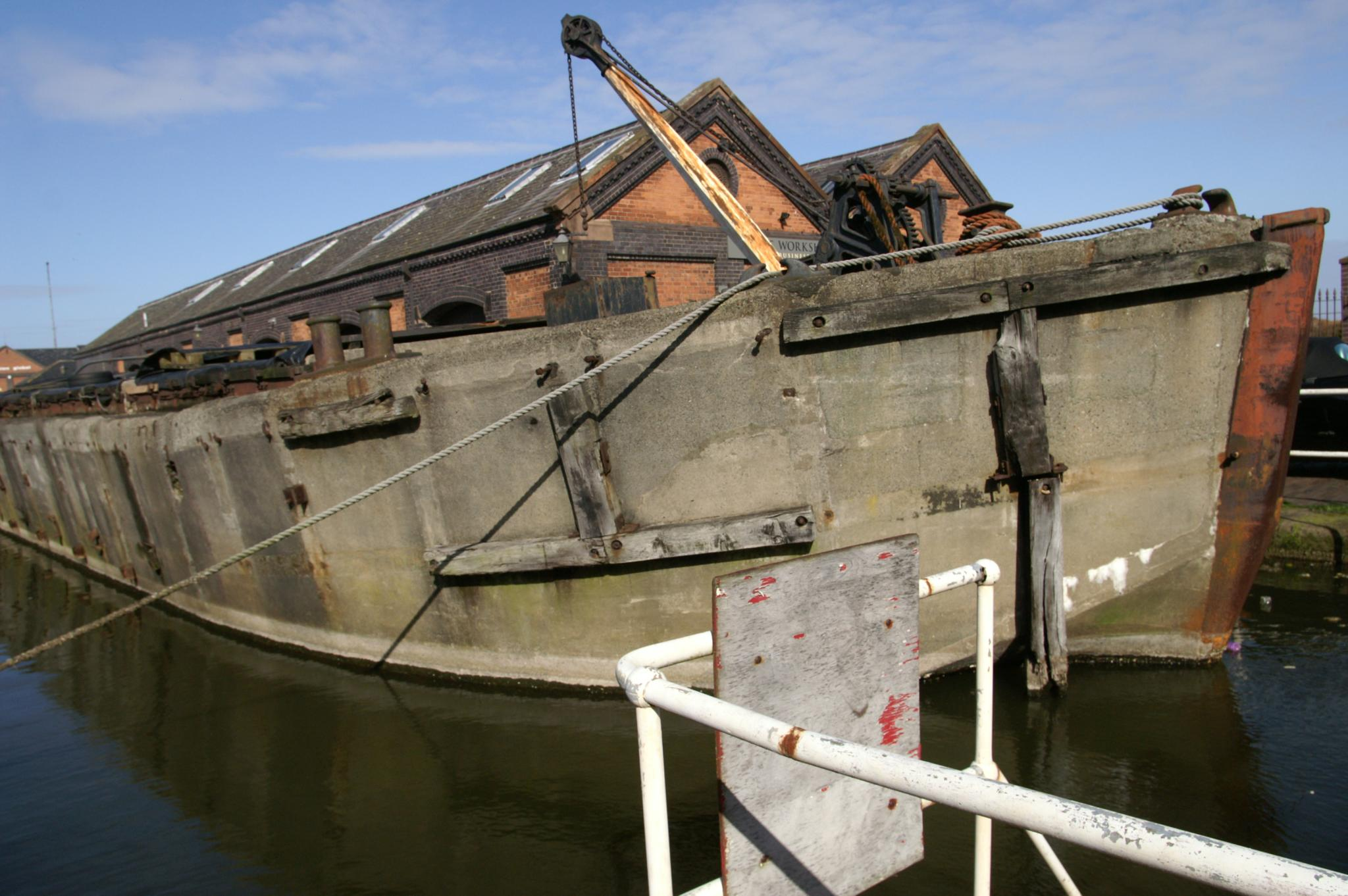
WW2 concrete barge at the National Waterways Museum, Ellesmere Port, Cheshire, UK

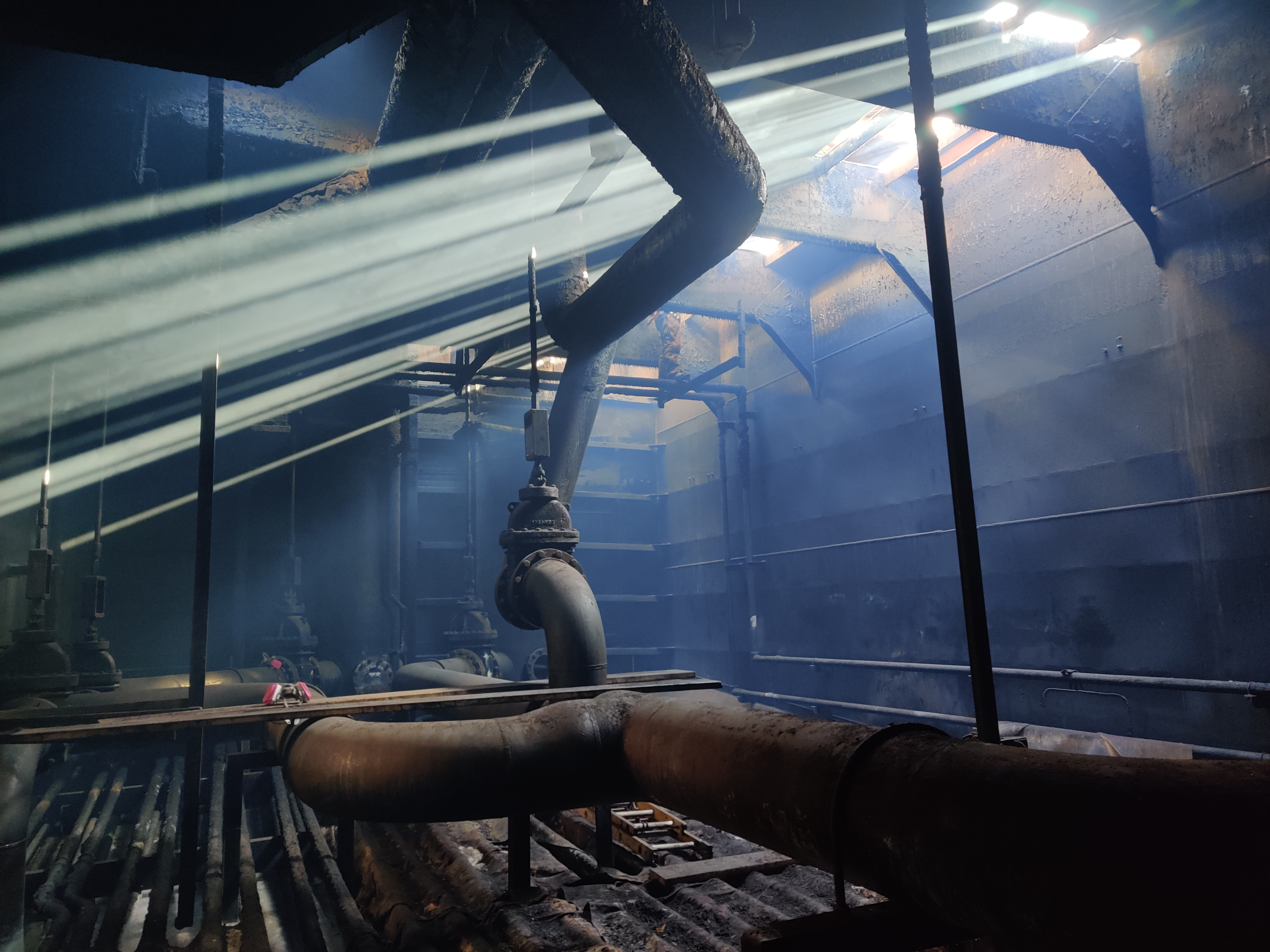
Sun shining into the empty asphalt barge Endeavour while under repair in Muskegon, Michigan

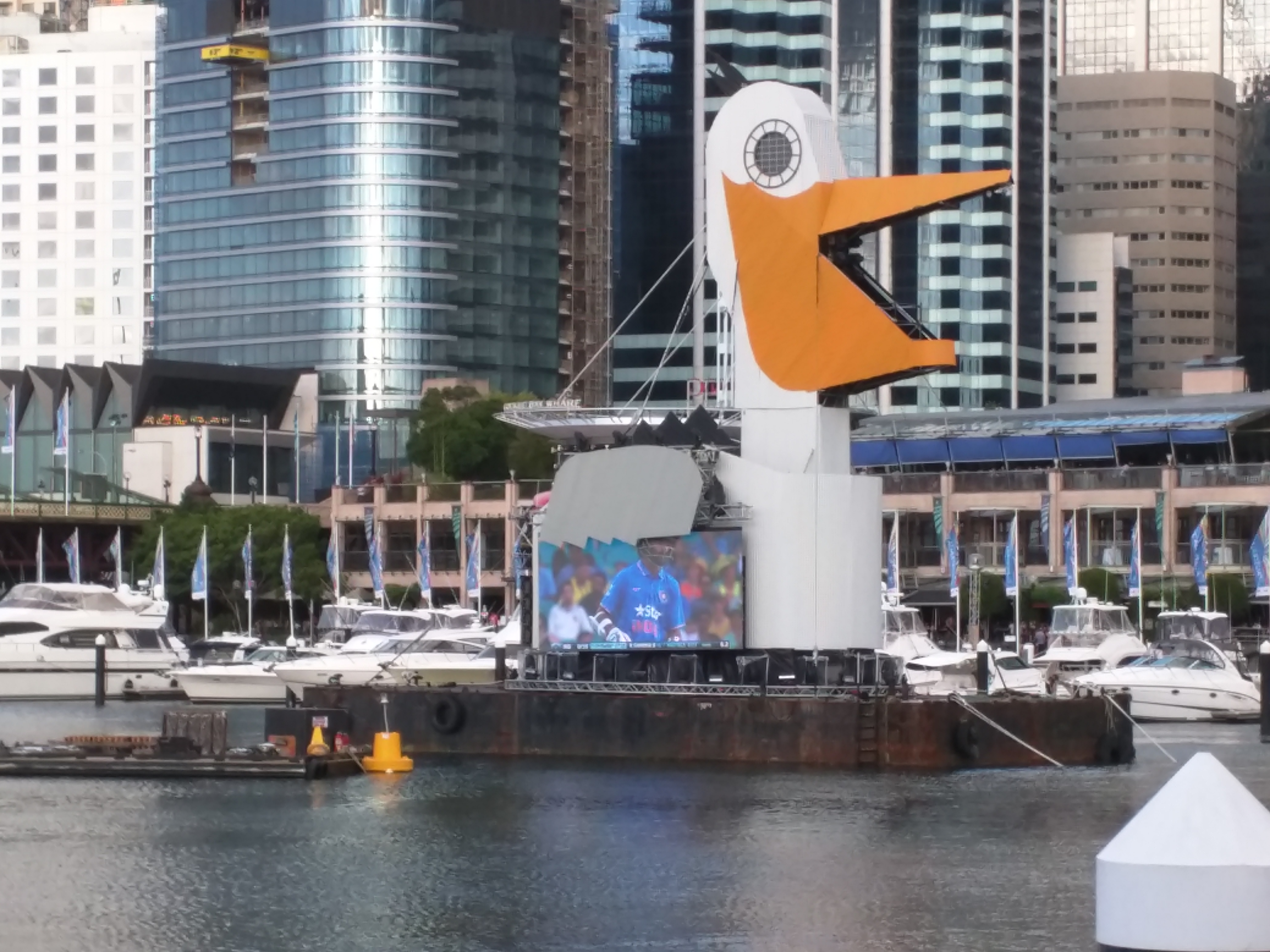
A barge decorated to look like a pelican carrying a jumbotron display, Sydney

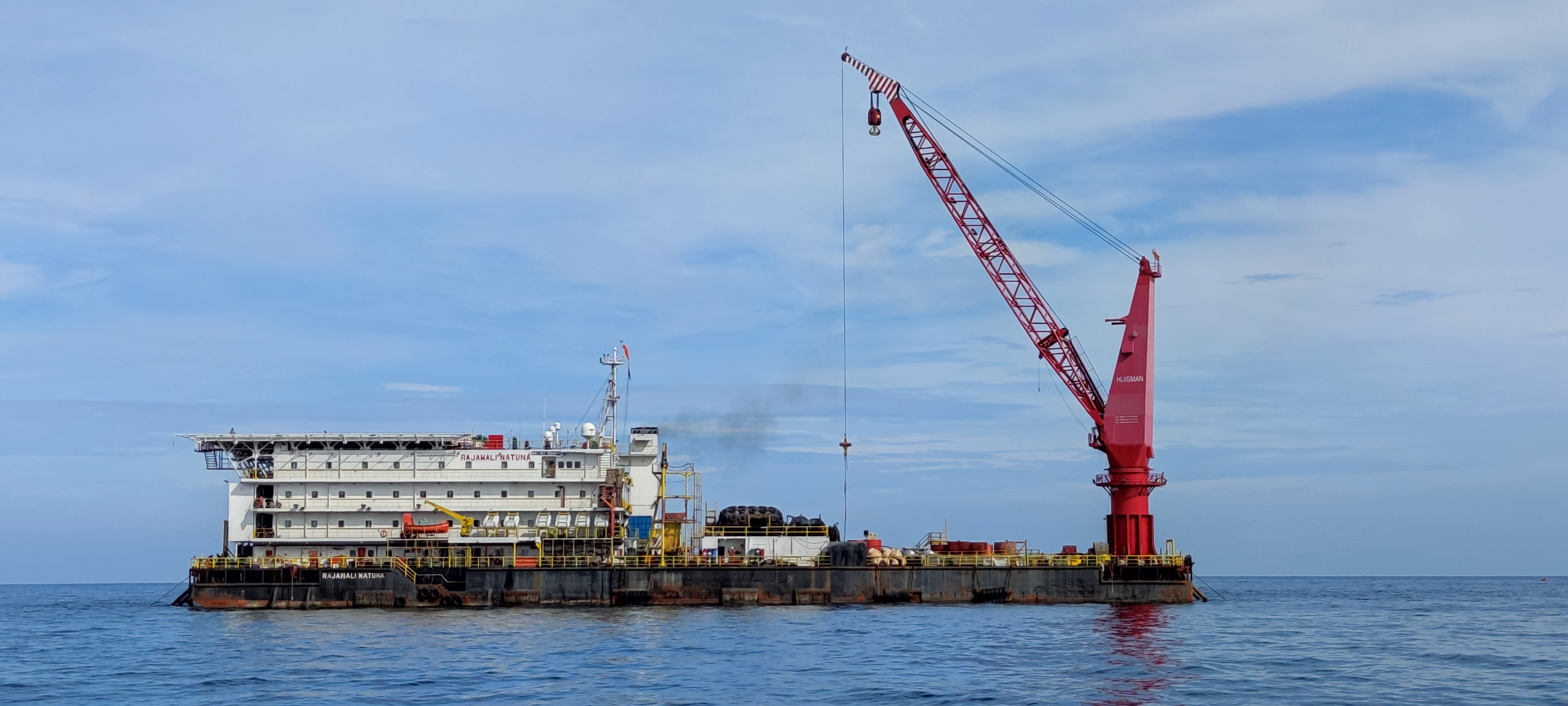
Accommodation Work Barge

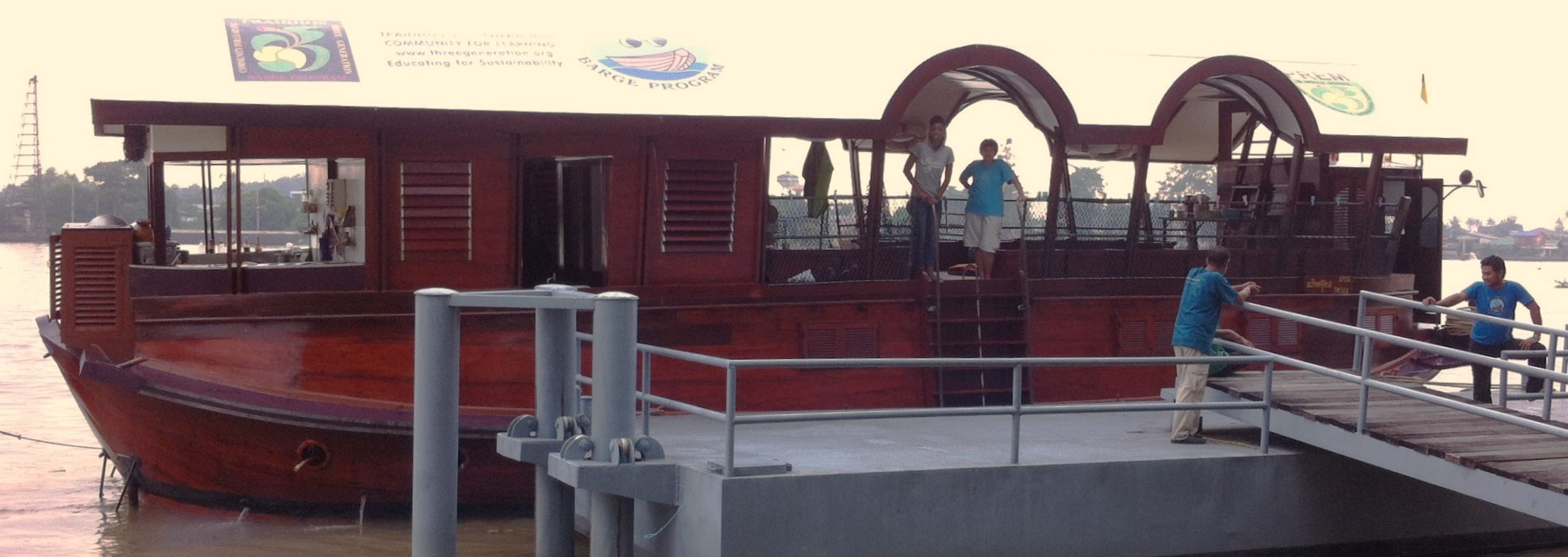
A restored teak barge used for educational programmes on the Chao Phraya river in Bangkok

== See also ==
- American Waterways Operators
- Burlak
- Canal boat Ross Barlow
- Container on barge
- Dory, another type of flat-bottomed boat
- Float (nautical)
- Hughes Mining Barge
- Mobro 4000
- Pusher and Tug boat, both used to move barges
  - Chain boat, which uses a chain for propulsion in its task of moving barges
