= List of the types of canal craft in the United Kingdom =

This is a list of the types of craft to be found on the canals and non-tidal rivers of the United Kingdom for which the Canal and River Trust have a licence category:

- Thames sailing barges,
- Barges
- Dutch barges
- Cabin cruisers
- Canoes and kayaks
- Mersey flat
- Narrowboats
- Stand-up paddleboard
- Open powered boats
- Rowing boats
- Sail boats
- Widebeams
