= List of cleft lip and palate organisations =

This is a list of cleft lip and palate organisations around the world.

== Canada ==
- Transforming Cleft
- AboutFace

== China ==
- Smile Angel Foundation

== United Kingdom ==
- Cleft Lip and Palate Association
- Facing the World

== United States ==
- Operation Smile
- ReSurge International
- Shriners Hospitals for Children
- Smile Train
- Smile Network International
- Alliance for Smiles

=== Colombia ===
- Premium Care Kids
