= Operation Smile =

American nonprofit medical organization

- Formation: 1982; 44 years ago
- Founders: William P. Magee Jr. Kathleen S. Magee
- Type: Nonprofit
- Headquarters: Virginia Beach, Virginia, U.S.
- CEO: William P. Magee Jr.
- President: Kathleen S. Magee
- Website: www.operationsmile.org

Operation Smile is a nonprofit medical service organization founded in 1982 by husband and wife William P. Magee Jr. and Kathleen (Kathy) S. Magee. It is headquartered in Virginia Beach, Virginia.

In addition to providing cleft lip and palate repair surgeries to children worldwide, Operation Smile works as a non-governmental organization to reduce the occurrence of cleft lips and palates worldwide.

Operation Smile has provided over 350,000 surgeries for children and young adults born with cleft lips, cleft palates, and other facial deformities in over 60 countries since 1982, at no cost to the recipients. As of 2022, Operation Smile provided on-going care around the world at 38 smile centers.

== Early history ==
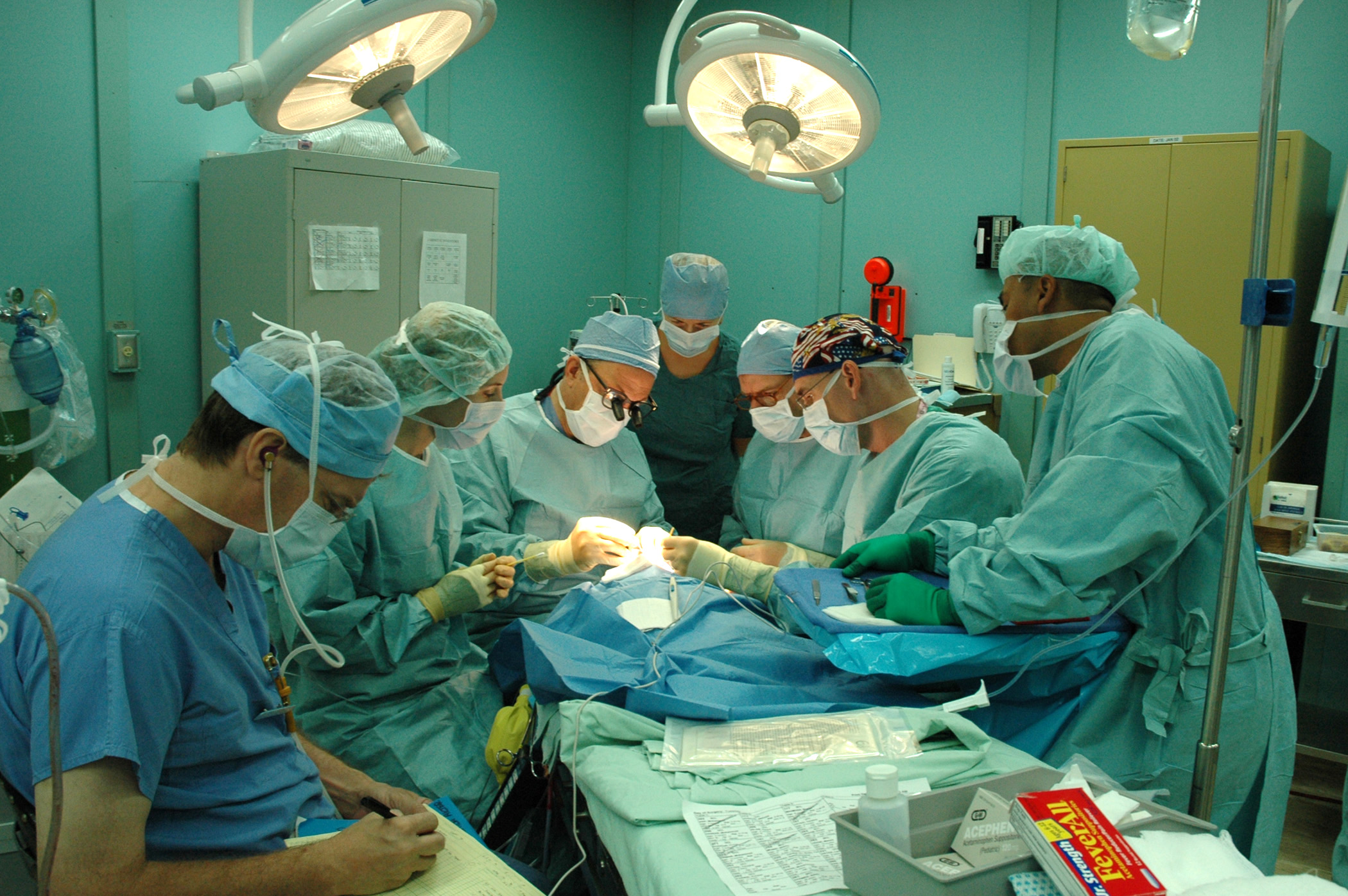
Chittagong, Bangladesh – Operation Smile team members aboard the Military Sealift Command (MSC) hospital ship USNS Mercy (T-AH-19) perform a cleft lip surgery

Operation Smile was founded by William (Bill) and Kathleen (Kathy) Magee. In 1982 Bill Magee, a plastic surgeon, and Kathy Magee, then a social worker and a nurse, were invited to join a Philippine cleft repair mission with a group of medical volunteers. When they realized that the group would not return to the Philippines though there were many remaining who needed surgery, they established Operation Smile, Bill Magee said,

It was guilt ... We saw hundreds of children and saw many more turned away. We knew that this group was not planning to return. So we planned another trip, but when we saw how many people were suffering because of their facial deformities, we had to keep on going back. You can't help but be touched by things that we take as completely normal and all of a sudden become a monumental event in a child's life.

The Magees completed two return trips to the city of Naga, treating 400 children. In 1995, Operation Smile opened its first care center in Duitama, Colombia. After establishing headquarters in Norfolk, VA, Operation Smile began foundations in Australia, the UK, Italy, Vietnam, and Ireland.

== Programs ==
=== Surgical missions ===
For each mission, Operation Smile verifies the credentials of participants and arranges travel for a team of volunteers. The team typically includes a mission site coordinator, plastic surgeons, anesthesiologists, a pediatrician, an intensive care physician, head or coordinating nurse, pre- and post-op nurses, child development specialists, and speech pathologists, as well as dentists and/or orthodontists.

Operation Smile has hosted two global summits on medical standards in Norfolk, Virginia.

In 2001 a documentary on the work done by Operation Smile won Best Medical Documentary at the US Circle of Excellence Media Awards and was a finalist in the New York Film Festival Awards for Best Humanitarian Documentary. The Facemakers: Operation Smile is a co-production by BBC One and the Discovery Channel in conjunction with Century Films.

== 1999-2002: Criticism and response ==
In November 1999, specific patient deaths brought criticism on Operation Smile's medical procedures. In response, Operation Smile conducted an internal review, whereupon the organization publicly acknowledged organizational flaws. The charity notified its chapters that it was enacting changes at the suggestion of an outside lawyer retained by the organization to review its conduct. The charity said it would step up efforts to hire a new chief executive and would add the position of chief medical officer. The charity also stated its intent to strengthen board supervision of volunteer medical staff.

== 2011 failed merger ==
In early 2011, Smile Train and Operation Smile announced the two charities would merge, followed three weeks later by announcements that the merger had been aborted.

In 2009, the Virginian Pilot outlined the history and differences between the two organizations in a publication.

Following the failed merger, Operation Smile "spun-off" the Operation Smile Foundation into Stop Cleft International, a 501(c)(3) organization. Stop Cleft International became a subsidiary of Smile Train in July 2013. Operation Smile paid an agreed upon obligation of $4,000,000 to Stop Cleft International/Smile Train during the 2013 tax year.

== Financial information ==
- In 2011, Forbes ranked Operation Smile as the tenth "least efficient" large U.S. charity, tied with the Alzheimer's Association and just ahead in efficiency of the American Cancer Society. Forbes noted that "financial efficiency is far from the whole story when it comes to assessing a charity's vitality or even effectiveness."
- Operation Smile spends 42% of the money donated to the charity on fundraising and administration, including a salary of $350,000 (and an additional $27,915 in other compensation) for its chief executive.
- The organization was listed with the Forbes 2005 200 Largest U.S. Charities.
- Operation Smile is a member of the Independent Charities of America.
- Operation Smile meets 19 of the 20 standards for charities established by the Better Business Bureau Wise Giving Alliance, but fails to meet the "Compensated Board Members" standard, because two of the eleven board members (the husband and wife co-founders) are compensated directly or indirectly, which exceeds the standard's limit of 10%.

== In popular culture ==
- A 2007 multimedia project featured a seven-story sphere at South Street Seaport in New York, NY.
- Actress Roma Downey has been an ambassador for the Virginia-based nonprofit Operation Smile for 20 years.
- Singer Mariah Carey volunteered for The Smile Collection fundraising event in New York in 2006.
- Operation Smile is referenced repeatedly on Bravo's teen reality show NYC Prep.
- In 2016, Kate Hudson accepted the Universal Smile Award for her long time support with Operation Smile.

=== Co-branding ===
- In 2002, Operation Smile was featured in a Mr. Potato Head contest, with proceeds to benefit the NGO. Hasbro donated Mr. Potato Head toys for Operation Smile missions.
- Operation Smile has had co-branding campaigns with Sephora and AriZona Iced Tea.
- In February 2018, Operation Smile partnered with Lay’s potato chips.
- In March 2024, Operation Smile partnered with Mr. Beast to create a video on his YouTube channel Beast Philanthropy, to educate about cleft lip and palate and about the work of Operation Smile itself.
- In May 2025, Operation Smile Houston and Los Angeles partnered with Balmain for a fundraiser.

== Headquarters relocation ==
In 2007, Operation Smile announced relocation of its headquarters from Norfolk, Virginia to a new building in Virginia Beach.

== See also ==
- Make A Child Smile – American children's charity website
- Cleft lip and palate organisations
- Oral and maxillofacial surgery
