= Mercy-class hospital ship =

Hospital ship class in use with the United States Navy

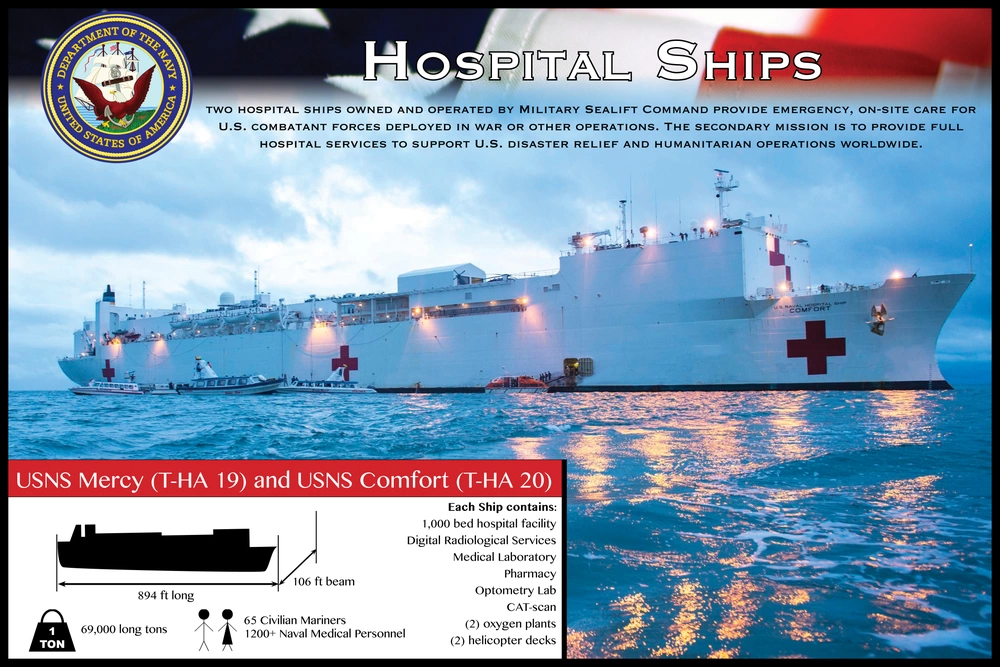

Class overview
- Name: Mercy class
- Builders: National Steel and Shipbuilding Company
- Operators: United States Navy
- Preceded by: Haven class
- Built: 1974–1976 as San Clemente-class oil tankers
- In commission: 1986–present
- Completed: 2
- Active: 2

General characteristics
- Type: Hospital ship
- Displacement: 69,360 long tons (70,473 t)
- Length: 894 ft (272 m)
- Beam: 105 ft 7 in (32.18 m)
- Propulsion: Two boilers, two GE turbines, one shaft, 24,500 hp (18 MW)
- Speed: 17.5 knots (32.4 km/h; 20.1 mph)
- Complement: 12 civilian and 58 military during Reduced Operating Status; 61 civilian and 1,214 military during Full Operating Status
- Time to activate: 76 hours
- Armament: Multiple crew served machine gun mounts; Small arms
- Aviation facilities: Helicopter landing deck

The Mercy class of hospital ships are converted San Clemente-class supertankers used by the United States Navy. Originally built in the 1970s by the National Steel and Shipbuilding Company, they were acquired by the Navy and converted into hospital ships, coming into service in 1986 and 1987.

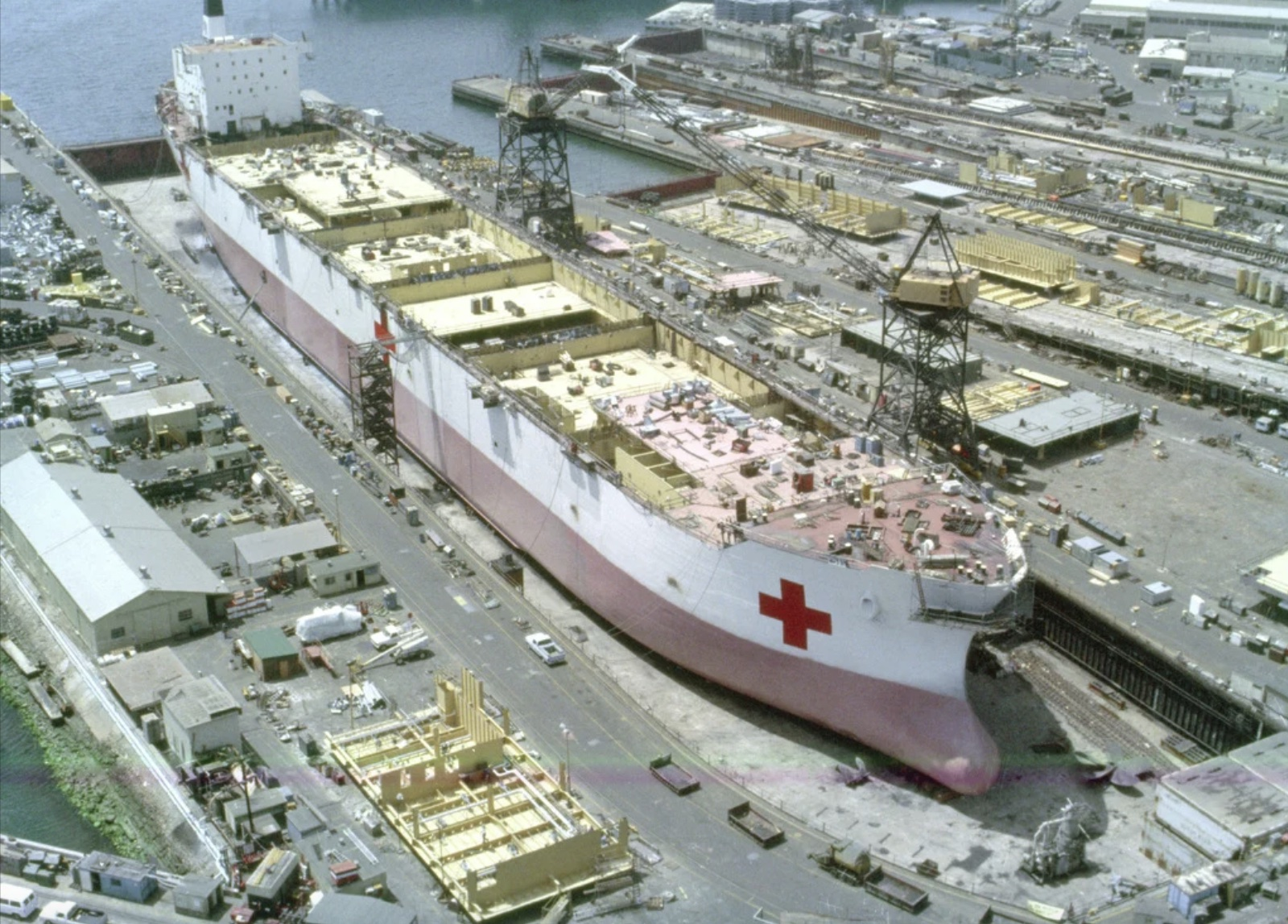
The oil tanker SS Worth being converted by NASSCO to become USNS Mercy

Mercy class replaced the Haven-class hospital ships.

The ships are operated by Military Sealift Command and are designed to provide emergency, on-site care for American combatant forces, and also for use in support of disaster relief and humanitarian operations. Each ship contains twelve fully equipped operating rooms, a 1,000-bed hospital facility, radiological services, a medical laboratory, pharmacy, optometry lab, CT scan equipment, and two oxygen-producing plants.

== Ships ==
Two ships of the class were put into service:

- USNS Mercy (T-AH-19) (ex SS Worth)
- USNS Comfort (T-AH-20) (ex SS Rose City)

Both ships are visually distinguishable by the red cross painted on the superstructure. The cross is centered on Comfort, and offset to port on Mercy.

== Missions ==
Stationed in San Diego, California, Mercy primarily operates in the Pacific and Indian Oceans. Her inaugural mission in 1987, was a humanitarian cruise to the Philippines and South Pacific. Her first military mission was serving coalition troops in the First Gulf War. The first disaster relief came in the wake of the 2004 tsunami as Operation Unified Assistance. Her latest was in 2013, when she came to the aid of the Philippines, and other nations in the aftermath of Typhoon Haiyan.

Stationed out of Norfolk, Virginia, Comfort operates primarily in the Caribbean and Latin America. Her first mission was a combat one: serving coalition troops off the coast of Kuwait, during Operation Desert Storm. Her first humanitarian missions both happened in 1994, helping Haitian and Cuban immigrants looking to come to America. In the aftermath of September 11 attacks, Comfort was activated and sent to Manhattan, to provide medical and mental health services. Comfort headed into combat again for Operation Iraqi Freedom. In 2005, she was back saving American citizens following the devastation of Hurricane Katrina. In 2010, she undertook another disaster relief mission, in response to an earthquake in Haiti. In May 2015, Comfort was in Kingston, Jamaica. Once again in 2017, Comfort was deployed to aid American citizens in Puerto Rico after Hurricane Maria.

In March 2020, the ships were deployed to aid in the fight against the coronavirus pandemic. Both ships were to function as trauma centers at erstwhile-disused cruise ship terminals in San Pedro and Manhattan. This, at that time, would have been expected to have enabled nearby hospitals to have freed up beds for coronavirus patients. On 21 April, Governor Cuomo told President Trump that Comfort was no longer needed in New York. While docked in the city, she treated 182 patients.

== Criticism ==
USNS Mercy in 2012

The Mercy-class ships' size gives them a substantial radar signature that, combined with lack of maneuverability, makes them vulnerable to attack. In theory, this should never occur, as attacking a hospital ship is a war crime under the Hague Convention of 1907, but the ships are vulnerable to entities that do not recognize this established warfare convention; both ships are outfitted only with defensive weapons. In a battle fleet (with troop ships, landing ships and helicopter carriers) they could be hit inadvertently by stray missiles; their radar signature is not unique from combatant ships.

In mid-2004 Vice Admiral Michael L. Cowan, the Surgeon General and chief of the Bureau of Medicine and Surgery, said that Comfort and Mercy should be retired and that "They're wonderful ships, but they're dinosaurs. They were designed in the '70s, built in the '80s, and frankly, they're obsolete."

== See also ==
- Hospital ship
- List of United States Navy hospital ships
- Chinese hospital ship Daishan Dao
- MV Global Mercy, a civilan hospital ship run by the international charity NGO Mercy Ships
