= USNS Comfort =

Hospital ship of the United States Navy

USNS Comfort (T-AH-20)
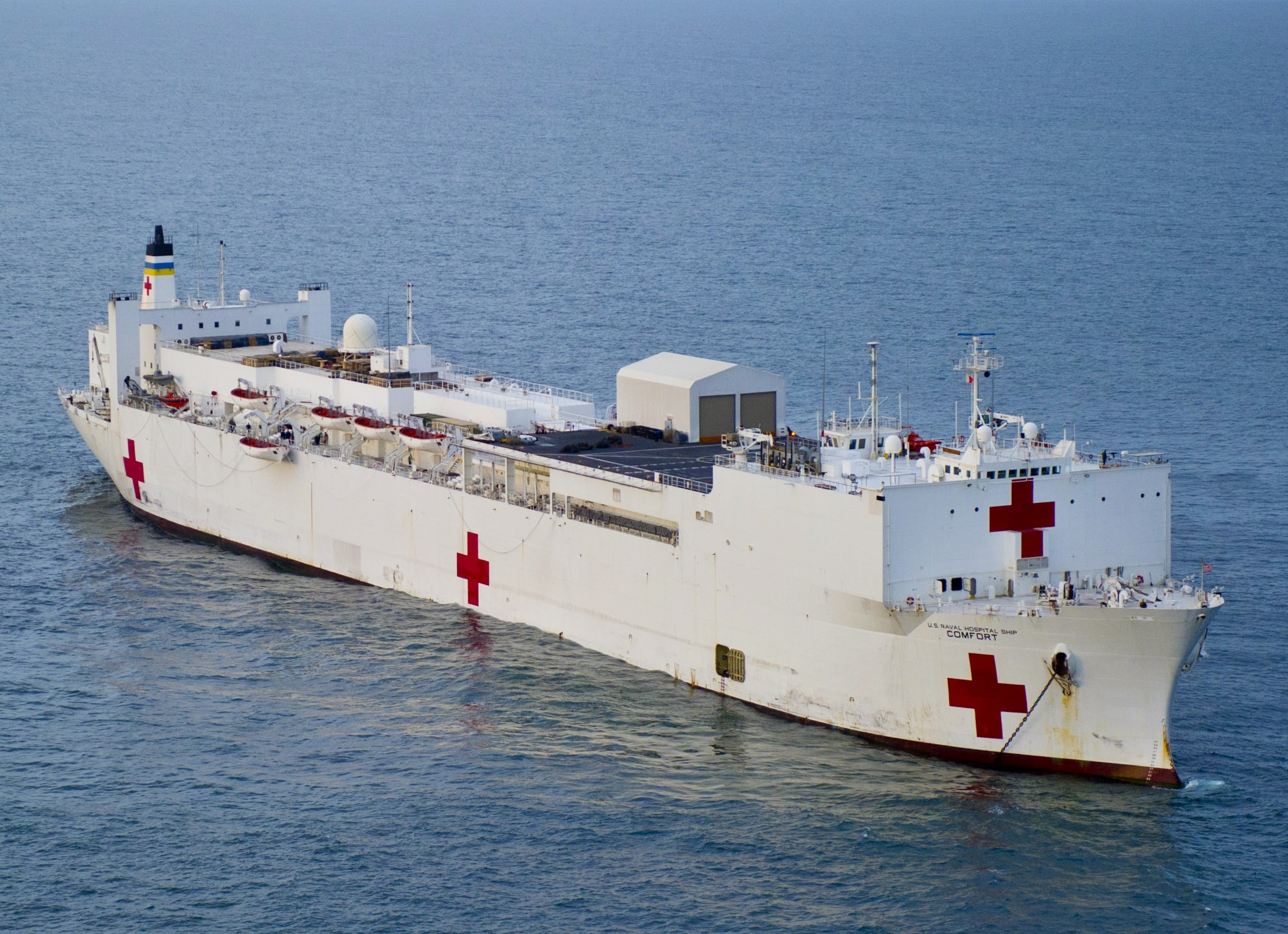
- USNS Comfort in Trinidad and Tobago waters in September 2019

History

United States
- Name: 1975–1987: Rose City; 1987–present: Comfort
- Builder: National Steel & Shipbuilding
- Laid down: 1 May 1975 (as Rose City MA-301)
- Launched: 1 February 1976
- In service: 1 December 1987 (with the U.S. Navy)
- Home port: Naval Station Norfolk
- Identification: Callsign: NCOM; IMO number: 7390478; MMSI number: 368817000
- Motto: Curare Aegra Permarinum (Care of the Sick on the Sea)
- Status: Active
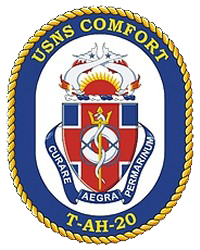
- Badge

General characteristics
- Class & type: Mercy-class hospital ship
- Displacement: 69,360 tons (70,470 t)
- Length: 894 ft (272 m)
- Beam: 105 ft 7 in (32.18 m)
- Draft: 33 ft (10 m)
- Propulsion: Two boilers, two GE turbines, one shaft, 24,500 hp (18.3 MW)
- Speed: 17.5 knots (20.1 mph; 32.4 km/h)
- Capacity: 1,000 patient beds
- Complement: 63 civilian, 956 naval hospital staff, 258 naval support staff
- Time to activate: 5 days
- Aviation facilities: A flight deck that can handle military helicopters (CH-53D, CH-53E, MH-53E, Mi-17, UH 60)

USNS Comfort (T-AH-20) is a Mercy-class hospital ship of the United States Navy.

Comfort's duties include providing emergency, on-site care for U.S. combatant forces deployed in war or other operations. Operated by the Military Sealift Command, Comfort provides rapid, flexible, and mobile medical and surgical services to support Marine Corps Air-Ground Task Forces and Army and Air Force units deployed ashore, and naval amphibious task forces and battle forces afloat. Secondarily, she provides mobile surgical hospital service for use by appropriate U.S. government agencies in disaster or humanitarian relief or limited humanitarian care incident to these missions or peacetime military operations. Comfort is more advanced than a field hospital but less capable than a traditional hospital on land.

From 30 March to 30 April 2020, Comfort was stationed in New York City to help combat the city's coronavirus pandemic by treating non-coronavirus, and later on, coronavirus-positive patients. She had been stationed there previously following the attacks of 9/11 in 2001, to bolster the city's civilian medical services in the aftermath.

== Complement ==
The USNS prefix identifies Comfort as a non-commissioned ship owned by the U.S. Navy and operationally crewed by civilians from the Military Sealift Command (MSC). A uniformed naval hospital staff and naval support staff is embarked when the Comfort is deployed, consisting primarily of naval officers from the Navy's Medical Corps, Dental Corps, Medical Service Corps, Nurse Corps, and Chaplain Corps, and naval enlisted personnel from the Hospital Corpsman rating and various administrative and technical support ratings (e.g., Yeoman, Personnel Specialist, Information Systems Technician, Religious Program Specialist, etc.).

In accordance with the Geneva Conventions, Comfort and her crew carry no offensive weapons, aside from an armed Special Agent Afloat from NCIS. Firing upon Comfort would be considered a war crime as the ship only carries weapons for self-defense. In keeping with her status as a non-combatant vessel, naval personnel from the combat specialties are not assigned as regular crew or staff. Underway embarks by Navy Unrestricted Line officers (e.g., warfare qualified combat specialties), enlisted Naval Aviation, Surface Warfare, Submarine Warfare, Special Operations or Special Warfare/SEAL personnel, or any Marine Corps officers or enlisted personnel, are typically limited to official visits, helicopter or tilt-rotor flight operations or as patients.

== Construction and conversion ==
Like her sister ship USNS Mercy, Comfort was built as a San Clemente-class oil tanker in 1976 by National Steel & Shipbuilding in San Diego as the Rose City. She is the third United States Navy ship to bear the name Comfort, and the second Mercy-class hospital ship. Her career as an oil tanker ended when she was delivered to the United States Navy on 1 December 1987.

After a quarter-century in Baltimore, Maryland, Comfort changed her homeport to Naval Station Norfolk in Norfolk, Virginia, in March 2013. The move placed the ship closer to supplies, much of which come from Naval Medical Center Portsmouth, and to medical crew. Savings to the U.S. Navy are estimated at $2 million per year.

== Deployments ==
=== Persian Gulf War (1990–91) ===
During the Gulf War, Comfort received a call to activate for Desert Shield/Desert Storm 9 August 1990 and left Baltimore on 11 August. Comfort took station just off the coast of Saudi Arabia near Khafji and Kuwait. On 12 March 1991, Comfort headed home, arriving in Baltimore on 15 April 1991. She had traveled more than 30,000 nautical miles (35,000 mi; 56,000 km) and consumed almost 3 million U.S. gallons (2,500,000 imp gal; 11,000,000 L) of fuel. More than 8,000 outpatients were seen, and 700 inpatients were admitted, including four sailors injured in a high-pressure steam leak on USS Iwo Jima. 337 surgical procedures were performed. Other notable benchmarks include: more than 2,100 safe helicopter activities; 7,000 prescriptions filled; 17,000 laboratory tests completed; 1,600 eyeglasses made; 800,000 meals served and 1,340 radiographic studies, including 141 CT scans.

=== Operation Sea Signal (1994) ===
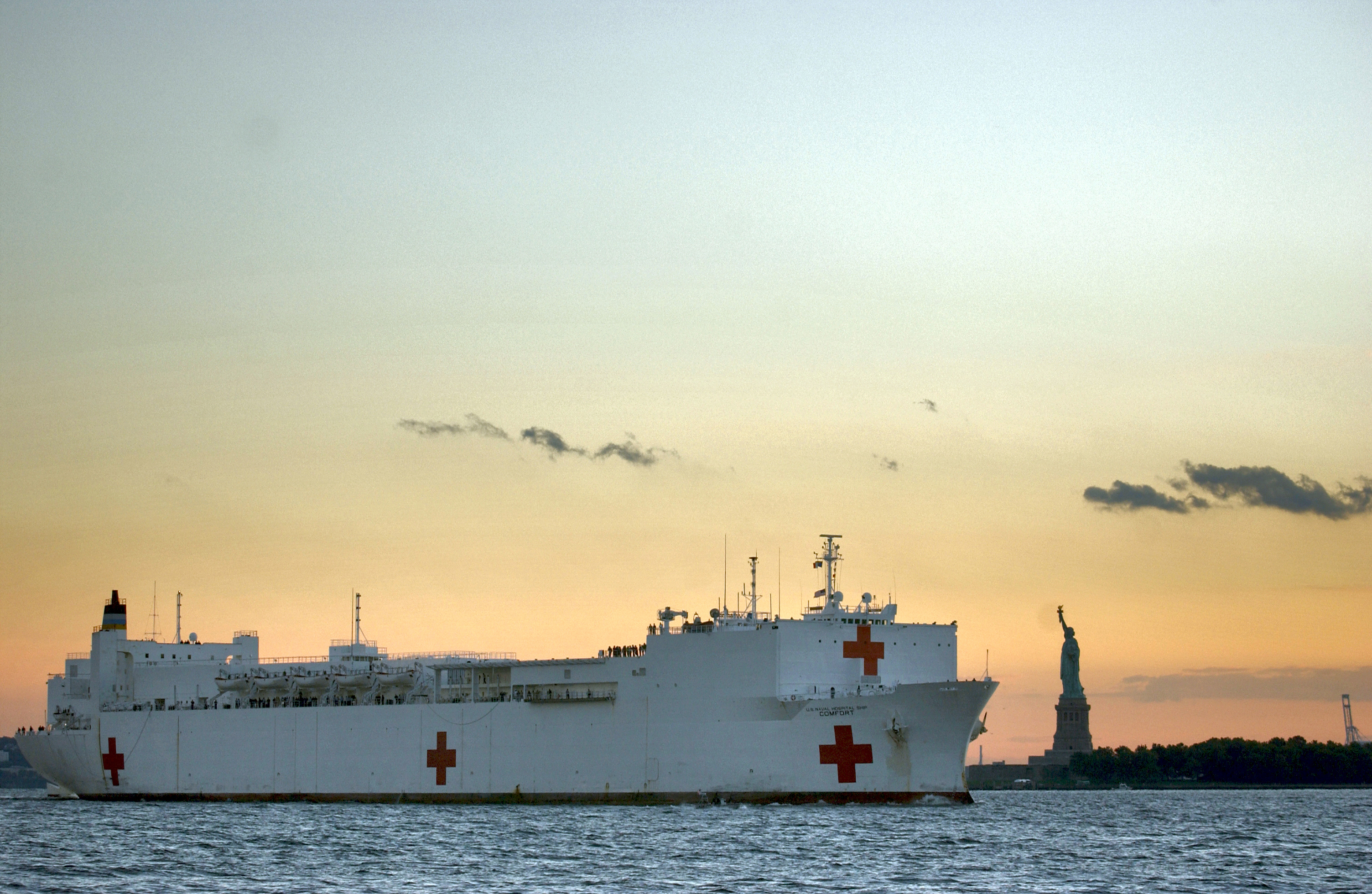
The USNS Comfort passes the Statue of Liberty en route to Manhattan to provide assistance to victims of the September 11 attacks on the World Trade Center.

In 1994, Comfort was ordered to serve as a processing center for Haitian migrants, the first ship to act as such a center. She set out for the Caribbean with 928 military and civilian personnel from various federal government and international agencies. On 16 June 1994 the first Haitian migrants were taken aboard. Over the months, her population swelled to 1,100. Shortly thereafter, Comfort sailed for Guantanamo Bay Naval Base, Cuba, to drop off the remaining 400 migrants.

=== Operation Uphold Democracy (1994) ===
On 2 September 1994, Comfort was directed to activate for an unprecedented second deployment in a year. Comfort was tasked to provide a 250-bed medically intensive patient capability for the 35,000 Cuban and Haitian migrants supported by Naval Station Guantanamo Bay, Cuba. Comfort departed Naval Base Norfolk, Virginia, with a specially configured crew of 566 personnel. Following the diplomatic agreement reached between the United States and Haiti, Comfort took up a position off Port-au-Prince ready to receive casualties that might result from the transfer of U.S. and allied forces ashore. From 16 September through 2 October 1994, Comfort personnel provided both medical and surgical support to U.S. and allied forces ashore and afloat, emergency humanitarian care to injured Haitian citizens, and participated in various aspects of the Civil Affairs Program in an effort to aid the rebuilding effort of the local healthcare system. She returned to Norfolk on 14 October 1994.

=== Operation Noble Eagle (2001) ===
Comfort was activated the afternoon of 11 September 2001, in response to the terrorist attack on the World Trade Center and sailed the next afternoon to serve as a 250-bed hospital facility at Pier 92 in midtown Manhattan. The ship arrived at Pier 92 in Manhattan about 8:30 p.m. 14 September. That evening a small number of relief workers arrived aboard the ship. As word about the ship spread, more workers began arriving over the next few days. The ship's clinic saw 561 guests for cuts, respiratory ailments, fractures, and other minor injuries, and Comfort's team of Navy psychology personnel provided 500 mental health consultations to relief workers. Comfort also hosted a group of volunteer New York area massage therapists who gave 1,359 therapeutic medical massages to ship guests.

=== Iraq War (2002–03) ===
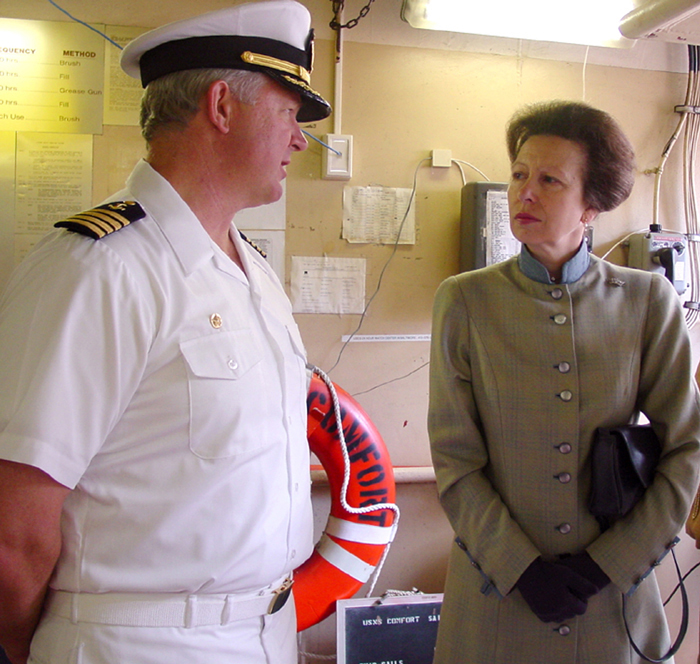
Capt. Dean Bradford, master of Comfort, greets Princess Anne on 11 July 2002 while the ship was docked in Southampton, England

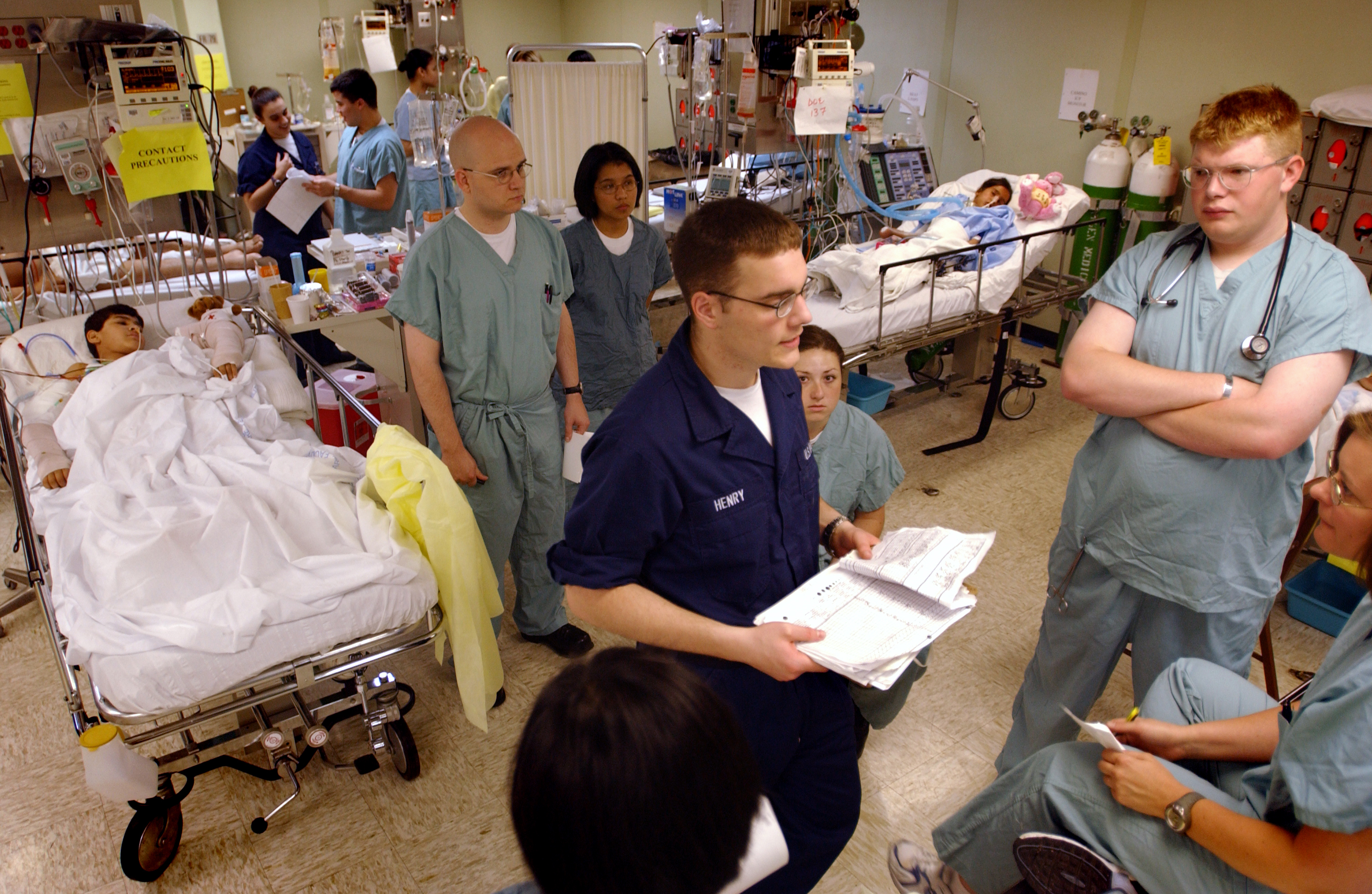
Intensive care unit (ICU) aboard Comfort in 2003

Comfort was ordered to activate on 26 December 2002, and set sail for the United States Central Command area of operations on 6 January 2003. After stopping in Diego Garcia to embark additional medical personnel flown in from the National Naval Medical Center, the ship proceeded to the Persian Gulf to serve as an afloat trauma center in support of Operation Iraqi Freedom. Comfort remained in the Persian Gulf for 56 days providing expert medical care to wounded U.S. military personnel as well as injured Iraqi civilians and enemy prisoners of war. When Comfort returned to Baltimore on 12 June 2003, it marked the completion of a nearly six-month activation. During this time, the ship conducted more than 800 helicopter deck landings to bring aboard personnel, patients, and cargo. Comfort's Medical Treatment Facility had also performed 590 surgical procedures, transfused more than 600 units of blood, developed more than 8,000 radiographic images, and treated nearly 700 patients, including almost 200 Iraqi civilians and enemy prisoners of war.

=== Hurricane Katrina (2005) ===
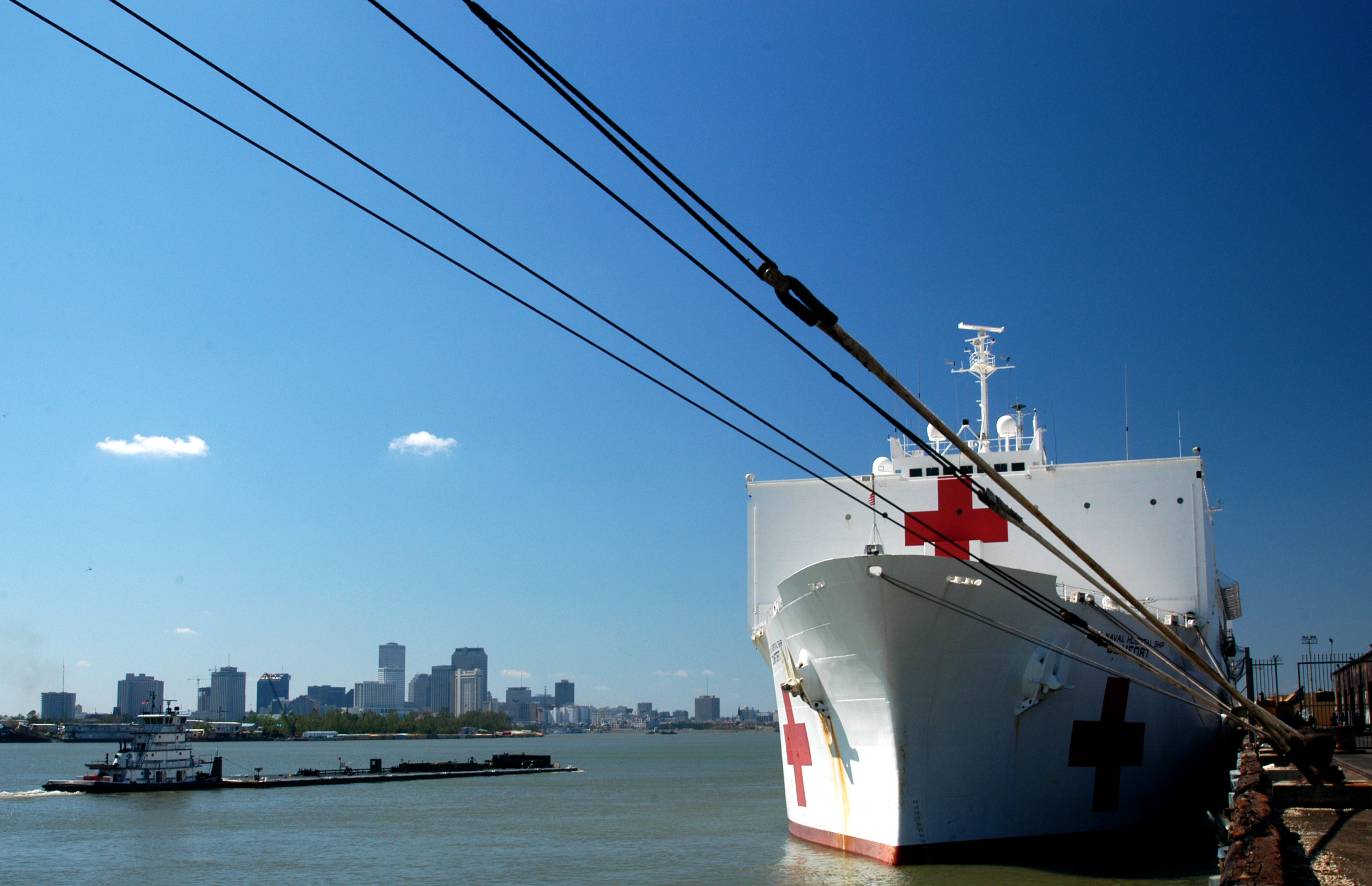
USNS Comfort in New Orleans after Hurricane Katrina

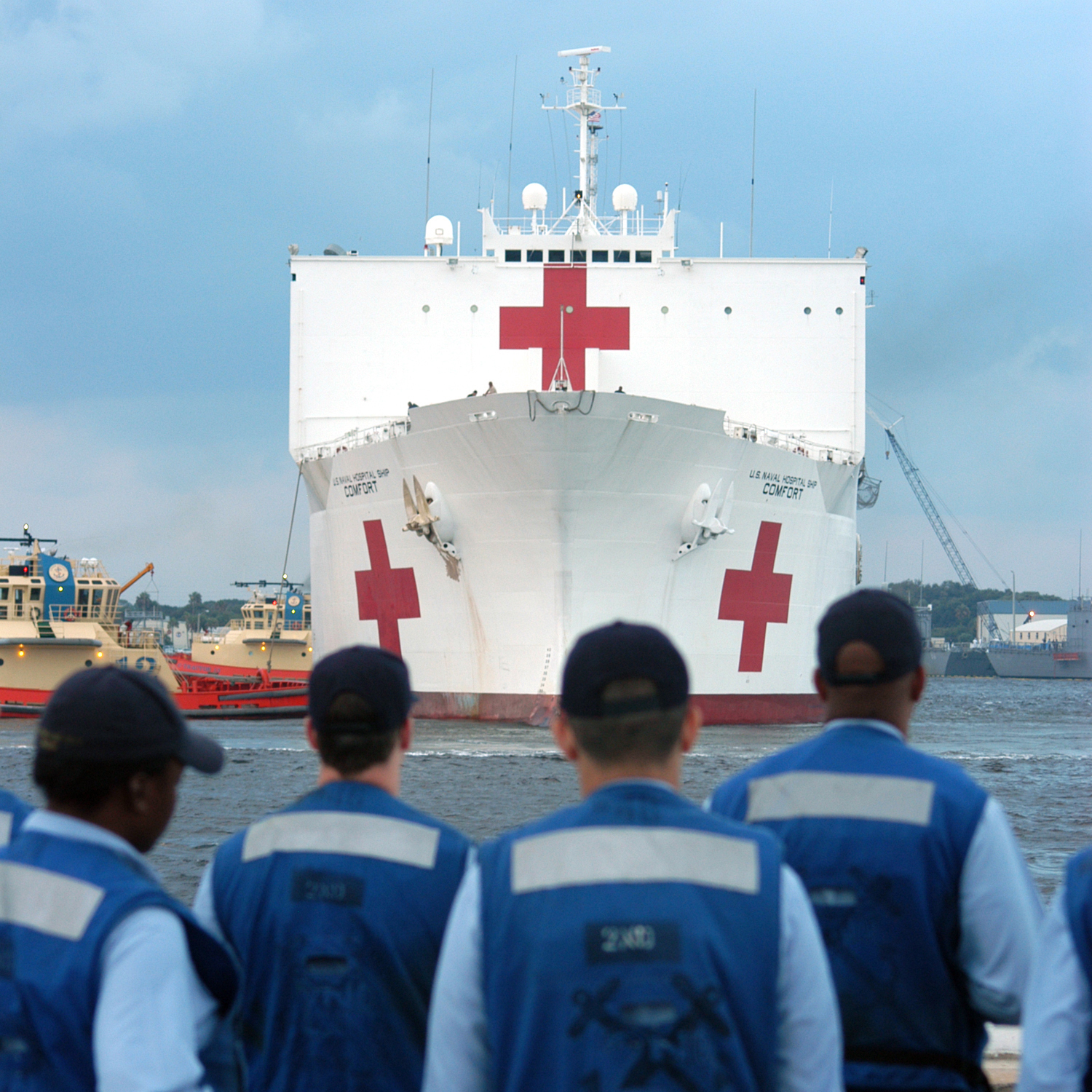
USNS Comfort takes on supplies at Mayport, Florida en route to the Gulf Coast for victims of Hurricane Katrina

Comfort deployed on 2 September 2005, after only a two-day preparation, to assist in Gulf Coast recovery efforts after the devastation of Hurricane Katrina. Starting in Pascagoula, Mississippi and then sailing to New Orleans, Comfort personnel saw 1,956 patients total. She returned on 13 October 2005 after a seven week deployment.

=== Partnership for the Americas (2007) ===
Comfort's Partnership for the Americas humanitarian mission, which began on 15 June 2007, was a major component of the President's "Advancing the Cause of Social Justice in the Western Hemisphere" initiative. Comfort visited 12 Central American, South American, and Caribbean nations where her embarked medical crew provided free health care services to communities in need. The missions objective was to offer valuable training to U.S. military personnel while promoting U.S. goodwill in the region. In all, the civilian and military medical team treated more than 98,000 patients, provided 386,000 patient encounters and performed 1,100 surgeries. The embarked medical crew was made up of more than 500 military and non-governmental organization (Project Hope and Operation Smile) doctors, nurses, and healthcare professionals. Their primary focus was to support medical humanitarian assistance efforts ashore. A secondary mission was outpatient shipboard health service support. Also supporting Comfort's medical mission was a SEABEE detachment from the East Coast-based Mobile Construction Battalion Maintenance Unit 202, which performed civic action repair and minor construction projects in the host countries. Also on the deployment was the U.S. Navy Showband from Norfolk, Virginia, which performed in each port.

Comfort was operated and navigated by a crew of 68 civil service mariners (CIVMARS) from the U.S. Navy's Military Sealift Command (MSC). This mission incorporated various non-government organizations and government agencies, such as Operation Smile, Project Hope, LDS Humanitarian Services, the Atlanta Rotary Club, U.S. Air Force, U.S. Coast Guard, U.S. Army, U.S. Health and Human Services and the Canadian Armed Forces. Patient encounters included a single patient receiving multiple treatments, students in training sessions, and even veterinary care services. Dentists and staff treated 25,000 patients, extracting 300 teeth, and performing 4,000 fillings, 7,000 sealings, and 20,000 fluoride applications. In addition to treating patients, bio-medical professionals fixed about a thousand pieces of medical equipment at local health facilities. The ship's crew also delivered nearly $200,000 worth of donated humanitarian aid.

=== Operation Unified Response (2010) ===
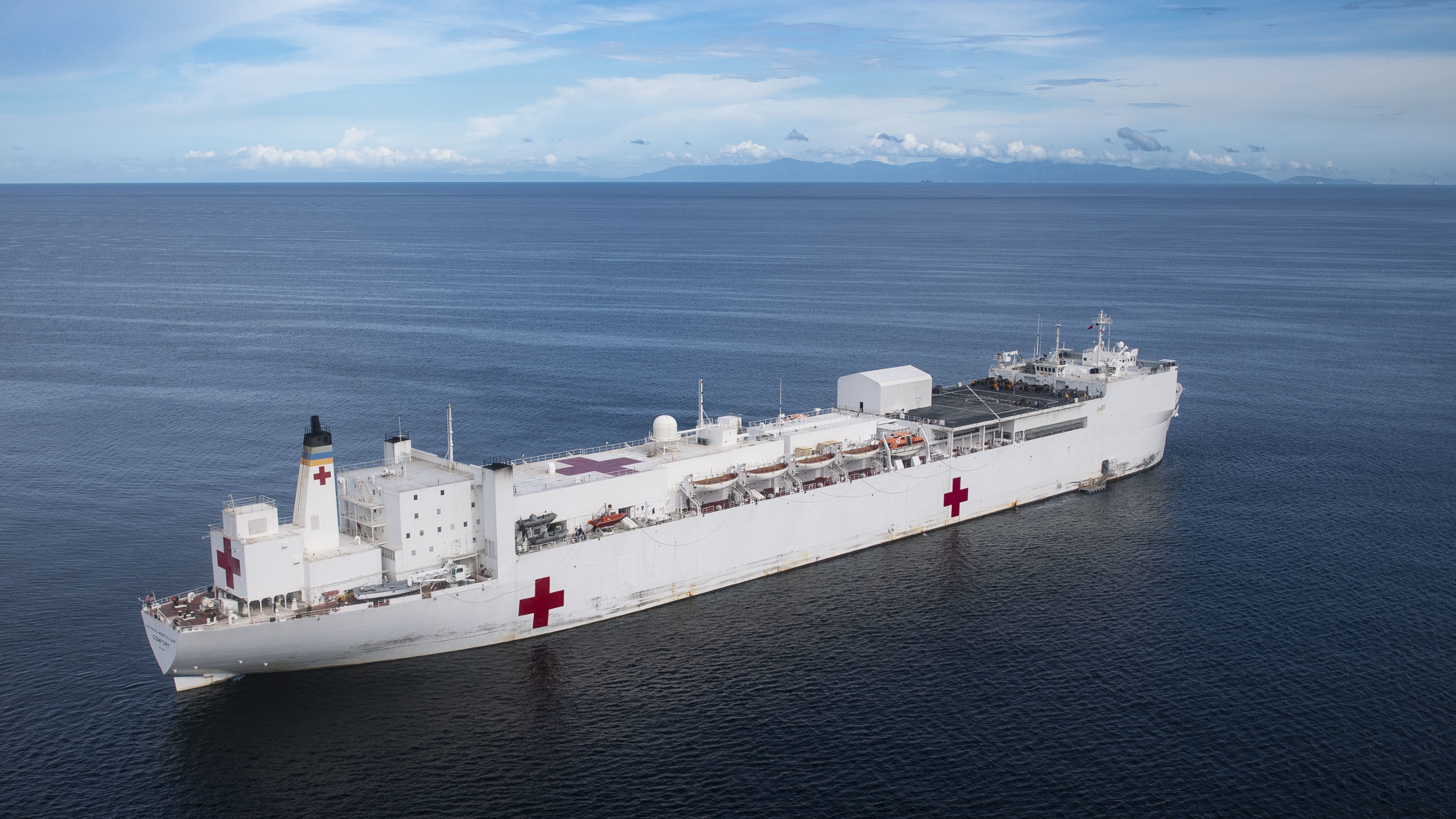
USNS Comfort in Trinidad and Tobago waters

On 13 January 2010, Comfort was ordered to assist in the humanitarian relief efforts following the 2010 Haiti earthquake as part of Operation Unified Response. Three days later on 16 January Comfort left the Port of Baltimore bound for Haiti. She arrived Wednesday, 20 January 2010 and began medical treatment early that day. The deployment marks the first time the ship has reached full operational capacity, utilizing all 12 operating rooms and 1,000 beds, since she was delivered to the Navy in 1987. The mission also saw the ship's first on-board delivery, of a 4-pound, 5-ounce premature baby named Esther. Although the ship is less capable than a traditional hospital on land, she offered the most advanced medical care available in Haiti following the earthquake. Between 19 January and 28 February 2010 the ship's staff treated 1,000 Haitian patients and performed 850 surgeries. By 8 March 2010, Comfort had discharged the last patient. On 10 March 2010, the ship ended her mission in the Joint Task Force Haiti area as part of Operation Unified Response, and returned to her home port.

=== Operation Continuing Promise (2011) ===
In 2011, the ship deployed on Operation Continuing Promise. The ship deployed for five months providing medical and surgical services to nine locations in the Caribbean and Latin America – Jamaica, Peru, Ecuador, Colombia, El Salvador, Nicaragua, Guatemala, Costa Rica, and Haiti. The ship's crew set up medical and surgical civil action program sites. These temporary medical clinics included primary care, internal medicine, obstetrics, and pediatric physicians as well as optometry, physical therapy, dental, radiology, laboratory, and pharmacy services. On board the ship general surgery, ophthalmology, oral and maxillofacial, and orthopedic surgeries were performed on pre-screened patients.

The mission included a Navy SeaBee (Construction Battalion) Unit, a navy helo squadron, the United States Navy Band and a Navy Security Force unit. US Army veterinarians and veterinary technicians, US Air Force biomedical repair technicians, and dentists and dental technicians from the Canadian Navy also participated.

Although it was primarily a medical/humanitarian mission, several programs and projects, commonly referred to as Community Relations (COMREL) projects were also provided to the local populace throughout the mission. Veterinarians worked with local farmers on pest control and vaccinations, SeaBees completed building improvements in local schools and other facilities, Navy Band was a staple in all programs involving US military personnel and local government officials.

=== Hurricane Maria (2017) ===
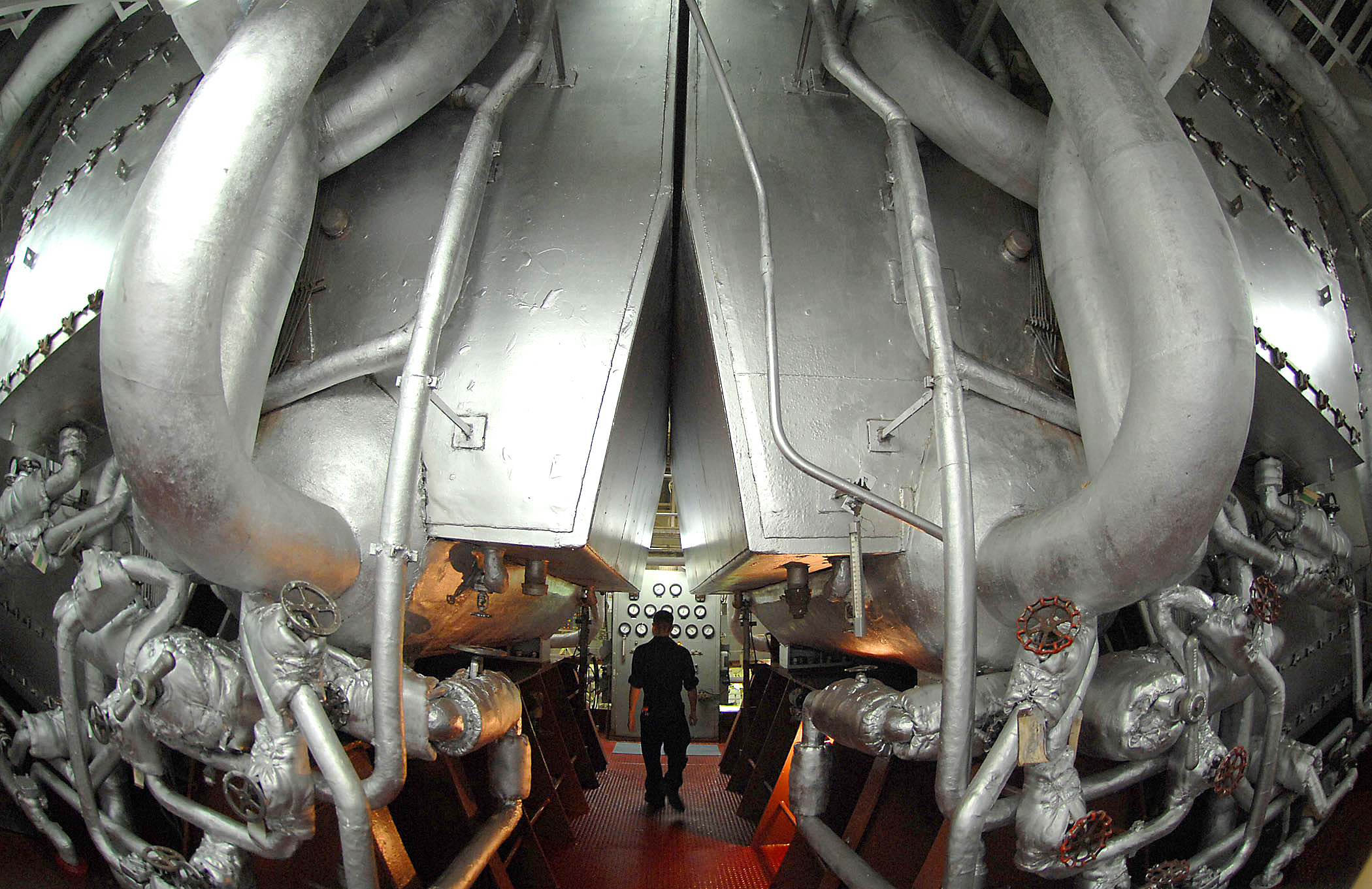
USNS Comfort's engine room

On 29 September 2017, the ship set sail for Puerto Rico to bring assistance to the island after Hurricane Maria had hit it nine days earlier. She arrived the evening of 3 October 2017. While in San Juan, Comfort hosted a summit with key stakeholders to synchronize efforts for the ship's mission throughout the area. The ship's 835 personnel partnered with Federal DMAT teams DMAT/COMFORT partnership and evaluated 6,003 patients, 1,912 patients were sent to Comfort 290 patients admitted, and 192 surgeries performed. She provided over 40,000 lab tests, over 16,000 prescriptions, 343 CT scans, and 1,169 radiology studies. Dental services provided acute dental care for 312 patients. However, she was there to support the sickest patients on the island. Comfort's 50-bed ICU had the highest acuity patients of any military hospital in the world. The ship acted as a support structure for all the island's hospitals taking their sickest ICU patients, the only oxygen producing plant on the island, she filled every hospital's oxygen tanks to help them support their patients. Additionally her sterilizers were used to sterilize, clean, and wrap surgery kits for multiple hospitals, using her ability to be a force multiplier allowing other hospitals to continue to provide care, and surgeries while they stabilized their power and facilities. She provided life saving care, including dialysis as well as fixed dialysis shunts and placed portacath shunts as the only working interventional radiology capability. This along with partnering with Puerto Rico's Health Department was able to diagnose cancers and assist in getting patients started on cancer therapy. She even had two births on board after receiving mothers who had been in labor in hallways for days. Her skilled providers provided necessary orthopedic surgeries, provided CT scans for her patients or ones referred from one of the other over 60 hospitals on island. This was at a cost of about $180,000 a day. As the island infrastructure improved the admission rate to the ship declined to 1% of patients presenting, she was ordered home on 17 November.

=== Operation Enduring Promise (2018) ===
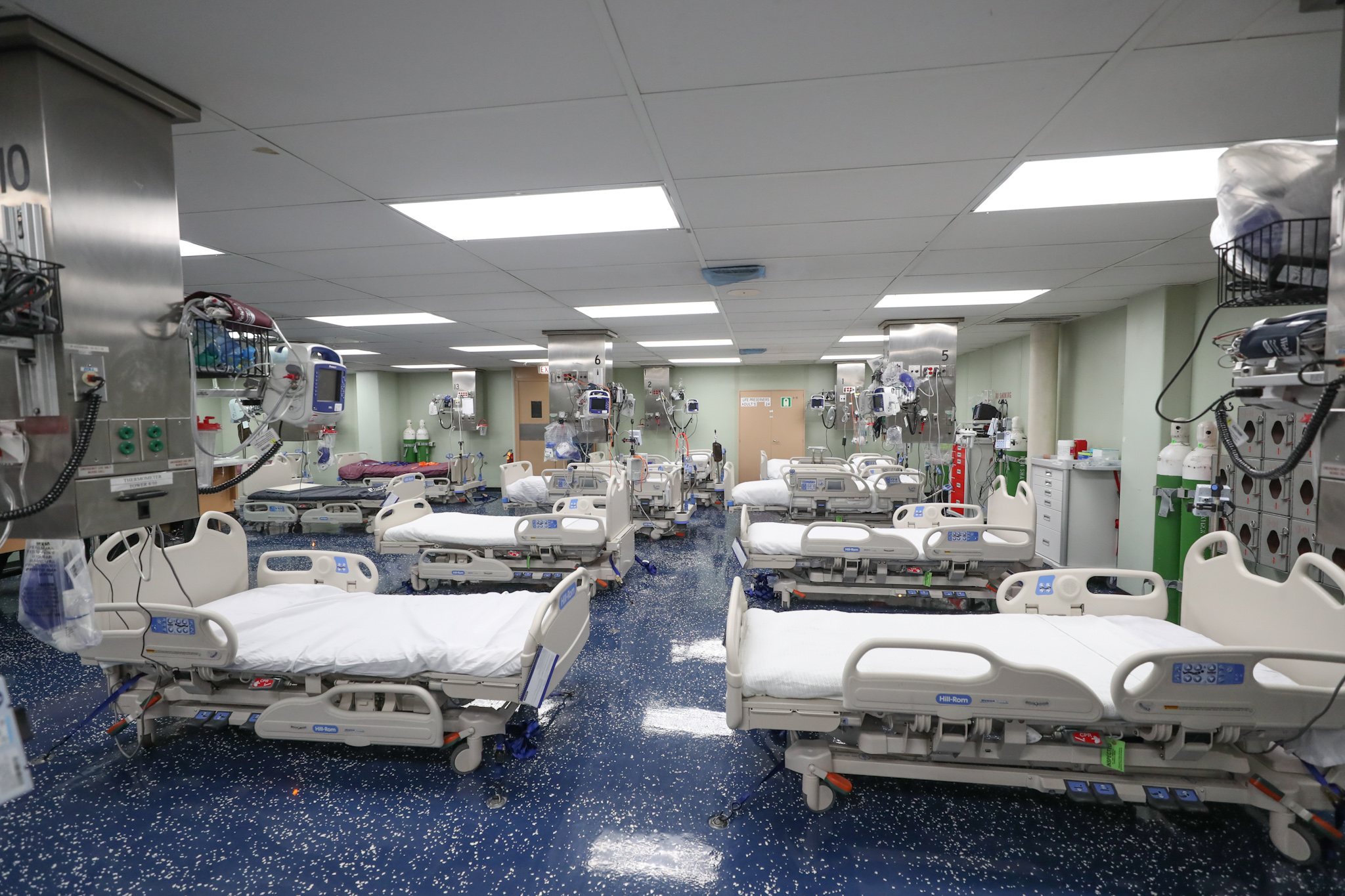
Hospital beds inside Comfort while in Peru in 2018

In October 2018, Comfort departed for an eleven-week operation in Latin America, with a primary mission being to assist countries that received refugees who fled the crisis in Venezuela. The main goal was to relieve health systems in Colombia, Ecuador, Peru and Honduras, which faced the arrival of thousands of Venezuelan migrants. She provided care for nearly 27,000 patients and performed 599 surgeries in 23 clinical days in five stops in four countries.

=== New York COVID-19 response (2020) ===
Comfort began deployment from Norfolk, Virginia, to New York Harbor on 28 March to help deal with the impact of the COVID-19 pandemic. Comfort arrived in New York on 30 March 2020. Initially, her mission was to treat patients who did not have the virus, freeing up land-based hospitals to focus on patients with COVID-19. But later half of the ship's 1000 beds were removed so that she could isolate and treat coronavirus patients. On 6 April 2020, COVID-19 patients were allowed onto the ship. One day later, the Navy announced that one crew member aboard Comfort had tested positive for the coronavirus and that several other crew members were put into isolation.

On 17 April the U.S. Northern Command announced that "the USNS COMFORT is prepared to admit patients within a one-hour traveling radius from the ship", and preparations were made to receive coronavirus patients from the Philadelphia area. On 21 April, Governor Andrew Cuomo told President Donald Trump that the ship was no longer needed in New York. Comfort departed on 30 April, having treated 179 patients.

== Awards and decorations ==
- Combat Action Ribbon – (26 Feb 1991)
- Joint Meritorious Unit Award – (Apr 1991–Dec 1996) Operation Provide Comfort
- Navy Unit Commendation – (Aug 1990–Mar 1991, May–Jul 1994)
- Navy Meritorious Unit Commendation – (Sep 1994–Mar 1995, Sep 2001–Jun 2005, Jun–Oct 2007)
- Armed Forces Expeditionary Medal – (Sep–Oct 1994)
- Southwest Asia Service Medal – (Aug 1990–Mar 1991)
- Humanitarian Service Medal – (Sep–Oct 2001, Sep–Oct 2005, Jan–Feb 2010, Sep–Nov 2017)

1st Row	Combat Action Ribbon	Joint Meritorious Unit Award	Navy Unit Commendation w/1 service star
2nd Row	Navy Meritorious Unit Commendation w/2 service star	Navy E Ribbon 2nd award	National Defense Service Medal w/1 service star
3rd Row	Armed Forces Expeditionary Medal	Southwest Asia Service Medal w/3 campaign stars	Global War on Terrorism Expeditionary Medal
4th Row	Global War on Terrorism Service Medal	Humanitarian Service Medal w/3 service stars	Kuwait Liberation Medal (Kuwait)

In 2008, the United Seamen's Service at its annual Admiral of the Ocean Sea Awards (AOTOS) event honored the masters and crews of hospital ships Comfort and Mercy with special Humanitarian Service Recognition Mariner's Plaques for their respective four-month humanitarian deployments to Latin America and the Caribbean in 2007 and Southeast Asia and the Pacific in 2008.

== General characteristics ==
- Specifications
  - Displacement:
    - Full Load: 69,390 Tons
    - Light: 24,275 Tons
  - Length:
    - Overall: 894 Feet (272.6 Meters)
    - Waterline: 854 5/6 Feet (260.6 Meters)
  - Beam: 105 3/4 Feet (32.25 Meters)
  - Draft: 32 5/6 Feet (10.0 Meters)
  - Propulsion: 1 Steam Turbine, 2 Boilers, 1 Shaft, 24,500 shaft horsepower (18,300 kW)
  - Speed: 17.5 Knots
  - Range: 13,400 Nautical Miles (24,817 Kilometers) at 17.5 knots (32.4 km/h)
  - Personnel:
    - Merchant Marine: 16 ROS; 61 Active
    - Navy Communications & Support: 58 (6 Officers, 52 Enlisted)
    - Medical and Dental (Active Only): 1,156
  - Aviation: Helicopter Landing Platform, 1 Spot
  - Radars: SPS-67 Surface Search
- Patient capacity:
  - Intensive care wards: 80 beds
  - Recovery wards: 20 beds
  - Intermediate care wards: 280 beds
  - Light care wards: 120 beds
  - Limited care wards: 500 beds
  - Total Patient Capacity: 1000 beds
  - Operating Rooms: 12
- Departments and facilities:
  - Casualty reception
  - Intensive care unit
  - Radiological services
  - Main laboratory plus satellite lab
  - Blood bank
  - Central sterile receiving
  - Medical supply/pharmacy
  - Physical therapy and burn care
  - Dental services
  - Optometry/lens lab
  - Morgue
  - Laundry
  - Oxygen producing plants (two)
  - Medical Photography
  - Four distilling plants to make drinking water from sea water (300,000 US gallons (1,100,000 L; 250,000 imp gal) per day)
