= Operation Continuing Promise =

Series of US military operations

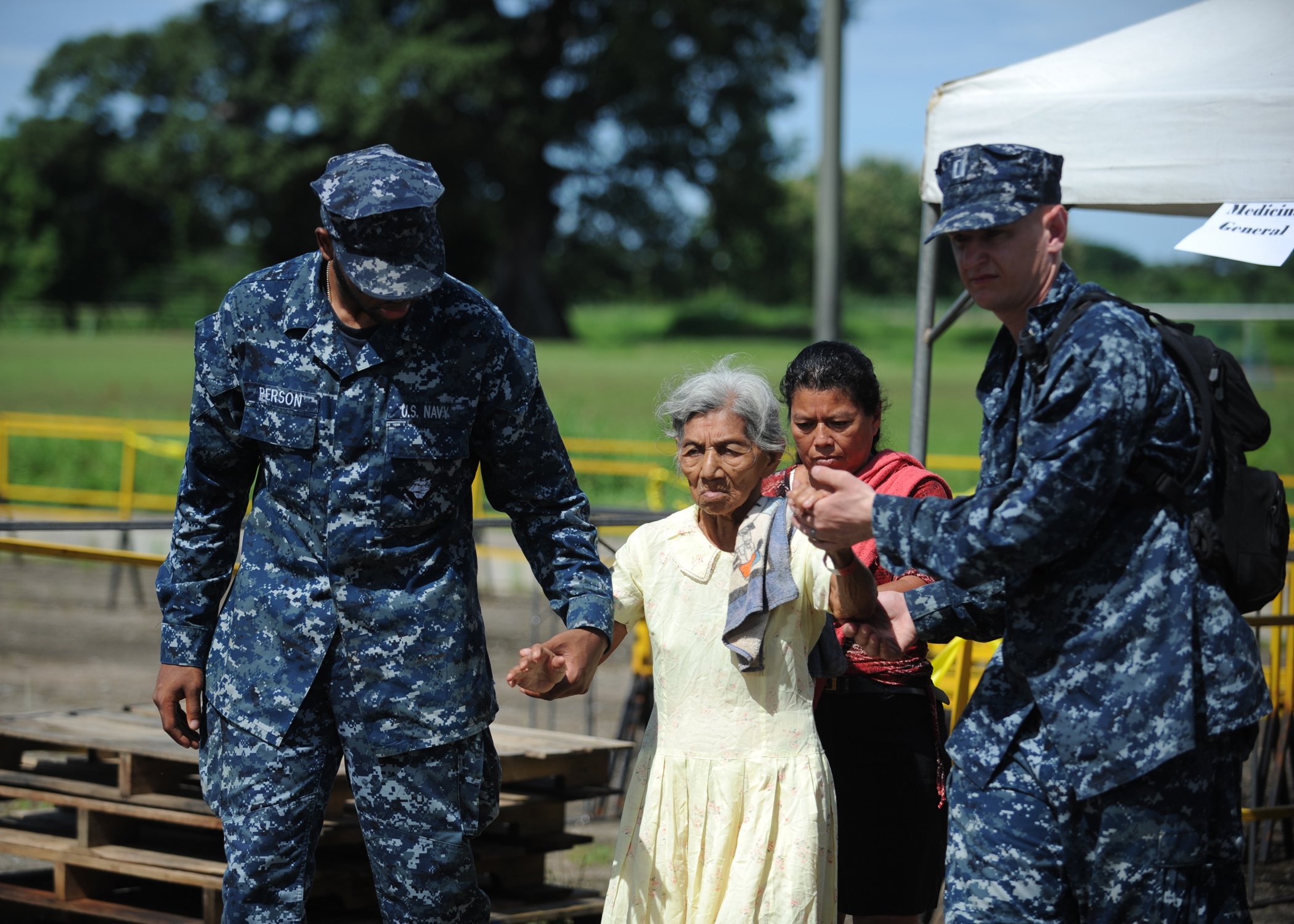
Escorting a patient into the clinic during Operation Continuing Promise 2011 in Acajutla, El Salvador, (July 15, 2011)

Operation Continuing Promise is a periodic series of US military exercises conducted under the direction of United States Southern Command. Designated by Roman numeral (“Continuing Promise I” was in 2007), or by year (“Continuing Promise 2009”); they provide medical, dental and veterinary aid to people in Latin America.

The two American hospital ships, USNS Comfort and USNS Mercy as well as other units participate in Continuing Promise to train their crews as well as supplemental personnel from the other branches of service and volunteer civilian organizations.

Each year, The Southern Command changes their "region of focus" for operation Continuing Promise.

CP-17 (Continuing Promise 2017) focused on Guatemala, Honduras, and Colombia.

Operation Continuing Promise 2015 was featured on the television show Mighty Ships's season 9 segment on USNS Comfort.
