= USNS Mercy =

Hospital ship of the United States Navy

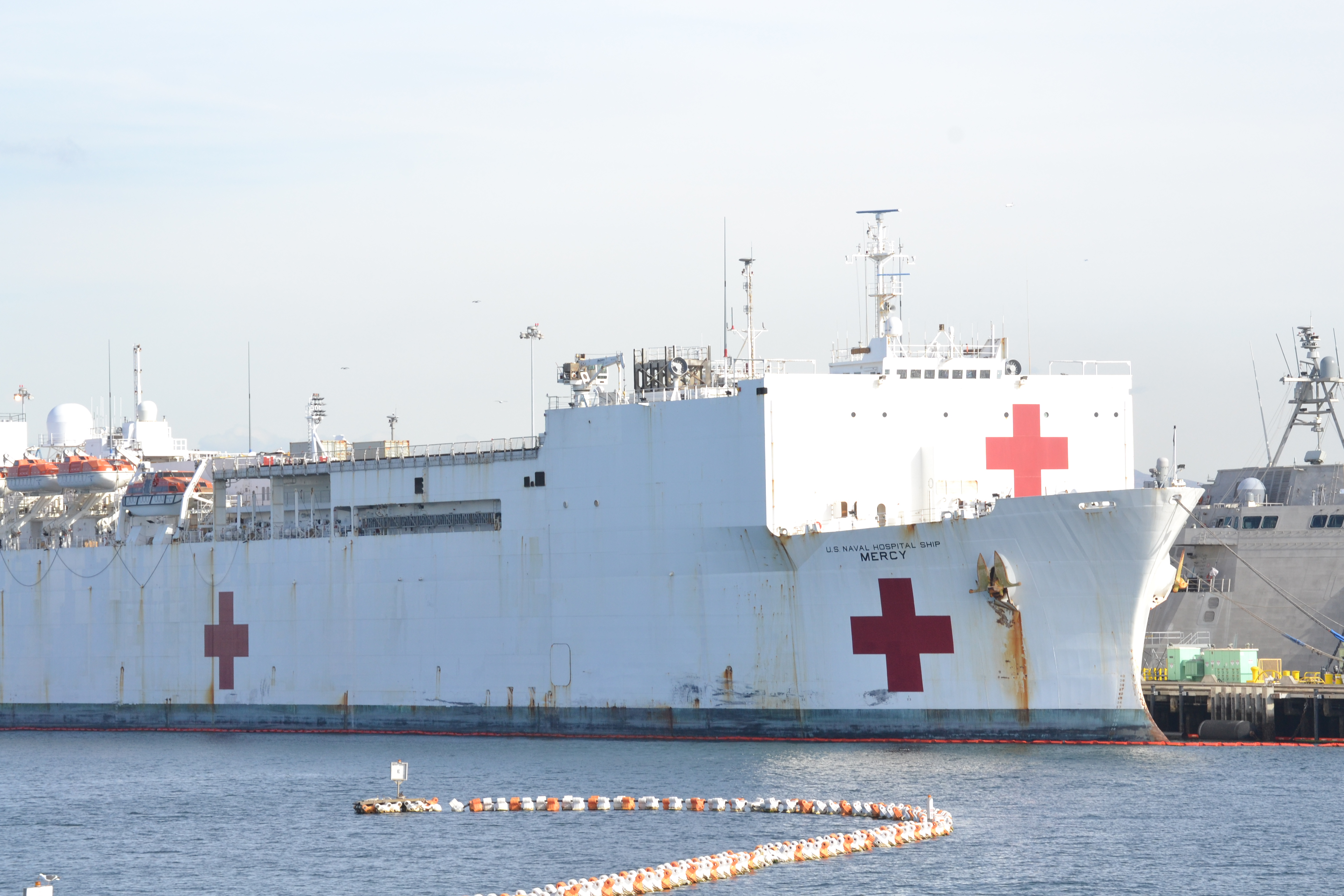
- USNS Mercy on 27 November 2024

History

United States
- Namesake: Mercy
- Builder: National Steel & Shipbuilding
- Laid down: 12 June 1974 (as San Clemente-class oil tanker SS Worth MA-299)
- Launched: 1 July 1975
- In service: 8 November 1986 (to the US Navy)
- Home port: Naval Base San Diego
- Identification: IMO number: 7390454; MMSI number: 367816000; Callsign: NMER
- Motto: "Steaming to Assist"
- Status: in active service
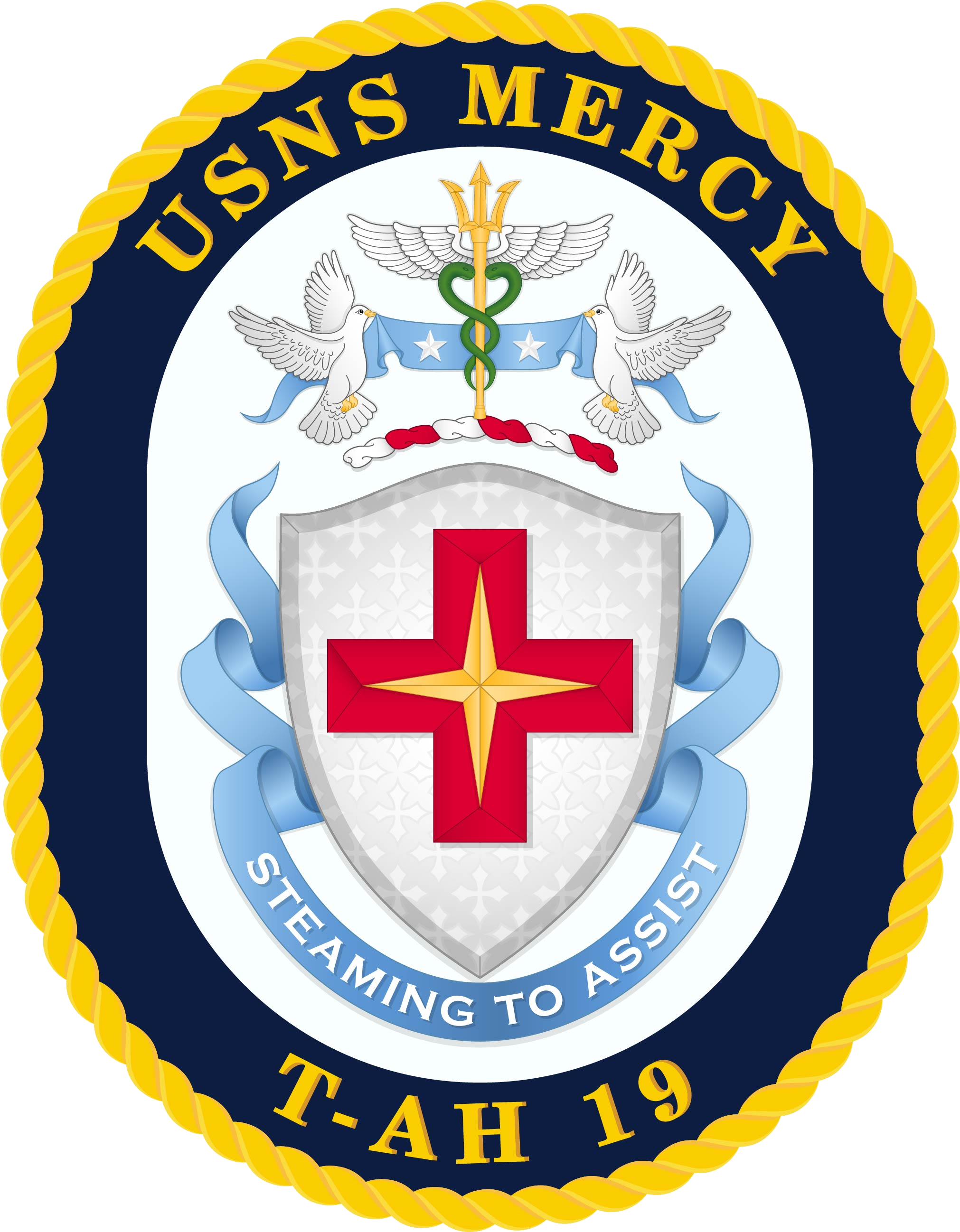
- Badge

General characteristics
- Class & type: Mercy-class hospital ship
- Displacement: 65,552 tons
- Length: 894 ft (272 m)
- Beam: 106 ft (32 m)
- Propulsion: two boilers, two GE turbines, one shaft, 24,500 hp (18.3 MW)
- Speed: 17 kn (31 km/h; 20 mph)
- Capacity: 1000 patient beds
- Complement: 12 civilian and 58 military during Reduced Operating Status; 61 civilian and 1,214 military during Full Operating Status
- Time to activate: 5 days

USNS Mercy (T-AH-19) is the lead ship of her class of hospital ships in non-commissioned service with the United States Navy. Her sister ship is USNS Comfort (T-AH-20). She is the third US Navy ship to be named after the virtue mercy. In accordance with the Geneva Conventions, Mercy and her crew do not carry any offensive weapons, though defensive weapons are available.

United States Naval Ship (USNS) Mercy was built as a San Clemente-class oil tanker named Worth by National Steel & Shipbuilding in San Diego in 1976. Starting in July 1984, she was renamed and converted to a hospital ship by the same company. Launched on 20 July 1985, Mercy was placed in service on 8 November 1986. She has a raised forecastle, a transom stern, a bulbous bow, an extended deckhouse with a forward bridge, and a helicopter-landing deck with a flight-control facility.

The conversions from oil tankers cost $208 million per ship and took 35 months to complete. The Mercy-class hospital ships are the third largest ships in the US Navy Fleet by length, surpassed only by the nuclear-powered Nimitz- and Gerald R. Ford-class supercarriers.

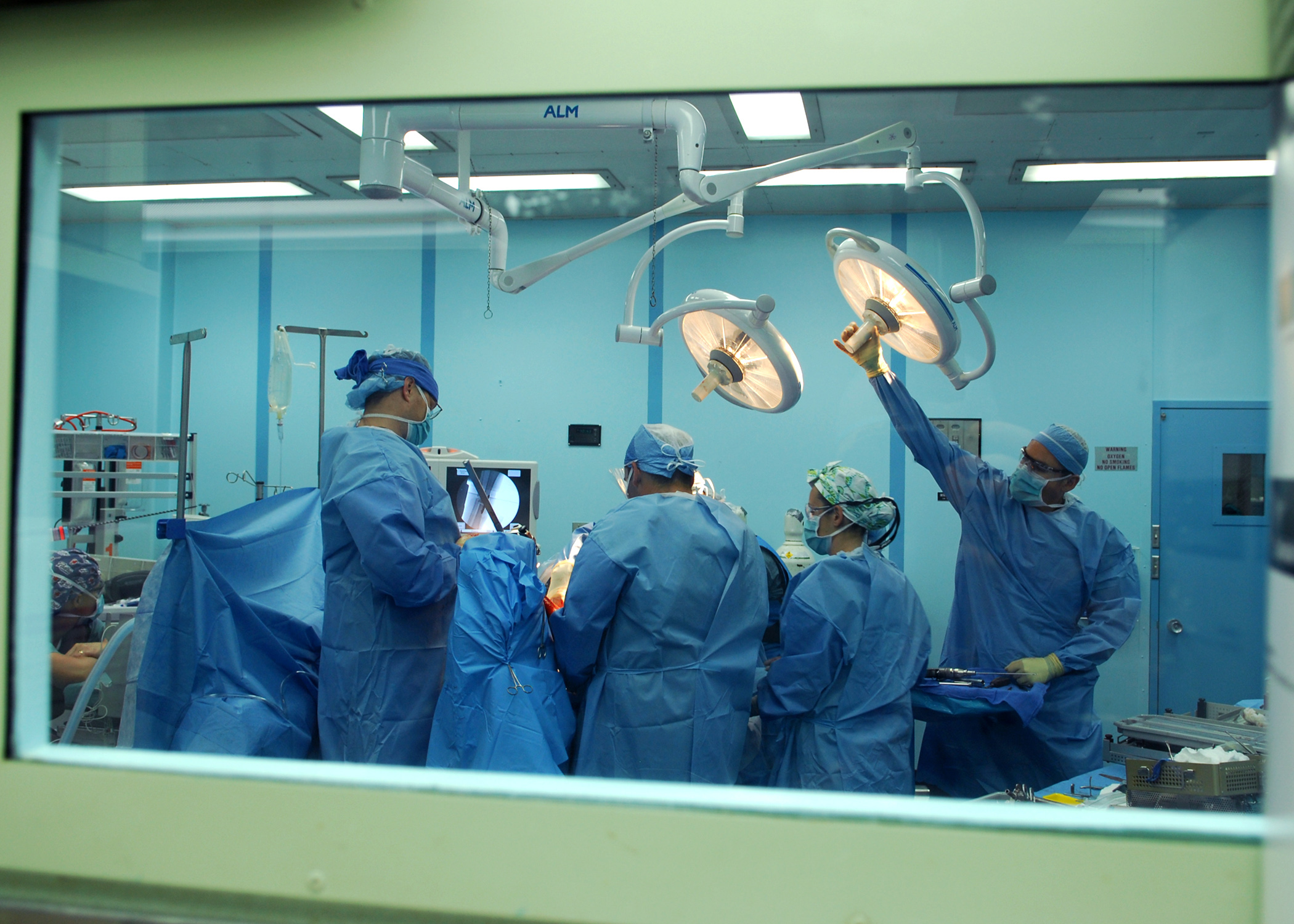
Orthopedic surgery performed in one of the ship's operating rooms

Her primary mission is to provide medical and surgical services to support Marine Corps Air/Ground Task Forces deployed ashore, Army and Air Force units deployed ashore, and naval amphibious task forces and battle forces afloat. Secondarily, she provides mobile surgical hospital service for use by appropriate US Government agencies in disaster and humanitarian relief, and limited humanitarian care incident to these missions and to peacetime military operations.

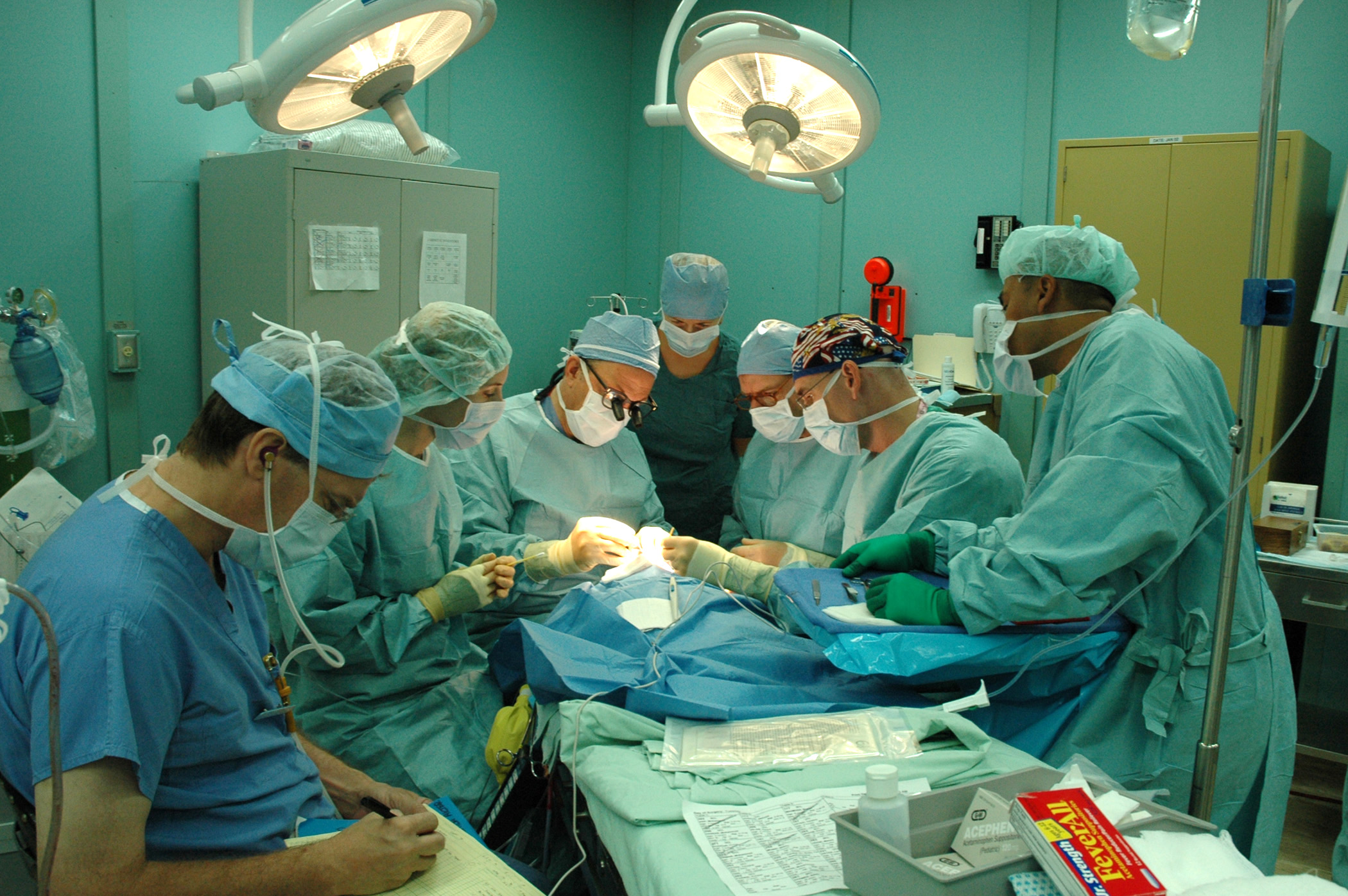
Medical staff from Operation Smile and the Military Treatment Facility aboard Mercy, perform a cleft lip surgery during the ship's visit to provide humanitarian and civic assistance to the people of Bangladesh

Mercy, homeported in San Diego, is normally in reduced operating status. Her crew remains a part of the staff of Naval Medical Center San Diego until ordered to sea, at which time they have five days to fully activate the ship to a NATO Role III Medical Treatment Facility, with the only higher level being filled by onshore fixed facilities outside the theater of operations. As of February 2026, the ship was underway from Alabama Shipyard through the Panama Canal scheduled for a 6-month $89 million drydocking maintenance in Portland, Oregon. It arrived in Portland in mid-March 2026.

Like most USNS ships, mariners from the US Navy's Military Sealift Command are responsible for navigation, propulsion, and most deck duties on board. Mercy is as of 2012 part of MSC's Service Support Program. The "Medical Treatment Facility", or hospital on the ship, is commanded by a captain of the Navy Medical Corps or Navy Nurse Corps.

== Deployments ==
=== Philippine Training Mission (1987) ===
On 27 February 1987, Mercy began training while en route on a humanitarian cruise to the Philippines and the South Pacific. The staff included United States Navy, Indian Navy, United States Army and United States Air Force active duty and reserve personnel; United States Public Health Service; medical providers from the Armed Forces of the Philippines; and MSC civilian mariners. Over 62,000 outpatients and almost 1,000 inpatients were treated at seven Philippine and South Pacific ports. Mercy returned to Oakland, California, on 13 July 1987.

=== Operation Desert Shield/Desert Storm (1990–91) ===
On 9 August 1990, Mercy was activated in support of Operation Desert Shield. Departing on 15 August, she arrived in the Persian Gulf on 15 September. For the next six months, Mercy provided support to multinational allied forces. She admitted 690 patients and performed almost 300 surgeries. After treating the 21 American and two Italian repatriated prisoners of war, she departed for home on 16 March 1991, arriving in Oakland on 23 April.

=== Operation Unified Assistance (2004) ===
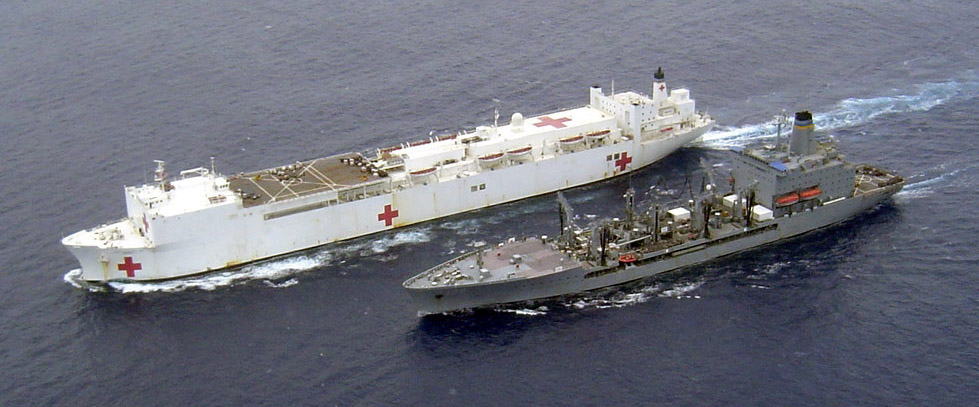
Mercy being refuelled at sea by USNS Tippecanoe, April 2005 during the ship's mission to aid people following the 2004 Indian Ocean tsunami

Mercy departed San Diego on 5 January 2005 en route to the tsunami-devastated regions of Southeast Asia, where she provided medical care to the victims of the disaster as part of Operation Unified Assistance, and further care as part of Theater Security Cooperation Program 2005. Combined, she provided over 107,000 patient services, rendered by members of the Department of Defense, Project HOPE, and the United States Public Health Service.

=== Pacific Partnership (2006) ===
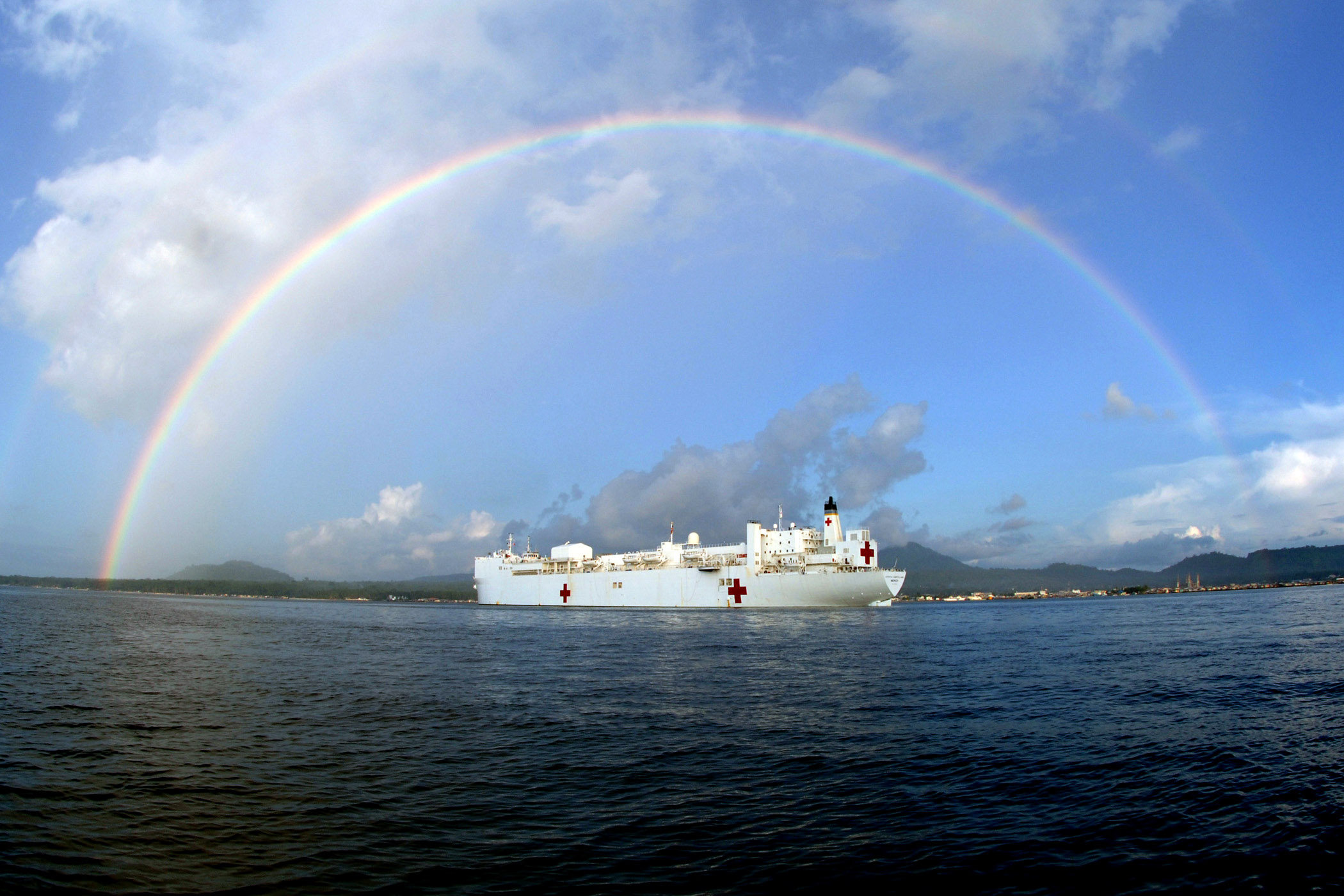
Mercy anchored off Jolo, Philippines in June 2006

Mercy departed San Diego in 2006 as the inaugural deployment of Pacific Partnership, an ongoing Civic Assistance mission designed to "Prepare in Calm to Respond in Crisis". She visited several ports in the South Pacific Ocean including the Philippines, Indonesia, and Banda Aceh. The ship's primary mission was to provide humanitarian assistance to these countries, and her staff included several non-governmental organizations, doctors from the armed services of several countries, as well as active-duty and reserve military providers from many branches of the US Armed Forces.

=== Pacific Partnership (2008) ===
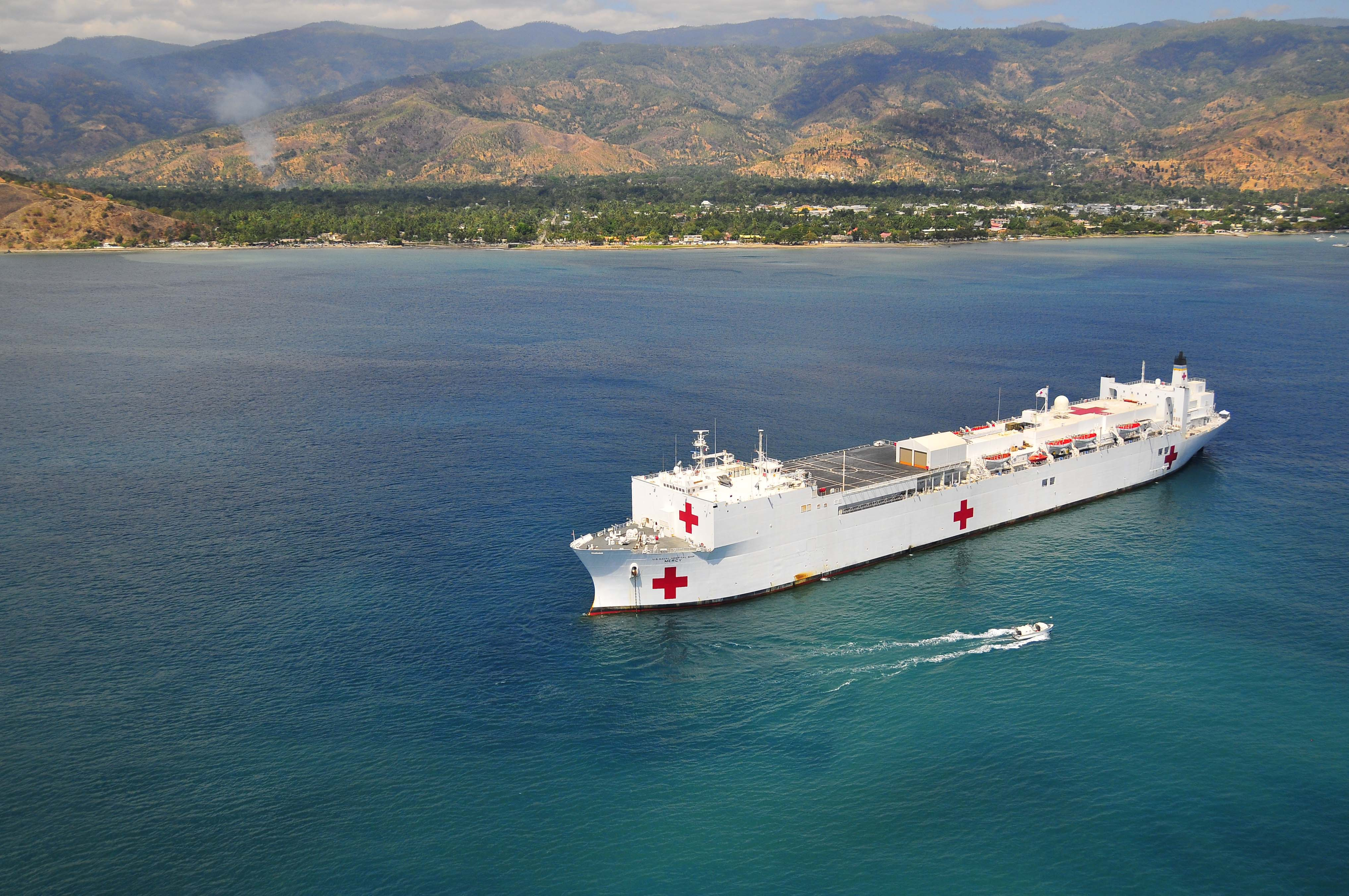
Mercy anchored in Dili, East Timor, as part of Pacific Partnership 2008

Mercy departed San Diego on 14 April 2008 for Pacific Partnership 2008, a four-month humanitarian and civic deployment in Southeast Asia and Oceania. Mercy, with 900 officers and sailors, included 300 US health and construction experts. Partners participating in the mission included the nations of Australia, Canada, Chile, Japan, South Korea, New Zealand, and Portugal, as well as several non-governmental organizations. Originally intended to visit the Philippines, Vietnam, the Federated States of Micronesia, East Timor, and Papua New Guinea, Mercy was to be redirected to the Bay of Bengal to provide immediate assistance to victims of the cyclone in Burma, but relief efforts in Burma were called off. On 10 June, the humanitarian mission was temporarily suspended after one of the ship's helicopters was shot at in the strife-torn southern Philippines area of Mindanao. Over the course of the deployment, Mercy would treat 91,000 patients, including performing 1,369 surgeries.

=== Pacific Partnership (2010) ===
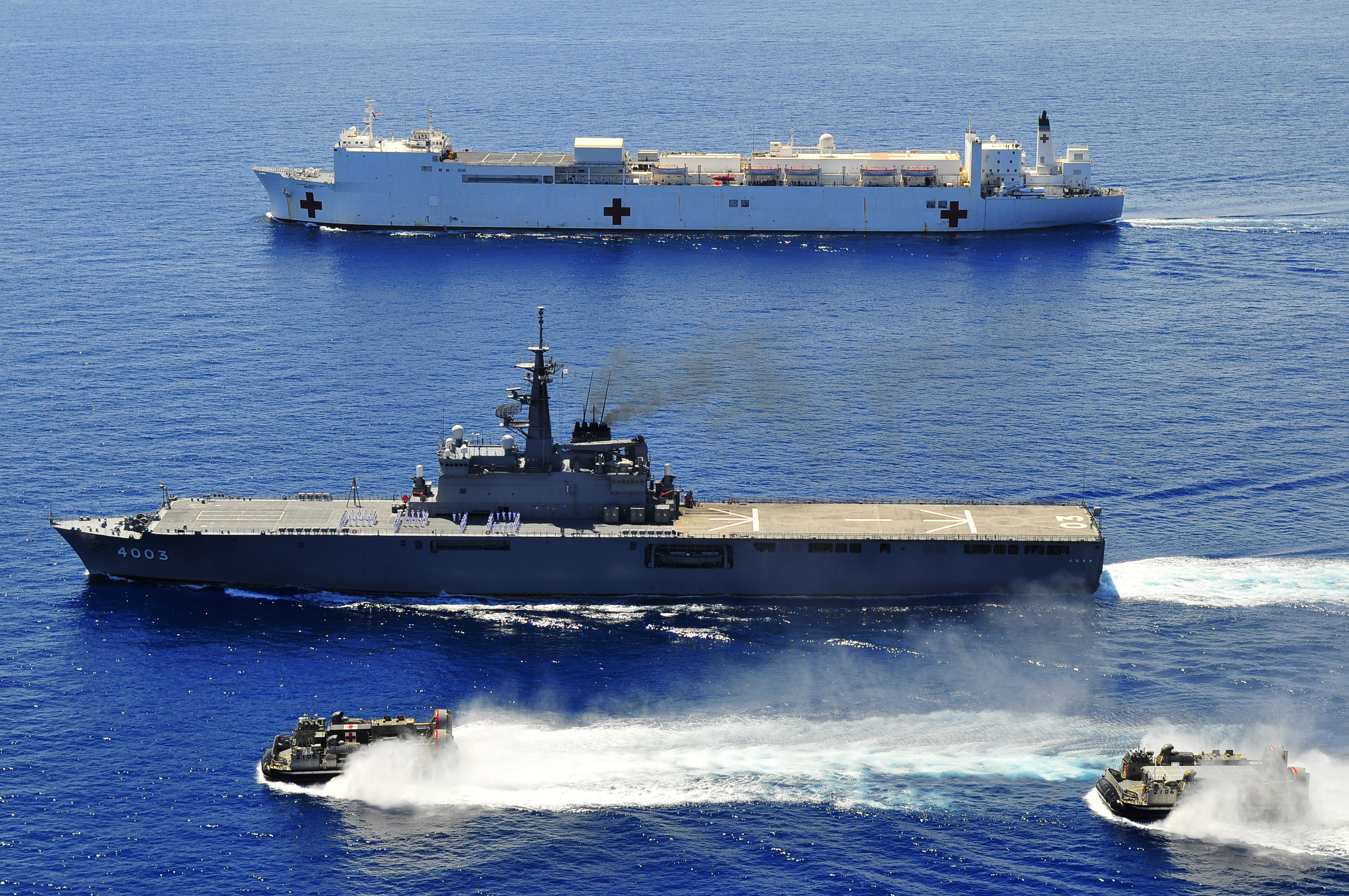
JDS Kunisaki (LST-4003), two Japanese Landing Craft Air Cushion hovercraft and USNS Mercy (T-AH-19) during Pacific Partnership 2010

On 24 February 2010, the Commander of the US Pacific Fleet announced that Mercy will be the lead vessel of Pacific Partnership 2010, a continuation of the recurring humanitarian mission to Southeast Asia and Oceania. For Pacific Partnership 2010 Mercy visited Vietnam, Cambodia, Indonesia, and East Timor; treated 109,754 patients, and performed 1,580 surgeries.

=== Pacific Partnership (2012) ===
3 May 2012 saw Mercy depart San Diego once again for Pacific Partnership 2012, the latest deployment of the Pacific Partnership series. In an effort to further expand the scope of the mission of "Preparing in Calm to Respond in Crisis", many more man hours of Subject Matter Expert Exchange (SMEE) with host nations, Veterinary Care, and construction projects were performed compared to past Mercy deployments, building the capacity of host nations to respond to regional disasters in a coordinated manner. The ship visited Indonesia, the Philippines, Vietnam, and Cambodia carrying personnel not only from the Department of Defense, but also 13 partner nations and 28 non-governmental organizations.

The National Conflict Resolution Center honored the master and crew of hospital ship USNS Mercy with its 25th annual Peacemaker Award for her participation in Pacific Partnership (2012).

=== Aftermath of Typhoon Haiyan (2013) ===
In mid-November 2013, Mercy was ordered to activate for Operation Damayan, the relief effort in response to the devastation caused by Typhoon Haiyan, which struck the Philippines on 7 November 2013. However, Mercy was deactivated before sailing.

=== Rim of the Pacific (RIMPAC) (2014) ===
The US Navy announced that Mercy would be participating in RIMPAC 2014, a large multi-national naval exercise involving ships and personnel from 23 countries. In addition to providing medical and surgical care to personnel injured during the exercise, Mercy participated in multi-lateral Subject Matter Expert Exchanges with other military medical professionals. In addition, Mercy steamed with Peace Ark, the hospital ship from the People's Republic of China during phases of the exercise.

=== Pacific Partnership (2015) ===
Ten years after the relief effort for victims of the Indian Ocean tsunami, US Pacific Fleet announced that Mercy would once again participate in Pacific Partnership. Focusing on Subject Matter Expert Exchanges and Community Health Engagements, Pacific Partnership 15 looks to continue the mission of helping nations in the region "Prepare in Calm to Respond in Crisis". Countries hosting Mercy include Fiji, Papua New Guinea, the Philippines and Vietnam.

=== Pacific Partnership (2016) ===
Celebrating 10 years of Pacific Partnership, US Pacific Fleet announced that Mercy would continue to participate in the ongoing series of Disaster Preparedness missions. Focusing on local Subject Matter Expert Exchanges, Pacific Partnership 16 continues to "Prepare in Calm to Respond in Crisis". Countries that have invited Mercy include East Timor, Malaysia, Indonesia, the Philippines and Vietnam.

=== Pacific Partnership (2018) ===
US Pacific Fleet announced that Mercy would set sail to Sri Lanka for Pacific Partnership 2018.

The United Seamen's Service at its annual Admiral of the Ocean Sea Awards (AOTOS) event honored the masters and crews of hospital ship USNS Mercy with Special Recognition Mariner's Plaque for her participation in Pacific Partnership (2018).

=== Operational responses during the COVID-19 pandemic (2020) ===
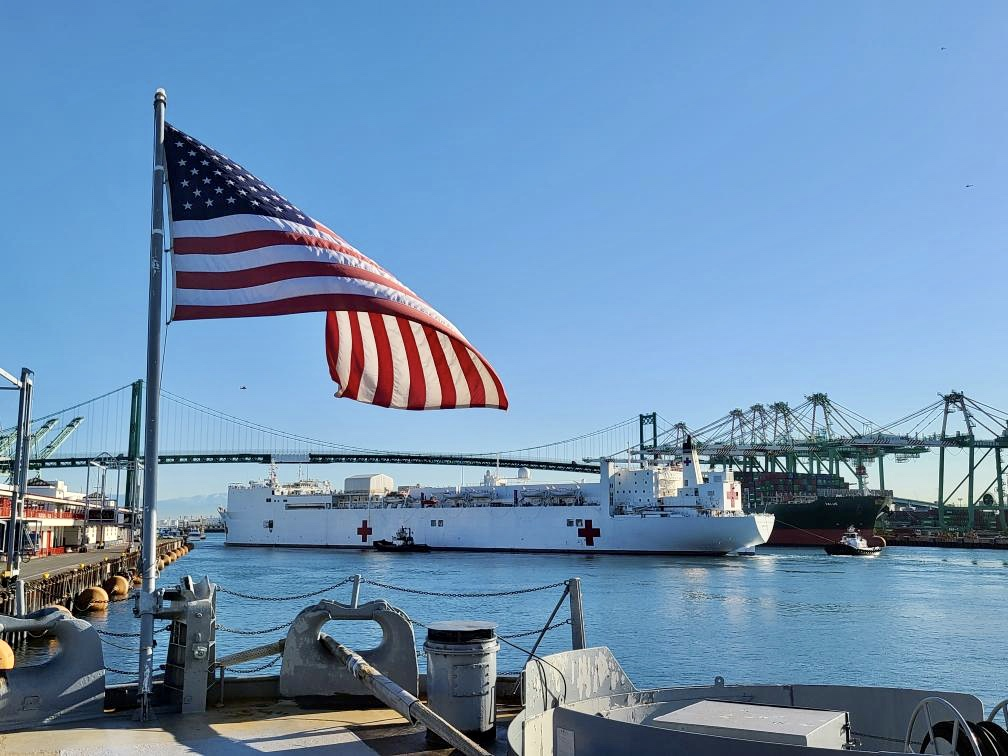
Mercy arriving in Los Angeles on 27 March 2020

From March until May 2020, Mercy was deployed to Los Angeles to provide hospital relief in response to the COVID-19 pandemic. The ship arrived and docked at the Port of Los Angeles cruise ship terminal on 27 March 2020, and departed on May 16. The ship's mission was to treat patients other than those with COVID-19, freeing up land-based hospitals to deal with the virus. The deployment mirrors USNS Comfort's simultaneous mission to support New York's COVID-19 response. As of 15 April, Mercy had treated 48 patients, of whom 30 had been discharged. Seven crew members have tested positive for the virus and been removed from the ship for quarantine; 100 other sailors who had contact with them were also removed for quarantine. She arrived back in San Diego on 15 May. This was followed by a seven-month maintenance period during which a flight deck was created between the forecastle and the aftercastle, for two large helicopters, the V-22 Osprey and MH-60 Seahawk. Mercy can also refuel aircraft.

==== Train derailment ====
On 31 March 2020, while Mercy was docked, a Pacific Harbor Line freight train was deliberately derailed by its onboard engineer in an attempt to crash into the ship, but the attack was unsuccessful. According to U.S. federal prosecutors, the train's engineer "was suspicious of the Mercy, believing it had an alternate purpose related to COVID-19 or a government takeover". The train came to a stop approximately 750 feet (230 m) from the ship after destroying several barriers and suffered a substantial fuel oil leak requiring cleanup from fire fighters and hazardous materials personnel. No one was injured and the ship was not harmed; the engineer was charged with train wrecking and terrorism. The engineer later cited Qanon and COVID-19 conspiracy theories as the reasons for his attack.

== Awards and decorations ==
- Navy Unit Commendation – (Aug 1990–Mar 1991)
- Navy Meritorious Unit Commendation – (Feb–Jul 1987, Sep 2001–Jun 2005, Apr–Sep 2006, May–Sep 2010)
- Southwest Asia Service Medal – (Sep 1990–Mar 1991)
- Humanitarian Service Medal – (Dec 2004–Feb 2005, Operation Unified Assistance; May–Jun 2006)
- Philippine Republic Presidential Unit Citation – (Feb–Jul 1987)

1st row	Navy Unit Commendation		
2nd row	Navy Meritorious Unit Commendation w/3 service stars	National Defense Service Medal w/1 service star	Southwest Asia Service Medal w/3 campaign stars
3rd row	Global War on Terrorism Expeditionary Medal	Humanitarian Service Medal w/1 service star	Philippine Republic Presidential Unit Citation

== General characteristics ==
- Specifications:
  - Displacement:
    - Full load: 69,390 tons
    - Light: 24,275 tons
  - Length:
    - Overall: 894 feet (272.6 meters)
    - Waterline: 854 5/6 feet (260.6 meters)
  - Beam: 105 3/4 feet (32.25 meters)
  - Draft: 32 5/6 feet (10.0 meters)
  - Propulsion: 1 steam turbine, 2 boilers, 1 shaft, 24,500 shaft horsepower
  - Speed: 17.5 knots
  - Range: 13,400 nautical miles (24,817 kilometers) at 17.5 knots
  - Personnel:
    - Merchant Marine: 16 ROS; 61 active
    - Navy communications & support: 58 (6 officers, 52 enlisted)
    - Medical and dental (active only): 1,156
  - Aviation: helicopter landing platform, 2 spots
- Patient capacity:
  - Intensive care wards: 80 beds
  - Recovery wards: 20 beds
  - Intermediate care wards: 280 beds
  - Light care wards: 120 beds
  - Limited care wards: 500 beds
  - Total patient capacity: 1000 beds
  - Operating rooms: 12
- Departments and facilities:
  - Casualty reception
  - Radiological services including CT
  - Main laboratory plus satellite lab
  - Central sterile processing
  - Medical supply/pharmacy
  - Physical therapy and burn care
  - Intensive care unit
  - Dental services
  - Optometry/lens lab
  - Morgue
  - Laundry
  - Burn treatment
  - Angiography
  - Blood bank
  - Oxygen producing plants (two)

== See also ==
- Operation Continuing Promise
- MV Global Mercy, a civilian hospital ship run by the international charity NGO Mercy Ships
