= A Story of Healing =

- Directed by: Donna Dewey
- Starring: Donna Dewey
- Production company: Dewey-Obenchain Films
- Distributed by: Interplast
- Release date: 1997
- Running time: 28 minutes
- Country: United States
- Language: English

A Story of Healing is a short documentary film in which Donna Dewey follows a team of five nurses, four anesthesiologists, and three plastic surgeons led by Larry Nichter from Interplast, now ReSurge International, in the United States for two weeks of volunteer work in the Mekong Delta of Vietnam. The film shows not only how this changes the lives of the 110 patients who undergo surgery, but also the lives of the volunteers themselves. The epilogue, which runs after the credits, follows-up on two patients helped by Interplast 16 months after their surgery.

In 1998, "A Story of Healing" won the Academy Award for Best Documentary (Short Subject). In 2007, it became the first Oscar-winning film to be licensed under a Creative Commons license when it was opened under the Attribution-NonCommercial-NoDerivatives License.
