= San Clemente-class oil tanker =

Class of oil tankers

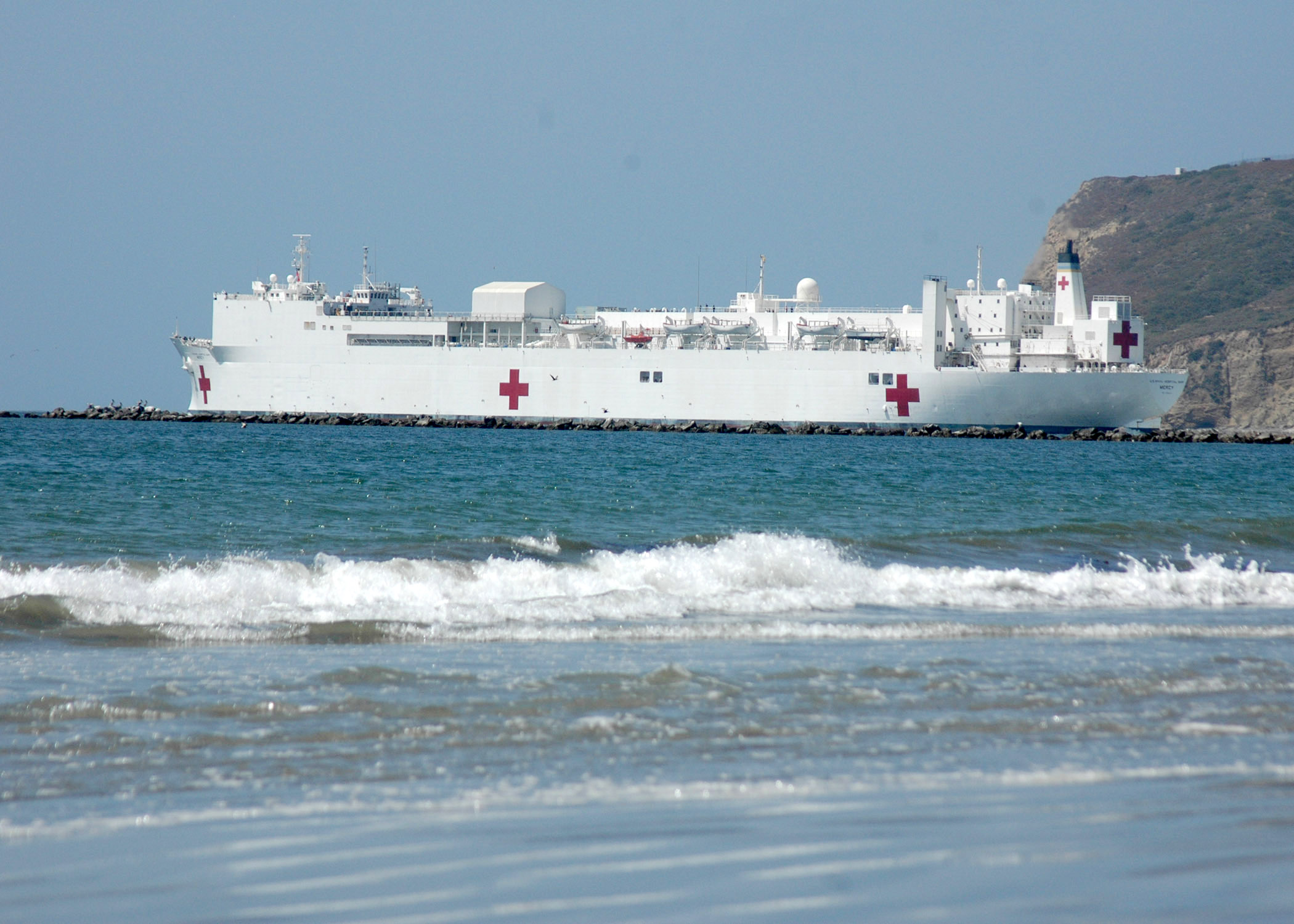
- USNS Mercy leaving San Diego Bay in May 2008

Class overview
- Builders: National Steel & Shipbuilding Company
- Subclasses: T-AH-19
- Built: 1974-1978
- Completed: 13
- Active: 6, 2 as Mercy-class hospital ship
- Lost: 1

General characteristics
- Type: Oil tanker - two Hospital ships
- Tonnage: 89,700 dwt
- Length: 894 ft (272 m)
- Beam: 105 ft (32 m)
- Draft: 64 ft 6 in (19.66 m)
- Propulsion: Steam, 24,500 bhp (18,300 kW)
- Speed: 16.5 knots (30.6 km/h; 19.0 mph) at 90% MCR, Full Load
- Capacity: 32,5000 Cu feet
- Crew: 21 (Hospital ship 1,000)

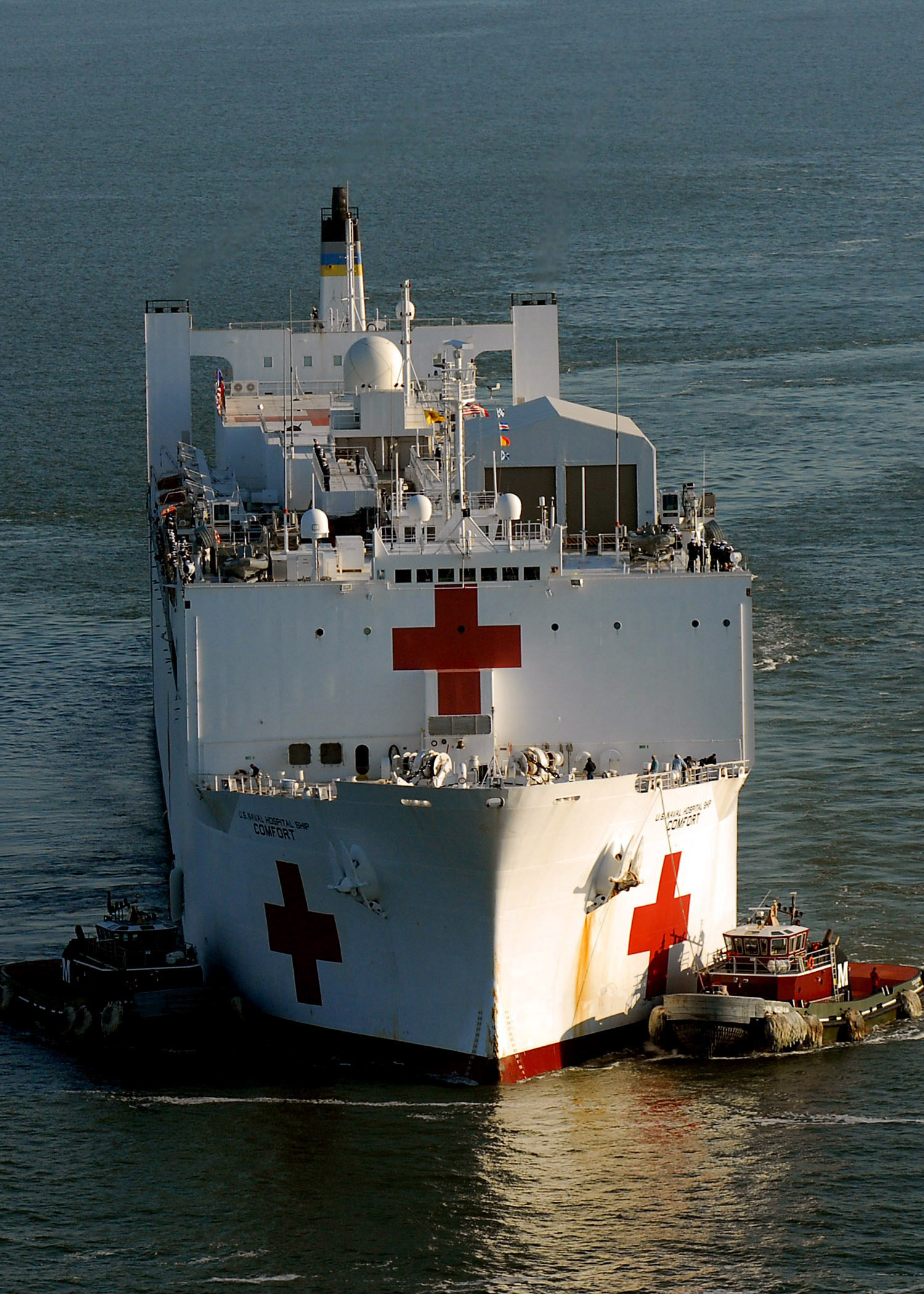
USNS Comfort (T-AH-20)

The San Clemente-class oil tanker is a class of oil tankers built by National Steel & Shipbuilding Company (NASSCO), San Diego. The size places them in the category of super tankers. They were built to serve the Trans-Alaska Pipeline System. At the time of completion NASSCO was equally owned by Kaiser Industries Corporation and Morrison Knudsen.

NASSCO also built the San Diego-class tankers at 180,000-dwt, Catalina-class tankers at 150,000- dwt and the Coronado-class tankers at 38,300-dwt. NASSCO also built for the US Navy Yellowstone-class destroyer tender (AD-41 class) at 19,800-ton each.

Two ships were converted by NASSCO to T-AH-19 hospital ships. The two hospital ships were delivered to the US Navy in 1986 and 1987 as Naval Auxiliary Fleet ships. The two provided for the Navy deployable acute medical care facility. Each has 1,000-bed medical care unit. They are used for armed forces and mercy missions to damaged locations, like after a typhoon.

== Design ==
Each ship is 894 feet long, with a beam of 105 feet and depths-draft of 64 feet. This is the maximum size, known as Panamax, that can pass through the Panama Canal. All the ships in the class have a double hull bottom for safety. They came with anti-collision radar, bacteria-enzyme sewage treatment plant and high-capacity clean ballast systems.

== Owners ==
- Aeron Marine Shipping Co.
- Third Group
- Maritime Overseas Corp. (now Overseas Shipholding Group)
- Chestnut Shipping Co.
- United States Navy

== Ships in class ==
- SS Beaver State, renamed Liberty Belle in 1988, scrapped 1995
- SS American Heritage, Scrapped 1994
- SS Golden Dolphin, launched on January 19, 1974, Explosion/sunk off Azores, 1982
- SS Golden Endeavor, launched 1976, Scrapped 1995
- SS Aframax
- SS Overseas New York, Scrapped 2004
- SS Overseas Chicago, Scrapped 2004
- SS Overseas Ohio, renamed S/R Hinchinbrook in 2000, scrapped 2004
- SS Overseas Washington, Scrapped 2006
- SS Overseas Arctic
- SS Chestnut Hill, launched June 22, 1976.
- SS Kittaning, launched February 20, 1977.

=== Converted to hospital ships ===
- USNS Mercy (T-AH-19) built as SS Worth in 1974, converted in 1984.
- USNS Comfort (T-AH-20) built as SS Rose City in May 1975, converted in 1986.
