= ReSurge International =

International humanitarian organization

ReSurge International, formerly known as Interplast, is an international humanitarian organization that provides free reconstructive surgery in developing countries, primarily to children with cleft lip and palate and burn scar contractures.

ReSurge International, Interplast at the time, was founded in 1969 by Stanford plastic surgeon Donald Laub, and as of 2023, has treated more than 124,000 patients worldwide. The first patient was a 13-year-old boy who had come to Stanford University Medical Center from his home in Mexicali, Mexico, to receive surgery to repair his cleft lip and palate. Soon after, Laub and other surgeons began organizing regular trips to a charity hospital in Mexicali to treat children with disabling deformities.

Inherent in the goals of organizations such as ReSurge Inter-national is the supposition that many such disabling conditions can be greatly alleviated or even resolved through plastic surgical intervention.

Interplast was the subject of "A Story of Healing", winner of the 1997 Academy Award for Documentary Short Subject. Interplast still exists under the Interplast name in Australia.

== See also ==
- Cleft lip and palate organisations
