= Donald Laub =

American plastic surgeon (1935–2024)

Donald R. Laub
- Born: January 1, 1935; Milwaukee, Wisconsin, U.S.
- Died: April 26, 2024 (aged 89); Redwood City, California, U.S.
- Education: Marquette University
- Occupation: Surgeon
- Website: https://www.forevermissed.com/don-laub-md/about]

Donald Rudolf Laub Sr. (January 1, 1935 – April 26, 2024) was an American plastic surgeon and founder of Interplast, which led multidisciplinary teams on reconstructive surgery missions to developing countries.

== Education ==
Laub earned an MD from the Marquette University School of Medicine in 1960. After completing his internship and surgical residency at the Yale School of Medicine, he moved to Stanford University, where he assumed an assistant professorship and co-founded a 6-year integrated plastic surgery residency program as well as the Stanford Primary Care Associate Program. He then served as chief of Plastic Surgery at Stanford University School of Medicine from 1968 to 1980, before entering private practice.

== Accomplishments ==
=== Interplast ===
Laub's experience operating on Antonio, a 13-year-old boy from Mexico who was born with cleft lip, prompted him to wish to help others from similarly underprivileged backgrounds through surgery. In 1969, Laub founded ReSurge International (formerly called Interplast), an organization devoted to plastic and reconstructive surgery in under-resourced areas. He became the first academic to develop and lead multidisciplinary teams on humanitarian surgical trips to developing countries, participating in 159 surgical service trips himself. Interplast changed its name to ReSurge International in 2011 to distinguish itself from other Interplast chapters founded around the world by Interplast alumni and supporters.

=== Gender Affirmation Surgery ===
Laub made one of the first academic investigations into the efficacy of treating gender dysphoria with surgery. He pioneered the rectosigmoid vaginoplasty. He also invented the metoidioplasty and the post-modern phalloplasty. These innovations improved phalloplasty by allowing constructed male structures to naturally urinate and engage in sexual intercourse. From 1981 to 1983, he served as the second President of the Harry Benjamin International Gender Dysphoria Association, now known as the World Professional Association for Transgender Health. Over the course of his career as a plastic surgeon working in collaboration with Stanford and other organizations, he managed around 2,000 transgender patients, delivering his new innovations to those in need of them.

=== Other contributions ===
Laub’s further professional achievements include developing Q switched ruby laser tattoo removal and the use of medical chemicals to reduce risk of skin cancer while improving cosmetic appearance.

He and James B. Johnson developed the "alternate day calorie restriction diet," which they published in the controversial and non-peer reviewed journal Medical Hypotheses. The diet prescribes a program for weight loss and longevity based on SIRT1 gene activation. While calorie restriction in various forms has shown promise in clinical trials, evidence does not support long-term effects of this diet.

== Later life ==
In 2001, Laub was diagnosed with aggressive intravascular CNS large B cell lymphoma, which led to his retirement from active medical practice.

Laub resided in Redwood City, California, where he died on April 26, 2024, at the age of 89.
