= Make A Child Smile =

American children's charity website

Make A Child Smile Organization
- Company type: nonprofit 501(c)(3) charity
- Founded: May 17, 1998
- Headquarters: Clermont, Florida, {{{location_country}}}
- Founder: Alexandra d'Avila Bakker
- Website: www.makeachildsmile.org

The Make A Child Smile Organization, also known as MACS, was a source of support to children with chronic or life-threatening illnesses and their families, founded in May 1998 by Alexandra d'Avila Bakker. Emotional support was provided by creating the opportunity for people to visit the MACS website and learn about the children and their illnesses.

A picture and biography of children battling chronic illnesses were published on the website. Hundreds of 'net surfers, schools, service organizations, Scouting and church groups, used the MACS website as a philanthropic project, where they could send cards, letters and small gifts to the featured children and their siblings through postal mail to cheer them up during their difficult time.

Due to the lack of funding and staffing, Make A Child Smile closed down at the end of 2011, after 13½ years in operation.

Children featured on MACS and the mail they received

== In the news ==
MACS has been featured on many TV news broadcasts, magazines and newspapers, including:

- The Maury Povich Show
- Redbook
- Seventeen
- Nick Jr.
- Family Circle
