= Transforming Cleft =

Canada-based charity

- Predecessor: Transforming Faces
- Website: transformingcleft.org

Transforming Cleft is a Canadian-based charity that provides comprehensive cleft care for children born with cleft lip and palate.

== History ==
Jackie Elton, a UK-based businesswoman, and Jo Jamieson, a Canadian international development worker, founded the organization in Toronto, Ontario in 1999.

== Areas of operation ==
Transforming Cleft partners with local medical teams in: Argentina, Costa Rica, Chile, Ethiopia, India, Myanmar, Peru, Thailand, and Uganda.

== Financial information ==
Transforming Cleft is a registered Canadian charity with the Canada Revenue Agency.
