= Alliance for Smiles =

U.S.-based nonprofit organization

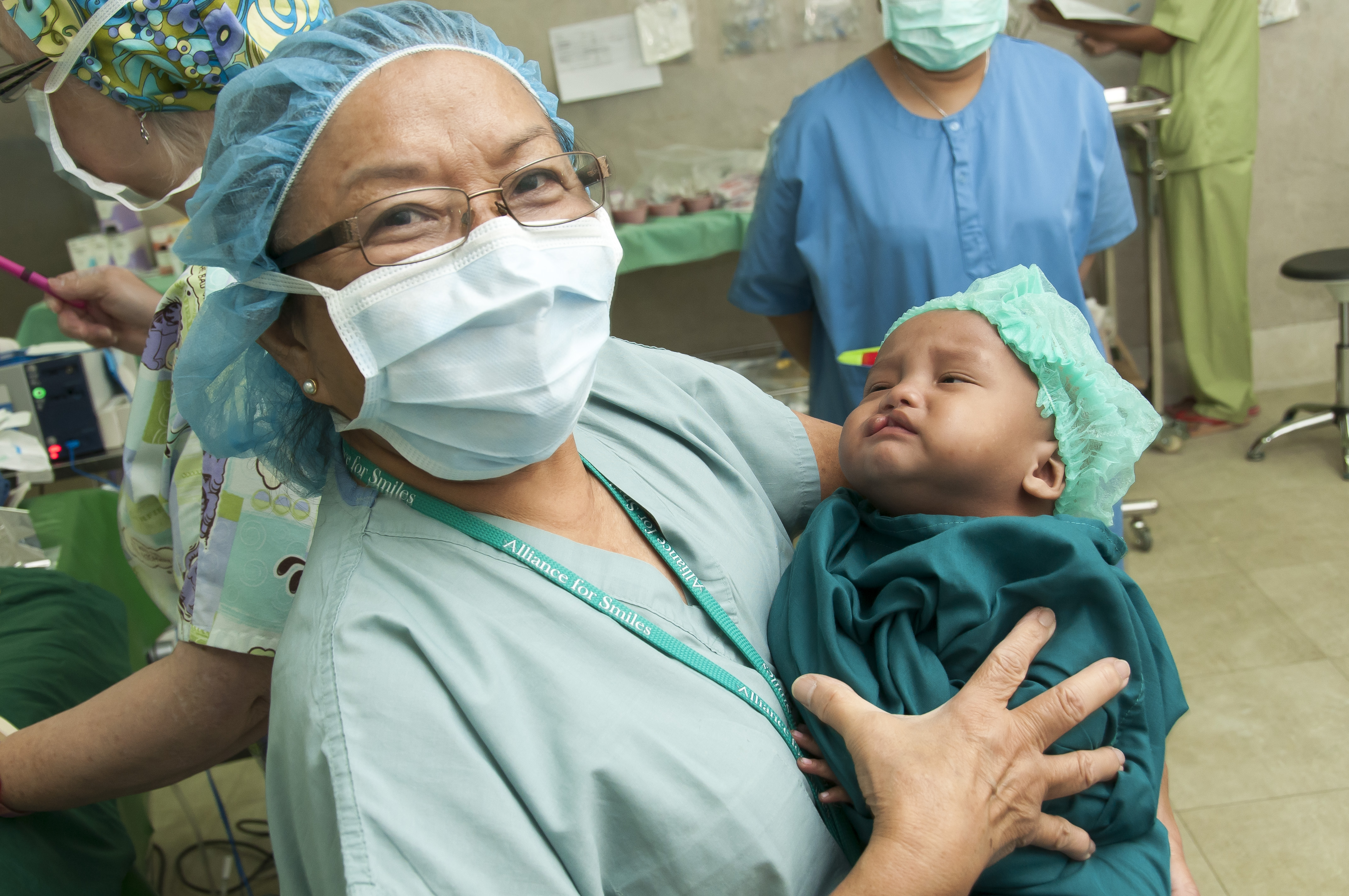
- Alliance for Smiles in Yangon, Myanmar preparing for surgery (2014)
- Formation: 2004; 22 years ago
- Founder: Anita Stangl; Burt Berry; James Patrick; Jim Deitz; John Goings; John Uth
- Type: Nonprofit
- Headquarters: San Francisco, California
- CEO: Jessica Hansen
- Board of Directors: Jessica Hansen; Karl Wustrack; Karin Vargervik; Rosemary Welde; Anita Stangl; Cecile Chiquette; Chih-Chen Fang; Tina Fischlin; Benjamin Lam; John O'Connor; Jim Patrick; Roderick Young; Jean Rosenblum
- Honorary Board Members: Sally Peterson-Falzone; Raphael "Raffi" Garcia III; Frank Yih; William Hoffman
- Staff: Jessica Hansen; Paul Vazquez; Jeremy Rhodes; Hayden Gubernick
- Website: https://www.allianceforsmiles.org

Alliance for Smiles (AfS) is a nonprofit organization founded in 2004 in San Francisco. They provide free surgical repairs for cleft lip and cleft palate, with missions mostly in the continents of Asia and Africa. They also work to develop treatment centers where continuous follow-up care can be provided.

== Early history ==
Alliance for Smiles was founded in October 2004 by Anita Stangl, Burt Berry, James Patrick, Jim Deitz, John Goings, and John Uth.

Karin Vargervik, previous director of the Craniofacial Center at the University of California San Francisco, was chosen to lead the AfS treatment center program, which aims to create international treatment centers that replicate the U.S. protocol of cleft treatment.

== Programs ==
Alliance for Smiles organizes international volunteer missions to provide cleft lip and cleft palate repair in under-served communities, manages programs to assist hot countries in reaching cleft lip and cleft palate repair self-sufficiency, and organizes an international medical fellowship program for pre-med students entering the medical field.

=== Surgical missions ===
Alliance for Smiles organizes two-week surgical missions to provide free cleft lip and palate surgery in various under-served countries. The team consists of about 12 medical professionals and 4 non-medical volunteers. During a typical mission, 70 to 100 children receive surgical care. The AfS team collaborates with local medical practitioners to communicate on proper medical procedures and to give follow-up treatment. Follow-up care is often required because a patient may need follow-up surgeries, orthodontic treatment, speech therapy, and other medical care.
