= Nokra Naval Base =

Soviet Naval base in the Red Sea

- 933 Пункт материально-технического обеспечения ВМФ СССР
- Dahlak Archipelago, Ethiopia
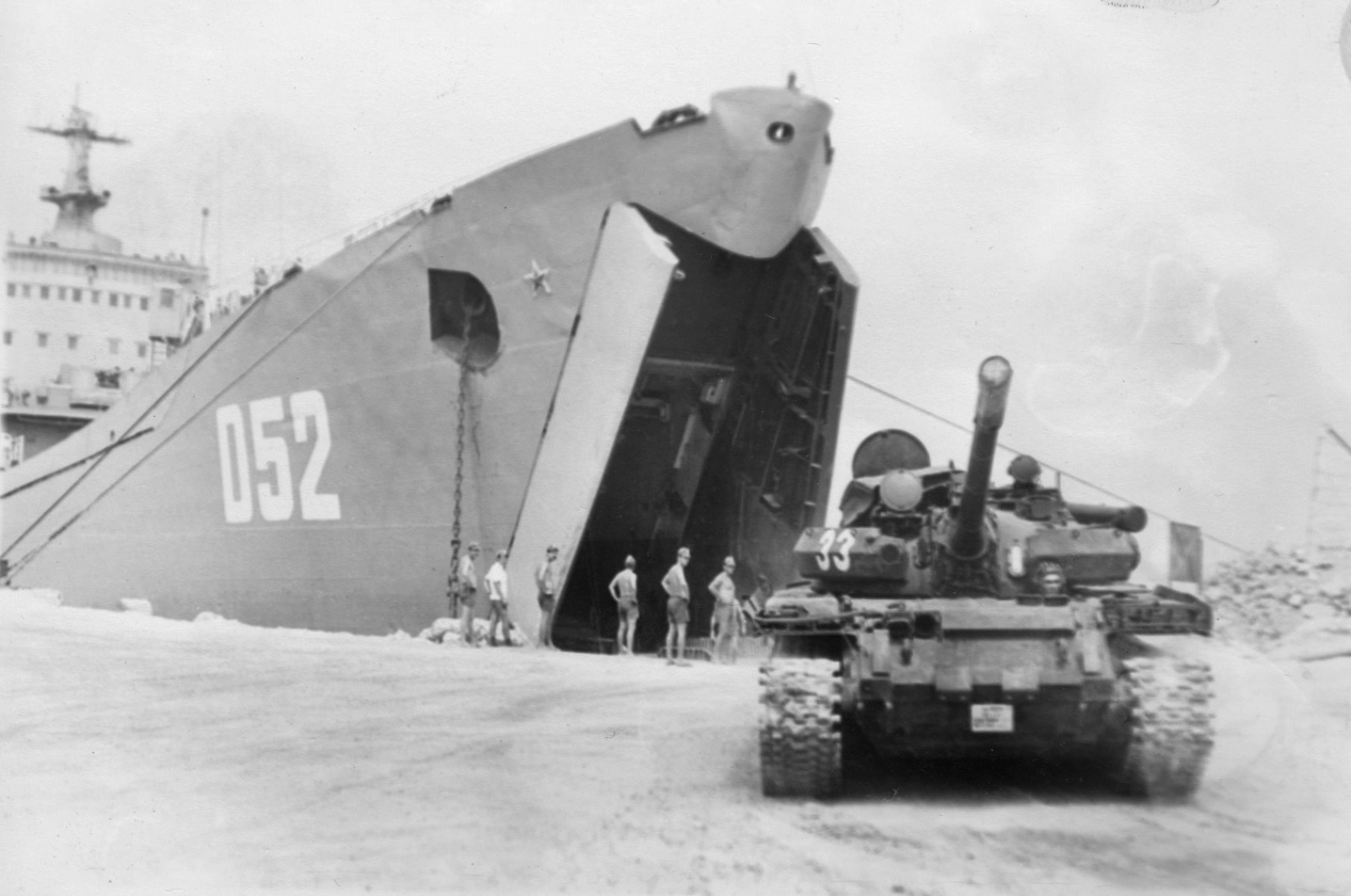
- Soviet Naval Infantry T-62 at the Nokra Naval Base

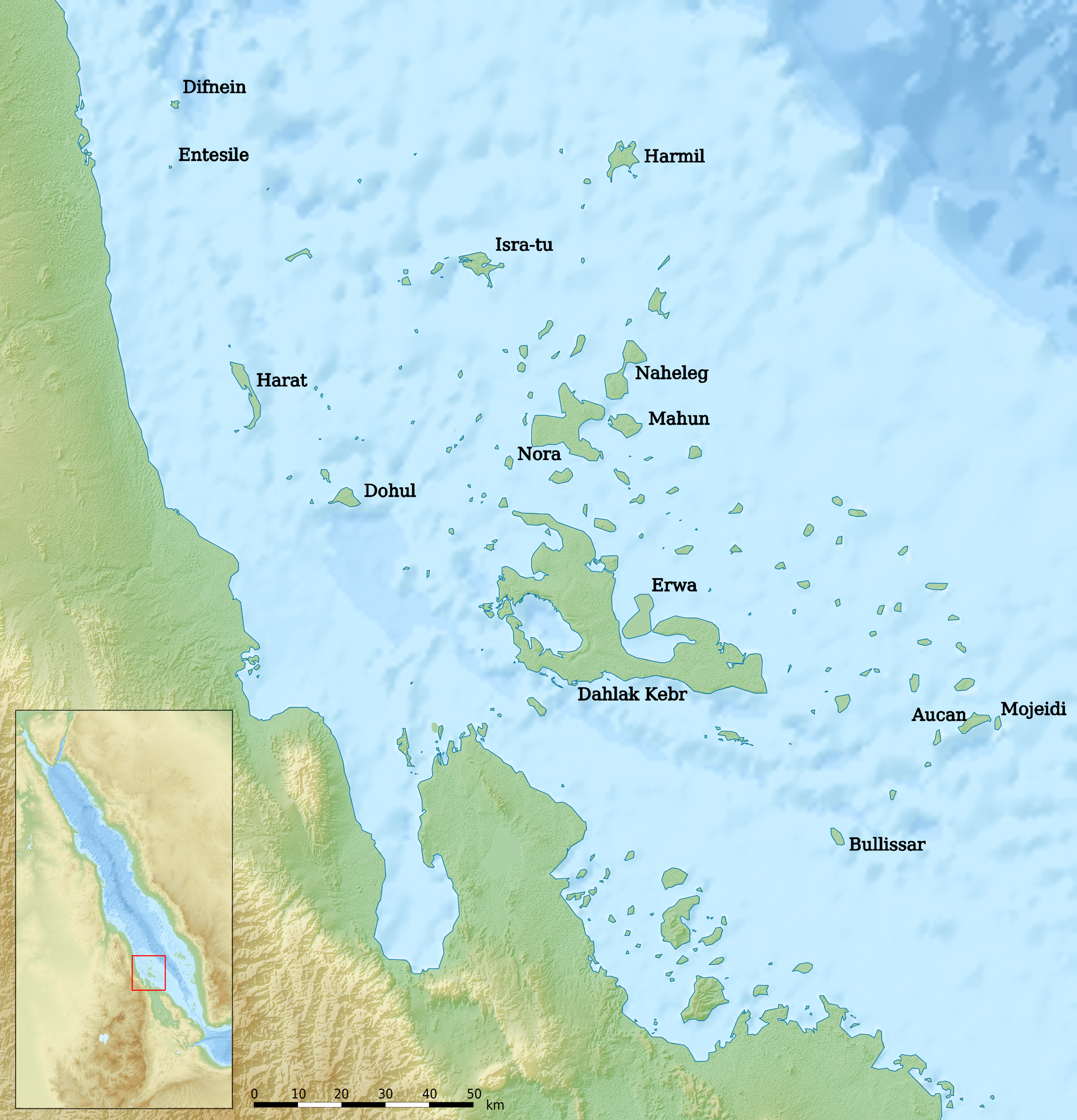
- Dahlak Archipelago

Site information
- Type: Military base
- Owner: Soviet Navy
- Condition: abandoned

Site history
- Built: 1977
- In use: 1977–1991

Nokra (Russian: 933 Пункт материально-технического обеспечения (ПМТО); 933rd Logistics support point (PMTO)) was a Soviet Navy Naval base on the island of Nokra of the Dahlak Archipelago in the Red Sea in Ethiopia (now Eritrea). It existed between 1977 and 1991.

== Origin ==
In 1977, during the war between Somalia and Ethiopia, the Soviet Union provided significant support to Ethiopia. As a result, the Somali government demanded that the USSR evacuate the Soviet naval base, which had existed since 1964, from the Somali port of Berbera within three days. At the same time, there was a need for a special support point in this area of the Indian Ocean for Soviet nuclear submarines and surface ships on duty.

In May 1977, during an official visit to Moscow, Ethiopian leader Mengistu Haile Mariam promised to provide the USSR with the Ethiopian port of Massawa as a naval base in exchange for military aid. However, Massawa was tightly blockaded by Eritrean separatists, and Ethiopia's second port, Assab, was too small and overloaded, handling all cargo entering the country. It was decided to locate the base on one of the islands of the Dahlak archipelago in the Red Sea – Nokra Island.

== Location ==
The Dahlak Archipelago is located in the southwestern Red Sea, separated from the African coast by the Massawa Strait. It consists of two large islands: Dahlak Kebir (approximately 750 km²) and Nora (approximately 130 km²), as well as more than 120 smaller ones, mostly uninhabited. The islands are surrounded by coral reefs.

During the base's operation, it was part of Ethiopia, but since 1993, it has been part of the newly formed state of Eritrea. During ancient Roman times, the archipelago was heavily populated and a center for pearl diving in the Red Sea. During the Italian occupation of Ethiopia, Nokra Island housed a large prison.

When planning the building of the base, a military delegation of experts was sent to Ethiopia to conduct reconnaissance. It was led by Admiral P. Navoytsev, First Deputy Chief of the Navy General Staff. The reconnaissance team included Yuri Nosov, the Navy's chief epidemiologist. One of the delegation members, Captain 1st Rank O. Dunayev, recalled:

Early in the morning, we departed for the archipelago... After circling over the lifeless patches of land scattered across the sea, we decided to land on the largest of the islands, Dahlak. It was a flat, pancake-like sandy surface, here and there raised by dunes and stunted groves of date palms. Under the Italians, there had been a penal colony here; even the remains of prison buildings and walls remained on the island. It was, frankly, a dismal place. We then decided to explore Nokra Island, where the rugged coastline and depths made it possible to install floating piers and a dock, as well as a floating workshop. In other words, this location was quite suitable. However, we secretly cherished the thought that once Massawa was liberated, the logistics center could be moved there. This confidence was reinforced by the concentration of a government landing division on the archipelago, preparing to seize the port. After informing the Ethiopians of the reconnaissance results and our choice, we returned to Moscow. There, I immediately began drafting an agreement that took into account all our needs, as well as amendments and suggestions from the local side. In early 1978, a delegation consisting of virtually the same members flew to Addis Ababa to sign the agreement.

— O. Dunayev

== Building and start of operations ==
In 1978, based on intergovernmental agreements, a logistics support point was established on Nokra Island in the Dahlak Archipelago. The base was initially designed for the repair of Soviet submarines operating in the Indian Ocean and was later converted to repair Soviet Navy ships. In the first half of 1978, the PD-66 dock was delivered to Dahlak.

For their successful transfer of the PD-66 dock to the Red Sea, Captain 2nd Rank V. Vasiliev, commander of the 162nd Rescue Vessel Division, and several members of the SS-21 rescue vessel crew were awarded the Order of the Red Star.

The PD-66 floating dock, with a lifting capacity of 8,500 tons, was located at the very mouth of Gubeit Mus Nefit Bay on Nokra Island. In 1980, the Black Sea Fleet's Separate Mobile Engineering Battalion of the Black sea fleet completed work to establish a base with power and water supply systems. The base also acquired berths (two of which were floating), a shore-based ship repair facility, fuel and water storage facilities, warehouses, a helipad, residential buildings for military personnel and their families, and social infrastructure facilities.

In addition to the floating dock, a repair ship arrived at Nokra, and together with the shore-based ship repair base, they began repairing incoming ships and vessels, their weapons, and technical equipment. Repair ships (from the Pacific and Black Sea Fleets) served at the base for 6–12 months at a time, rotating regularly. In addition to the repair ships, depot ships also served at Nokra for the same purposes. A number of auxiliary ships and vessels were also based there to service the base. For example, in 1988–1989, the following vessels were permanently stationed there:

- Diving boat (Black Sea Fleet)
- pontoon boat "MBSS-219" (Pacific Fleet)
- tugboat
- water tanker "MVT-23" (Pacific Fleet)
- storage vessel (food) "SKh-500"
- fireboat No. 245 (Black Sea Fleet)
- sea diving boat "VM-416" (Black Sea Fleet)
- tugboat No. 350 (Pacific Fleet)
- oil skimmer vessel (Pacific Fleet)

Water and fuel were delivered by the tankers Olekma and Sheksna (from the Baltic Fleet), Boris Butoma (Pacific Fleet), food was delivered by the refrigerator ship Karadag (Kerch), cargo was delivered by the transports Armenia (Nakhodka), Ufa (Sevastopol), and Vasily Golovnin (Sevastopol).

Medical care for the base's personnel was provided once or twice a year by the hospital ships Ob (Pacific Fleet) and Yenisei (Black Sea Fleet).

Attention was also paid to ensuring the base's security. In February 1980, large landing ships with hull numbers 083 and 075 arrived at Nokra to guard the PMTO, delivering a unit of Pacific Fleet naval infantry with heavy weapons, including tanks, armored personnel carriers, and Shilka SPAAG. Subsequently, marines (sometimes from the Black Sea Fleet) would periodically rotate in and out, approximately every six months. To support them, landing ships and tank landing ships were stationed here, for example Ropucha-class. From February 1985 until the base's abandonment, combat groups of the Black Sea Fleet's PDSS provided counter-sabotage support for the base, rotating every 9 to 10 months. To protect the base from the separatist fleet, one artillery boat was permanently stationed on Nokra Island from June 1988 until the base's abandonment in February 1991.

== Base operations ==
Almost all Soviet Navy ships serving in the Red Sea and Persian Gulf docked for repairs and cleaning. In addition to Soviet and Ethiopian ships, a torpedo boat of the Seychelles Navy was also repaired in 1988.

The base also served submarines of the Pacific Fleet and Northern Fleet, which had been on months-long combat missions in the Arabian Sea since February 1979. In April 1980, the first nuclear-powered submarine, K-108 arrived at the base, commanded by Captain 1st Rank V.L. Ratnikov, for anti-aircraft and preventive maintenance. In the fall of 1980, repairs were carried out on the Project 671 nuclear-powered submarine K-369 after its retractable devices struck the superstructure of the tanker Akhtuba (formerly Peking) while on the surface.

The base was originally created to service submarines, but with the worsening situation in the area due to the civil war in Eritrea, their visits ceased in 1988.

In addition to the floating dock "PD-66", the Nokra base was serviced by repair ships (all Project 304 ships built in Poland) and submarine tenders (all Project 1886 ships). These vessels typically stayed at the Nokra base for a year at a time, rotating through the base.

In July 1980, the Nokra base was visited by the Commander-in-Chief of the Soviet Navy Sergey Gorshkov.

In August 1984, the base was visited by a detachment of Soviet Navy ships sweeping the Red Sea to remove mines laid by an "Al-Jihad" organisation, laid as a protest against the "imperialist" support of the Iran-Iraq War. The detachment included the Leningrad helicopter carrier, Krasny Krym destroyer, Tapir-class landing ship "Ilya Azarov", Natya class minesweepers "Kontr-Admiral Khoroshkin", "Dizelist", "Zenitchik" and the "Vladimir Kolechitsky" tanker.

The navigational situation in the Dahlak Archipelago and the Nokra logistics base was challenging. Here, just offshore, were numerous small, uninhabited islands, and underwater hazards lurked—reefs, shoals, and rocky banks. Furthermore, a half-submerged Italian hospital ship from World War II lay on its side not far from the base. All this complicated navigation and led to several incidents.

Additionally, there was a radiation incident:

On September 29, 1985, during maintenance of the K-175 nuclear submarine, due to improper actions of the personnel, the reactor cores depressurized, leading to a sharp deterioration in the radiation level in the reactor compartment. The emergency protection systems for both reactors were reset. As a result of the incident, 137 people were affected. Radiation monitoring in the area of the accident continued for several more years, without disclosing the accident.

In May 1988 and March 1989, Starshina of radiochemists of the depot ship "Ivan Kolyshkin" Tsiganiy A.I. participated in the implementation of radiation monitoring:

As radiochemists, we collected about 10 samples of soil, plants, and water. When we examined them, we found faint traces of radioisotopes of iodine and strontium, characteristic of a nuclear reactor. We were looking for something completely different. We didn't know about the accident at the time, and when we were taking samples, we were told that the French might have used tactical nuclear weapons in the war in Chad, and we were looking for traces of their use. We conducted similar studies in March on our return journey.

— Tsiganiy A.I.

== Military operations in the Red Sea near the Nokra base ==
In March 1988, at the town of Afabet (56 km northeast of Keren), Eritrean rebels inflicted a major defeat on the Ethiopian army, encircling and destroying approximately three infantry divisions and some motorized units. From that moment on, the rebel Eritrean People's Liberation Front (EPLF) and Tigray People's Liberation Front (TPLF) firmly established control over most of the provinces of Eritrea and Tigray.

At the same time, the rebels intensified military operations in the coastal waters of the Red Sea. Initially, the separatist fleet consisted of small motorboats with a crew of three, equipped with a wide variety of weapons: American 107mm recoilless rifles, Browning heavy machine guns, and tubes from Soviet Grad rocket launchers. The rebels then acquired larger Swedish-built boats with 40mm artillery and machine guns.

At midnight on April 18, 1988, an Eritrean separatist motorboat shelled the port of Assab and its only oil refinery, killing five and wounding 15. An Ethiopian naval vessel destroyed the boat.

On May 31, 1988, in the North Massawa Strait, separatist speedboats fired on the Baltic Fleet tanker Olekma, en route from the Persian Gulf to its home base after nearly six months of operations in the region. A. A. Lemeshko, who worked as a radio operator on the ship, recalled:

I looked out the porthole and saw grenades flying. Then—a roar. I ran to the radio room. I dodged bullets. I wasn't afraid—I was just very anxious when the political officer ran for his pistol. The radio station's chief, Mikhail Grigorievich Novikov, lay dead near the radio room. All he had managed to do before dying was shout "Help!" a few times. A fire started. The captain ordered to open radio operation—and I, covered in fire extinguisher foam, began transmitting: "The "Olyokma" had been attacked by unknown boats, the radio station's chief had died!" I spent fourteen hours in the radio room!

— Radio operator A. A. Lemeshko

To protect shipping in the Red Sea, a gunboat with two crews was permanently stationed at the Nokra base since June 1988. In February 1989, the Black Sea Fleet search and rescue vessel Baskunchak towed the Project 205P gunboat AK-312 from the 165th Anti-Submarine Ship Division of the 141st Brigade of Waterway Guard Ships to the Nokra base. In August 1990, it was replaced by the Project 1124 ship "Komsomolets Moldavii", which arrived from Sevastopol. Around the same time, the Project 206M hydrofoil boat T-72 (bort number 353), commanded by Andrei Prokopchik, arrived. A cutter belonging to the Baltic Fleet independently completed the voyage from the port of Świnoujście (Poland) to Nokra Island. The cutter remained at the base until February 1991, was the last to leave the archipelago, and provided cover for the convoy of ships all the way to Aden.

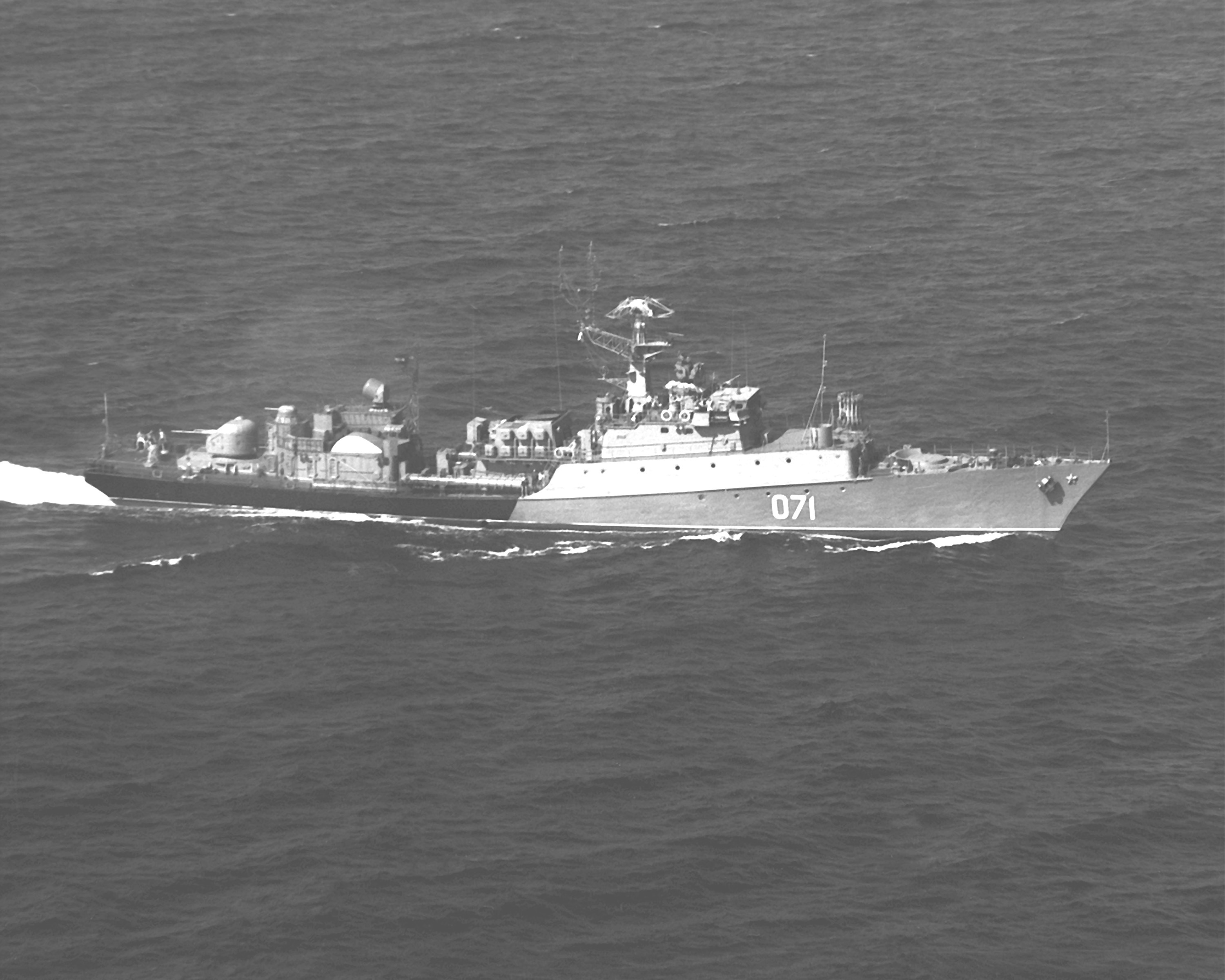
Komsomolets Moldavii on August 1, 1990

During the operation of the Nokra base, Soviet Navy warships in the nearby sector of the Red Sea conducted several independent or joint operations with the Ethiopian armed forces, as well as repelling attacks by rebel naval forces:

- On November 20, 1977, an amphibious landing was carried out in Mogadishu, the capital of Somalia, to evacuate the Soviet embassy and a group of Soviet citizens.
- In January 1977 several western newspapers claimed that the Project 56 destroyer "Veskiy" shelled Eritrean positions near Massawa. The claim was based on a EPLF press release and the crew of the destroyer years later refuted these statements.
- In the summer of 1978, a Pacific Fleet marine tank platoon landed in the port of Massawa, sustaining no losses and enabling Ethiopian forces to capture the port and city.
- On May 13, 1990, the Natya-class minesweeper Razvedchik repelled an attack by four Eritrean boats on the Soviet tanker "International"; one of the boats was sunk.
- On May 27, 1990, the AK-312 repelled two attacks by four Eritrean boats, sinking three of them before safely returning to base.
- In October 1990, the MPK-118 Komsomolets Moldavii (Project 1124M) suppressed two Eritrean batteries firing at it from the shore with artillery fire and destroyed an ammunition depot.
- On December 10, 1990, Eritrean separatists fired on the tanker Sheksna. The accompanying minesweeper Paravan provided cover for the tanker and repelled the attackers.
- In December 1990, the minesweeper Dizelist sank two of the six Eritrean boats that attacked it.

In February 1990, Eritreans stormed the city and port of Massawa, cutting off Ethiopia's access to the sea, and Ethiopian warships and vessels relocated to Nokra. From that moment on, the base and the surrounding waters came under systematic shelling from Eritrean shore batteries.

== Base evacuation ==
The year 1990 was characterized by an escalation of the military conflict in Ethiopia. Higher command, represented by Rear Admiral Valery Sergeyev, Chief of Staff of the 8th Operational Squadron, and Admiral Igor Makhonin, Chief of Logistics of the Soviet Navy, were present at various times at the base, monitoring and coordinating the situation. However, constant missile and artillery attacks on the base and its support convoys, along with the de facto military blockade of Nokra Island, significantly complicated the Soviet Navy's use of the base for its intended purpose. Forced participation in combat, the threat of an amphibious landing, and the possible capture of the island predetermined the further involvement of the base, the ships of the 85th Operational Surface Ship Brigade, and the battalion of marines in a larger armed conflict, which was not part of the plans of the General Staff of the Soviet Navy or Soviet foreign policy. On February 6, 1991, the Commander-in-Chief of the Soviet Navy ordered the "withdrawal of all USSR Navy forces from Nokra Island in the Dahlak Archipelago to avoid separatist attack." The evacuation began at noon that same day. Within six hours, the PM-129 received and accommodated the personnel of the base, the PD-66 dock, an air defense platoon, and a naval infantry unit, along with their belongings, documents, and weapons. At 5:14 PM, the USSR national flag was lowered from the base flagpole. That evening, as dusk fell, all ships and vessels departed the piers. All equipment and property of the base became the property of the Ethiopian state.

On the night of February 12, 1991, an order was received to leave the bay. The ships and vessels began moving sequentially out of the bay and then independently to a point beyond Ethiopian territorial waters. The withdrawal of the ships and vessels was carried out as part of convoy "KON-63". The last to depart was "PM-129", towing the non-self-propelled storage vessel "SKh-500", which later picked up the self-propelled barge "MBSS-219" along the way. This marked the end of the Soviet presence at the 933rd PMTO, the Soviet Navy base in the Red Sea on the Dahlak Archipelago, Nokra Island, and in Ethiopia.

The convoy continued to the port of Aden in the Republic of Yemen. The voyage was carried out in difficult hydrometeorological conditions, during which the uncrewed barge MBSS-219, which had a fire engine on board, sank in the Gulf of Aden. Upon arrival at the port of Aden, the convoy ceased to exist and each ship received an individual plan for further action from the 8th operational squadron.

The personnel of the Nokra base and its assigned forces were transported by PM-129 to the port of Vladivostok in March 1991, where they were disbanded. PD-66 sank in its designated location due to the Ethiopian side's failure to organize its operation and maintenance.

With the fall of the Ethiopian regime and the end of the armed conflict, the base lost its significance and was abandoned and fell into disrepair. Some of the technically faulty Ethiopian ships and vessels, left at the base without proper maintenance, sank in their moorings.

As of 2009, Nokra Island and the abandoned base were a tourist attraction for diving enthusiasts.

== Base commanders ==
- Captain 1st Rank V. A. Plyasheshnik, 1981–1984
- Captain 1st Rank Sakun, 1987 (PD-66 commander)
- Captain 1st Rank V. G. Kukhar, 1988–1990
- Captain 1st Rank B. G. Plenkov, 1990
- Captain 1st Rank A. Vyalov, 1990–1991
