= German–Soviet Boundary and Friendship Treaty =

1939 secret addition to the Molotov–Ribbentrop Pact

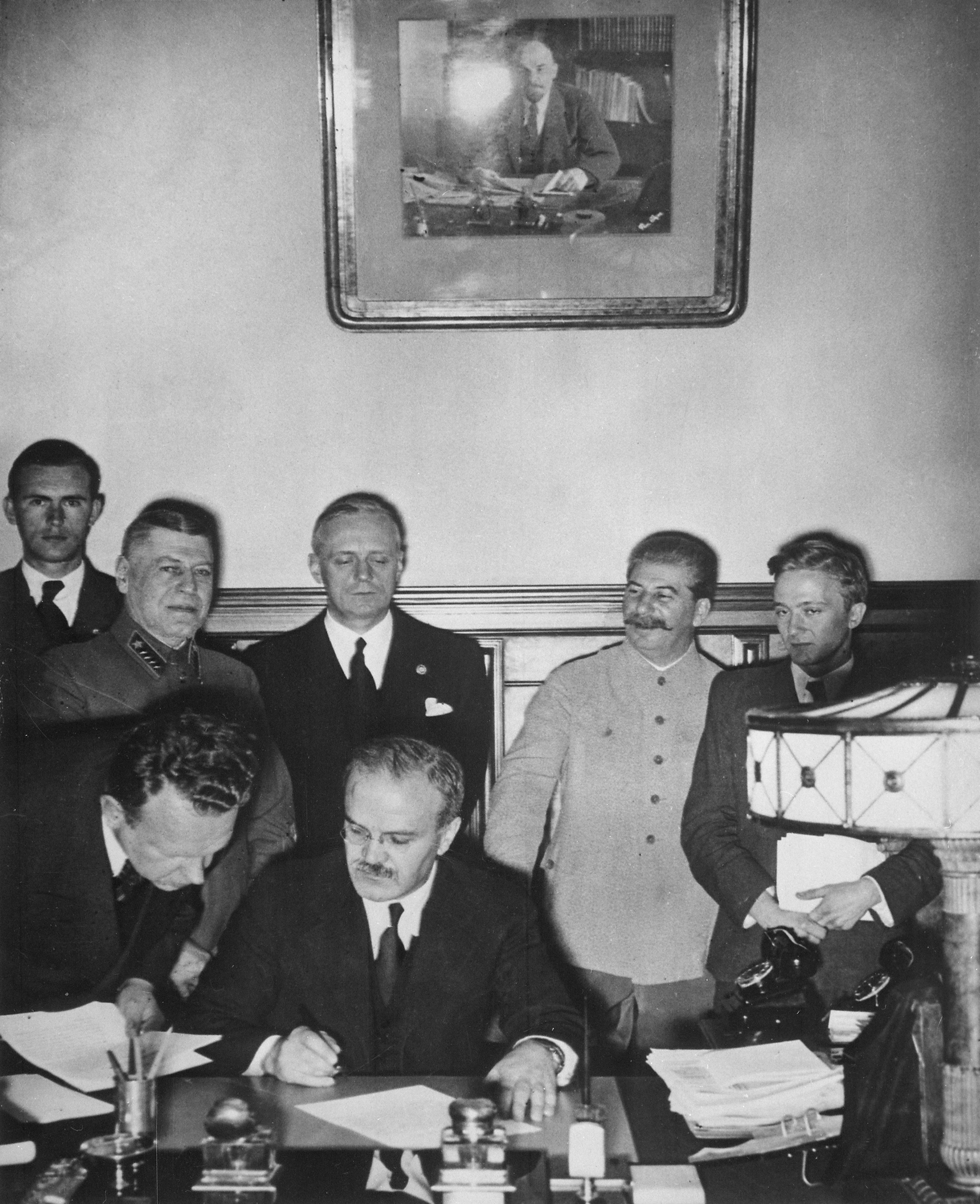
- Soviet Foreign Minister Vyacheslav Molotov signs the German–Soviet Pact in Moscow, 28 September 1939; behind him are Richard Schulze-Kossens (Ribbentrop's adjutant), Boris Shaposhnikov (Red Army Chief of Staff), Joachim von Ribbentrop, Joseph Stalin, Vladimir Pavlov (Soviet translator). Alexey Shkvarzev (Soviet ambassador in Berlin), stands next to Molotov.

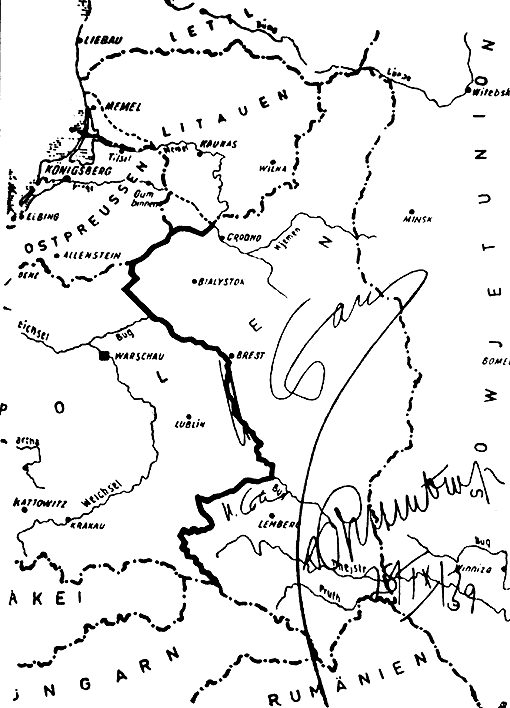
- Map attached to the German–Soviet Treaty dividing Poland into German and Soviet occupation zones, bearing the signatures of Stalin and Ribbentrop

The German–Soviet Boundary and Friendship Treaty was a second supplementary protocol of the Molotov–Ribbentrop Pact of 23 August 1939. It was a secret clause as amended on 28 September 1939 by Nazi Germany and the Soviet Union after their joint invasion and occupation of sovereign Poland. It was signed by Joachim von Ribbentrop and Vyacheslav Molotov, the foreign ministers of Germany and the Soviet Union respectively, in the presence of Joseph Stalin. Only a small portion of the protocol, which superseded the first treaty, was publicly announced, while the spheres of influence of Nazi Germany and the Soviet Union remained secret. The third secret protocol of the Pact was signed on 10 January 1941 by Friedrich Werner von Schulenburg and Molotov, in which Germany renounced its claims on a part of Lithuania, west of the Šešupė river. Only a few months after this, Germany started its invasion of the Soviet Union.

== Secret articles ==
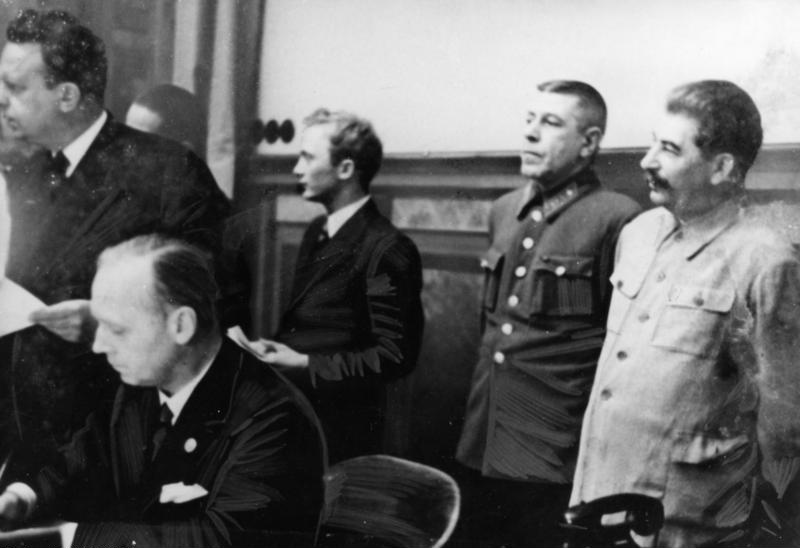
German Foreign Minister Joachim von Ribbentrop signs the German–Soviet Pact, 28 September 1939

Several secret articles were attached to the treaty. These articles allowed for the exchange of Soviet and German nationals between the two occupied zones of Poland, redrew parts of the central European spheres of interest dictated by the Molotov–Ribbentrop Pact, and also stated that neither party to the treaty would allow on its territory any "Polish agitation" directed at the other party.

During the western invasion of Poland, the German Wehrmacht had taken control of the Lublin Voivodeship and eastern Warsaw Voivodeship, territories that the Molotov–Ribbentrop Pact had accorded in the Soviet sphere of influence. To compensate the Soviets for that "loss", the treaty's secret attachment transferred Lithuania to the Soviet sphere of influence except for a small territory, which was referred to as the "Lithuania Strip", the left bank of the Šešupė River, and was to remain a German sphere of influence.

== Aftermath ==
The Soviet Union signed a Mutual Assistance Treaty with Estonia on September 28, with Latvia on October 5, and with Lithuania on October 10, 1939. The treaties obliged both parties to respect each other's sovereignty and independence, and allowed the Soviet government to establish military bases in the territory of the three respective Baltic countries. Once established, these Soviet military bases facilitated the full-scale Soviet invasion and occupation of the Baltic countries in June 1940.

According to provisions outlined in the October 10, 1939 Soviet–Lithuanian Mutual Assistance Treaty, Lithuania also acquired about one fifth of the Vilnius Region, including Lithuania's historical capital, Vilnius. The mutual assistance treaties allowed for the 1940 Soviet occupation of the Baltic states and was described by The New York Times as a "virtual sacrifice of independence".
