= Russian hospital ship Irtysh =

Russian Navy hospital ship

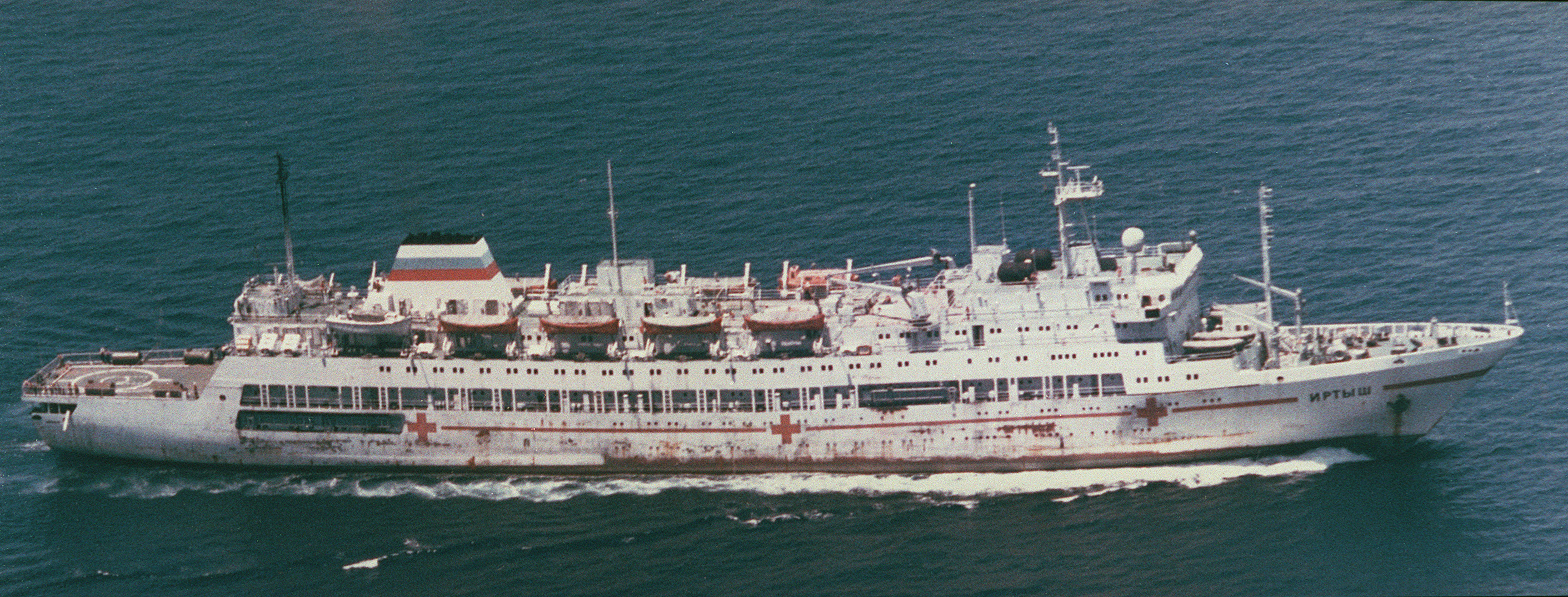
- Irtysh underway on 1 July 1994

History

→ Russia
- Name: Irtysh; (Иртыш)
- Namesake: Irtysh
- Owner: Russian Navy
- Ordered: January 1981
- Builder: Adolf Barsky, Szczecin
- Laid down: 25 November 1988
- Launched: 6 July 1989
- Commissioned: 31 July 1990
- Home port: Vladivostok
- Identification: IMO number: 8956499
- Status: Active

General characteristics
- Class & type: Ob-class hospital ship
- Displacement: Standard: 11,300 tons
- Length: 145.7 m (478 ft)
- Beam: 19.6 m (64 ft)
- Draft: 6.2 m (20 ft)
- Speed: 19.8 knots (36.7 km/h; 22.8 mph)
- Range: 11,600 nmi (21,500 km; 13,300 mi) at 14 kn (26 km/h; 16 mph)
- Boats & landing craft carried: 10 lifeboats
- Troops: 300-450 patients
- Complement: 207 crew
- Aircraft carried: 1 x Kamov Ka-25
- Aviation facilities: Helipad and hangar

Irtysh is a Russian Navy hospital ship of the Ob-class. Irtysh is part of the Pacific Fleet.

== Development ==
The four ships of the Ob-class hospital ships were designed to provide medical and recreational facilities. They were also employed as personnel transports. They have civilian crews but carry uniformed naval medical personnel. The ships are fully equipped with surgical equipment. Later two units are Project B-320 II, implying a modification to the basic design; the external differences are minor.

== Construction and career ==
She was laid down on 25 November 1988 and launched on 6 July 1989 by Adolf Barsky shipyard. Commissioned on 31 July 1990 as a hospital ship.

In 2016, the modernization of the Irtysh's equipment began, the first phase of which was completed in August. She went under modernization again with telemedicine equipment in 2017.

The objectives of Irtysh now are receiving, distributing, providing medical assistance to the wounded, sick and injured in peacetime or during hostilities. Evacuation of victims from ships and vessels. Organization of events for the rest of crews of ships and submarines at sea.

== Gallery ==
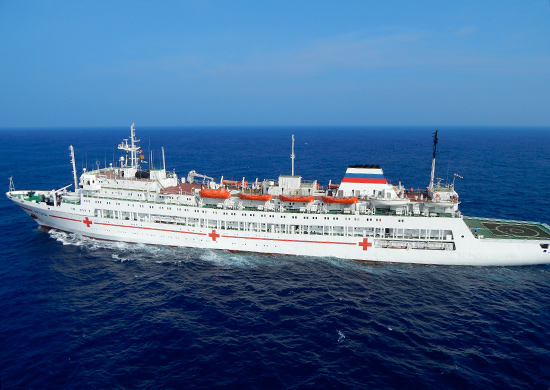
Aerial view of Irtysh underway on 1 January 1994.

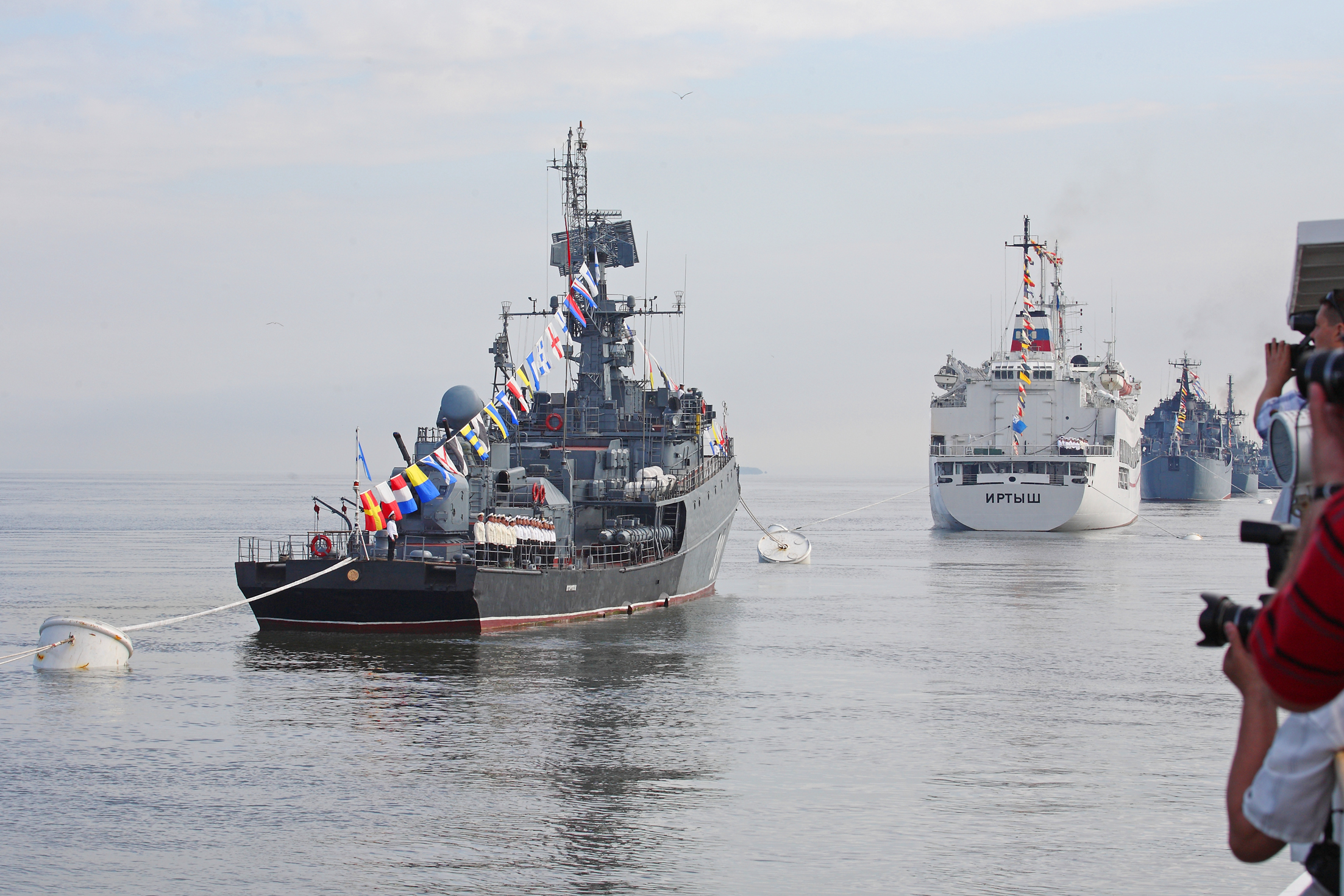
Aft view of Irtysh on 26 July 2009

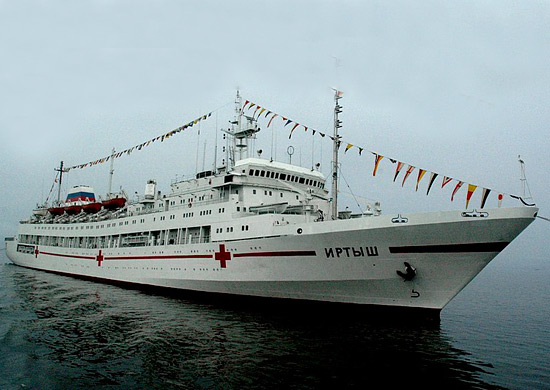
Irtysh on 10 September 2013

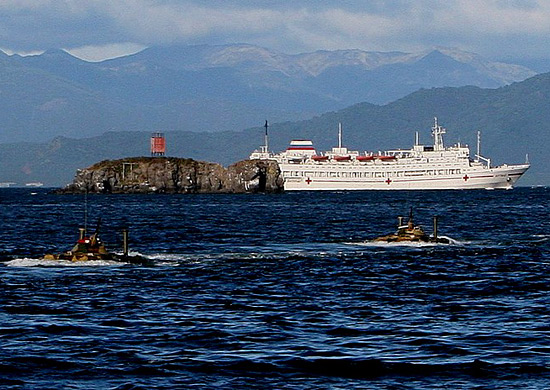
Irtysh in the background on 10 September 2013

Irtysh on 1 May 2016

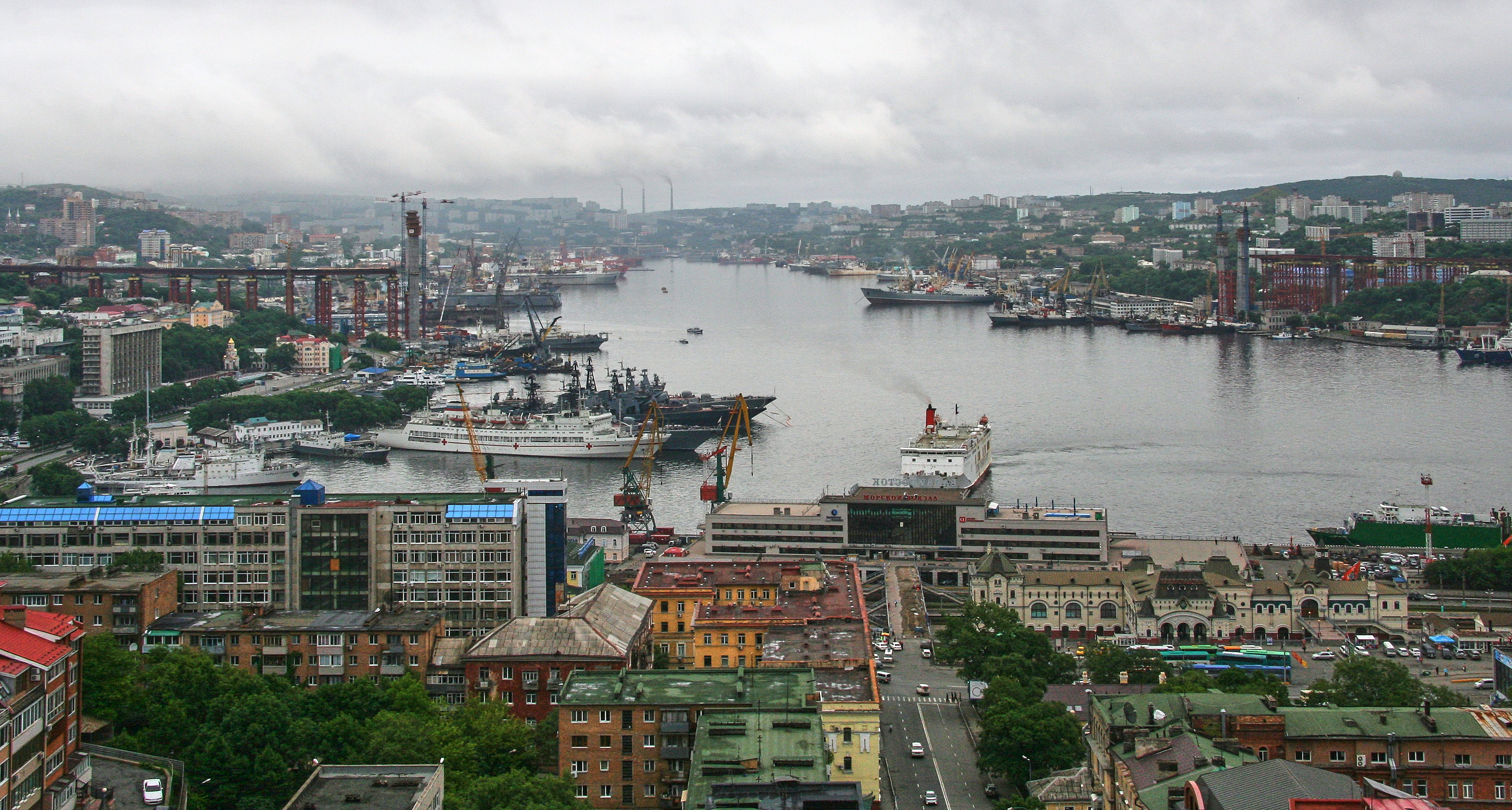
Vladivostok bridge under construction with Irtysh in the foreground on 10 July 2010

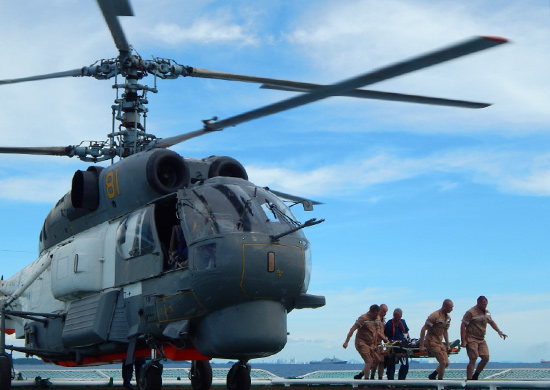
A Ka-27 helicopter landing aboard Irtysh with its crew bringing a patient inside the ship on 13 January 2017

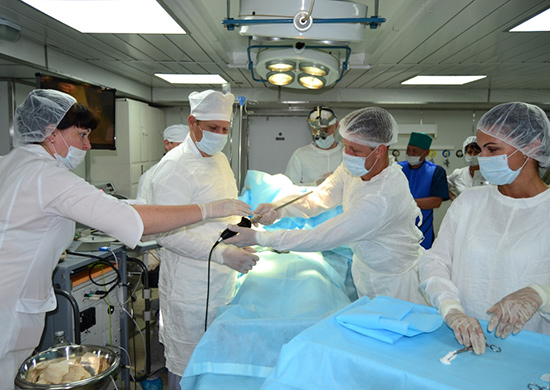
Operating room of Irtysh on 13 January 2017
