= Russian hospital ship Svir =

Russian Navy hospital ship

History

→ Russia
- Name: Svir; (Свирь)
- Namesake: Svir
- Owner: Russian Navy
- Ordered: January 1981
- Builder: Adolf Barsky, Szczecin
- Laid down: 1987
- Launched: 1988
- Commissioned: 1989
- Home port: Severomorsk
- Identification: IMO number: 8956487
- Status: Active

General characteristics
- Class & type: Ob-class hospital ship
- Displacement: Standard: 11,300 tons
- Length: 145.7 m (478 ft)
- Beam: 19.6 m (64 ft)
- Draft: 6.2 m (20 ft)
- Speed: 19.8 knots (36.7 km/h; 22.8 mph)
- Range: 11,600 nmi (21,500 km; 13,300 mi) at 14 kn (26 km/h; 16 mph)
- Boats & landing craft carried: 10 lifeboats
- Troops: 300-450 patients
- Complement: 207 crew
- Aircraft carried: 1 x Kamov Ka-25
- Aviation facilities: Helipad and hangar

Svir is a Russian Navy hospital ship of the Ob-class. Svir is part of the Northern Fleet.

== Development ==
The four Ob-class hospital ships were designed to provide medical and recreational facilities. They were also employed as personnel transports. They have civilian crews but carry uniformed naval medical personnel. The ships are fully equipped with surgical equipment. Later two units are Project B-320 II, implying a modification to the basic design; the external differences are minor.

== Construction and career ==
She was laid down in 1987 and launched in 1988 by Adolf Barsky shipyard. Commissioned in 1989 as a hospital ship.

Svir participated in long voyages to Cuba in 1990, Angola in 1992, and a serious fire occurred aboard Svir which resulted in 3 deaths and damages to the ship on 10 March 1999 as she was moored in Murmansk.

Svir took journalists to the wreak site of the sunken Kursk submarine between 24 and 29 September 2000. She provided medical support during the expedition to raise the sunken Kursk in 2001.
