= Ob-class hospital ship =

Russian Navy hospital ships

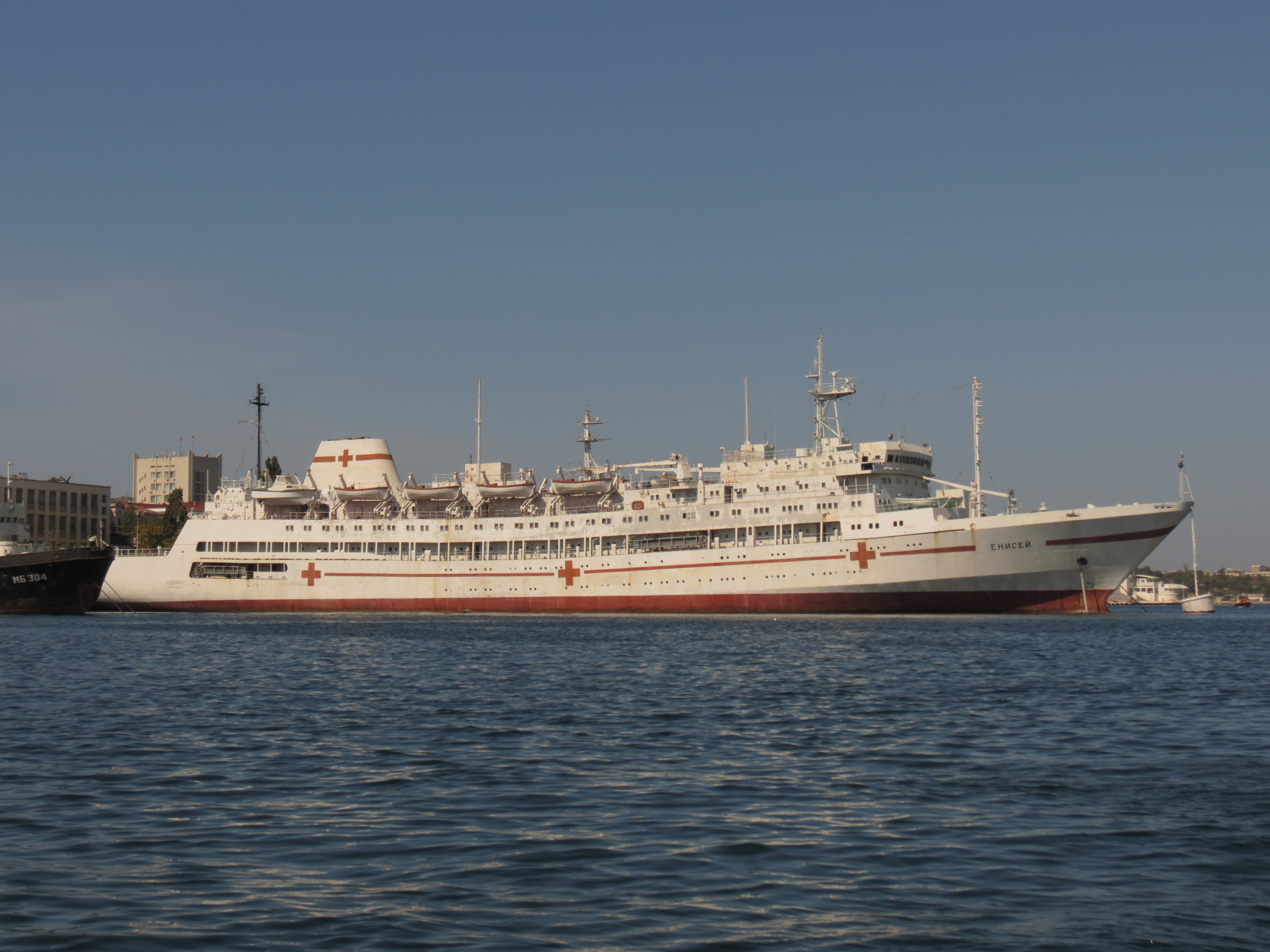
- Yenisey moored in Sevastopol on 14 September 2012.

Class overview
- Name: Ob
- Builders: Adolf Warski Shipyard, Poland
- Operators: Soviet Navy; Russian Navy
- Built: 1978-1988
- In service: 1980-1990
- Planned: 5
- Completed: 4
- Canceled: 1
- Active: 3

General characteristics
- Type: Hospital ship
- Displacement: Standard: 11,300 tons
- Length: 145.7 m (478 ft 0 in)
- Beam: 19.6 m (64 ft 4 in)
- Draft: 6.2 m (20 ft 4 in)
- Propulsion: Zgoda-Sulzer 12ZV40 / 48 diesels; 78,000 hp (58,000 kW)
- Speed: 19.8 knots (36.7 km/h; 22.8 mph)
- Range: 11,600 nmi (21,500 km; 13,300 mi) at 14 kn (26 km/h; 16 mph)
- Boats & landing craft carried: 10 lifeboats
- Troops: 300–450 patients
- Complement: 207 crew
- Aircraft carried: 1 x Kamov Ka-25
- Aviation facilities: Helipad and hangar

The Ob class, Soviet designation Project 320, was a class of Soviet Navy hospital ships active in the 1980s. The ships are Ob, Yenisey, Svir and Irtysh.

After the dissolution of the Soviet Union in 1991, the ships became the property of the Russian government, but no sources indicate how the Russian Navy made use of the ships.

== Development ==
The four ships of the Ob-class hospital ships were designed to provide medical and recreational facilities. They were also employed as personnel transports. They have civilian crews but carry uniformed naval medical personnel. The ships are fully equipped with surgical equipment. Later two units are Project 320 II, implying a modification to the basic design; the external differences are minor.

Hospital ship Ob was decommissioned in 1997 and was scrapped at Alang in 2007.

=== Project 320 ===
- Ob (1980-1997)
- Yenisey (1981)

=== Project 320 II ===
- Svir (1989)
- Irtysh (1990)

== Characteristics ==
The size of the crew when deployed was nominally 124 sailors and 83 members of the medical staff. The on-board hospital has 300 beds, or in the event of an emergency (e.g. evacuation) for a short time up to 650 passengers. There are more than ten therapeutic and diagnostic departments, three operating rooms and one pharmacy. The ship does not carry armaments. At the stern is a landing area and hangar for one search and rescue helicopter type Kamov Ka-25PS or Ka-27PS. The propulsion system consists of two Zgoda-Sulzer 12ZV40 / 48 diesels, each with an output of 7800 hp, driving two propellers. The top speed reaches 19 knots. The range is 10,000 nautical miles at a speed of 16 knots.

== Ship of class ==
Name	Laid Down	Launched	Commissioned	Decommissioned	Status
Ob	17 August 1978	12 April 1979	28 March 1980	16 August 1997	Broken up on 13 March 2007
Yenisey	10 September 1979	4 April 1980	31 January 1981		Active
Svir	1987	1988	5 June 1989		Active
Irtysh	25 November 1988	6 July 1989	31 July 1990		Active
					Cancelled

== Gallery ==
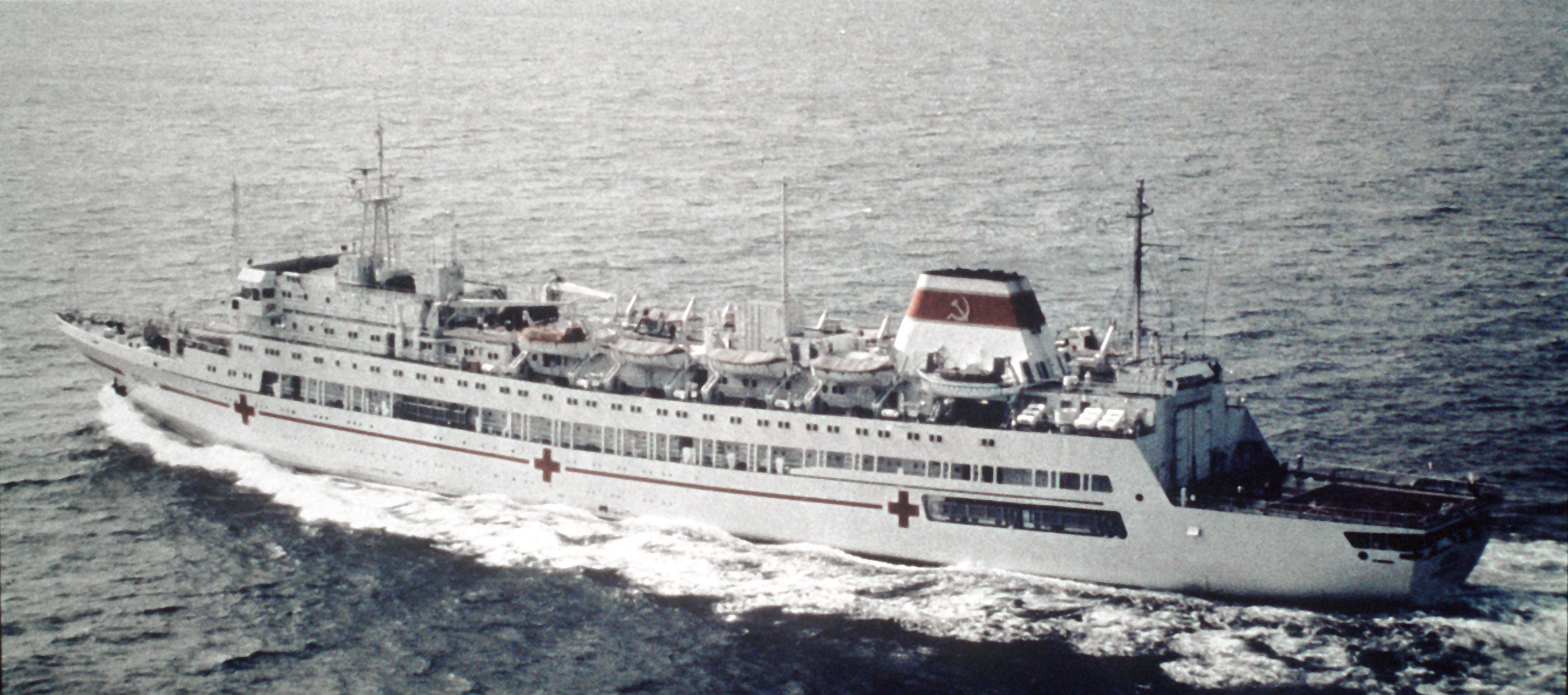
Aerial view of Ob underway on 1 April 1982

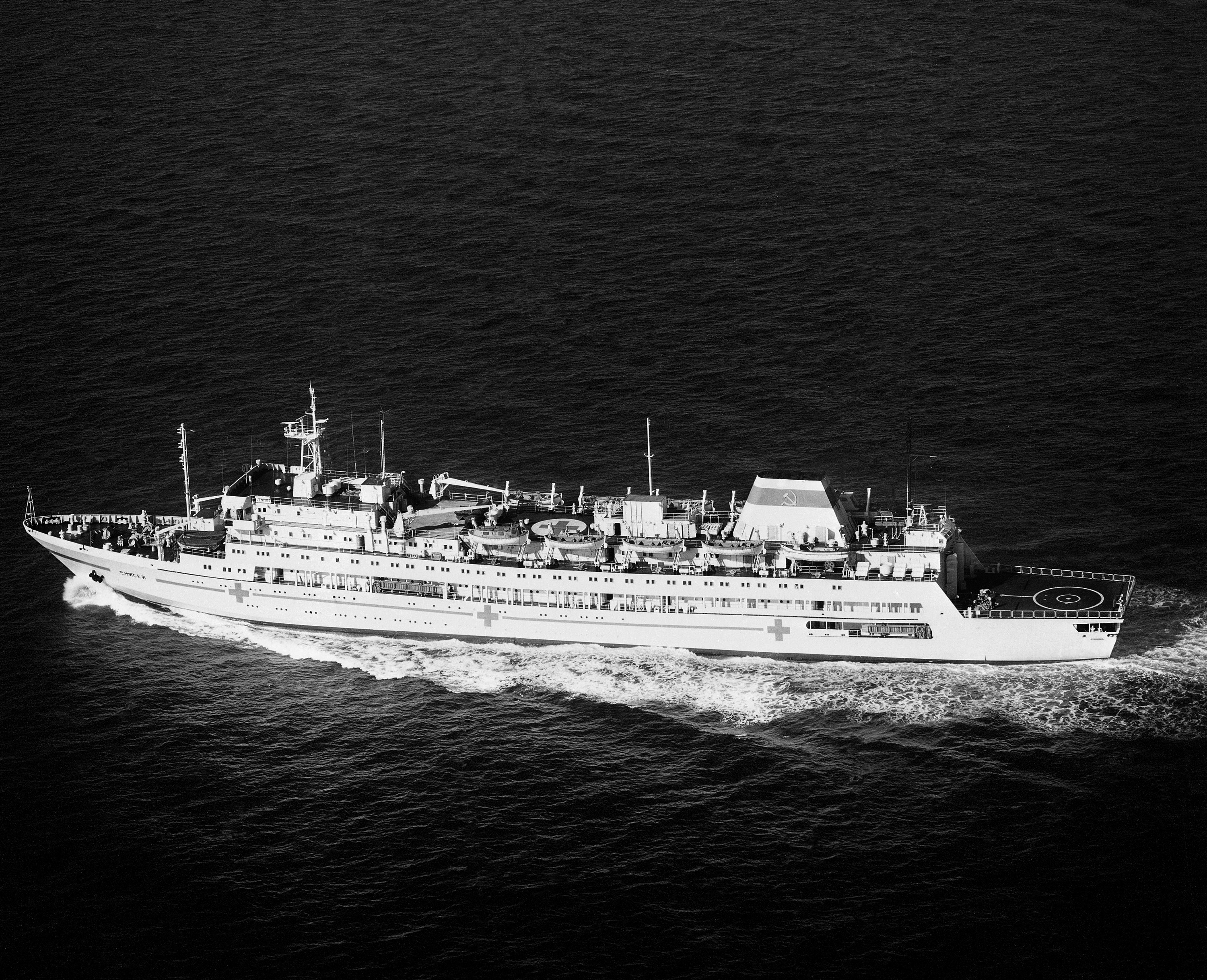
Aerial view of Yenisey underway on 5 May 1989

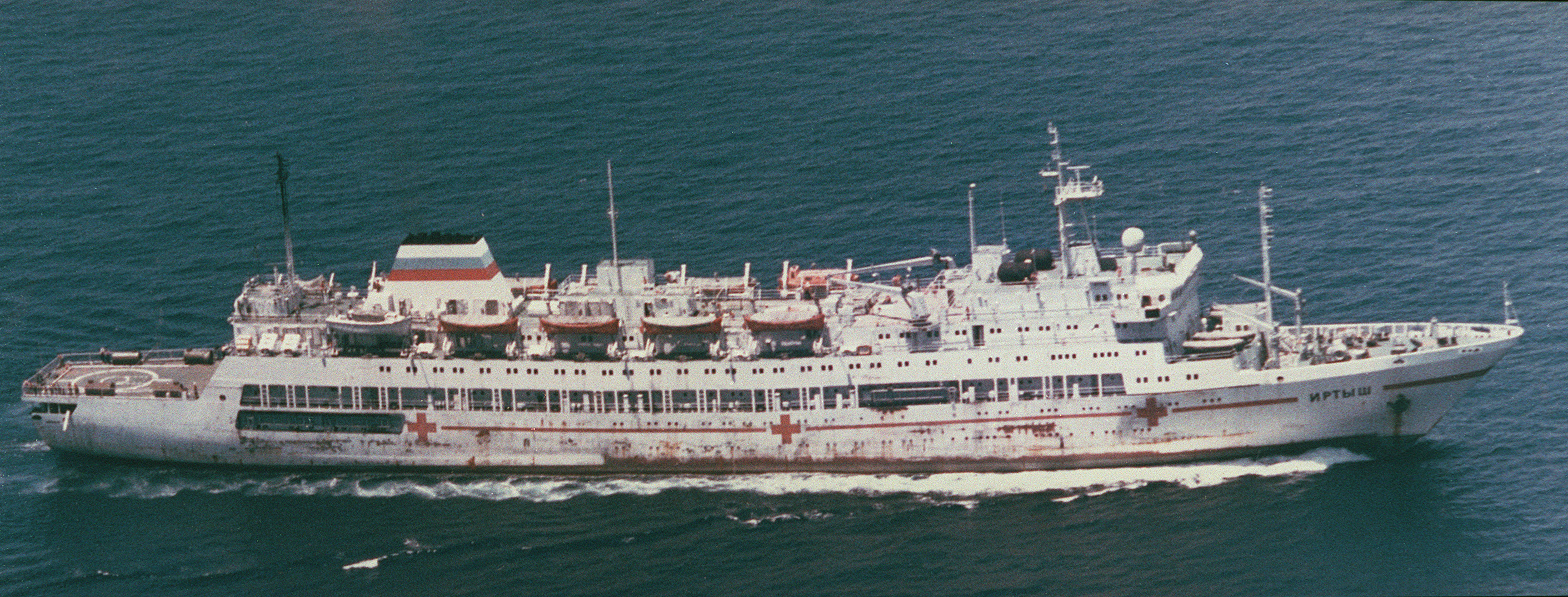
Aerial starboard side view of the Irtysh underway

== See also ==
- List of ships of the Soviet Navy
- List of ships of Russia by project number
