= List of Soviet Union military bases abroad =

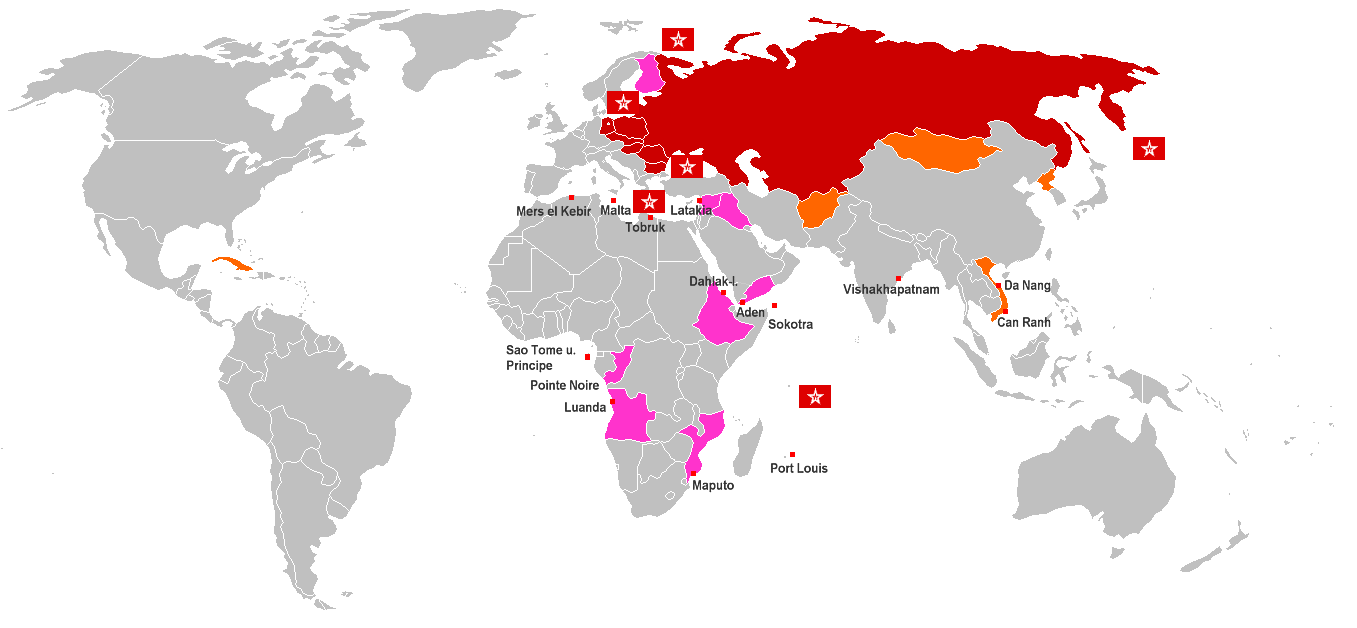
Soviet naval bases and anchor rights abroad in 1984

The Soviet Union maintained a system of foreign military bases against the United States during the Cold War.

== Army bases ==
At different times, various Soviet Army contingents were deployed in different regions of the world:

- In Eastern Europe:
  - Northern Group of Forces (Poland)
  - Central Group of Forces (Austria, Hungary and Czechoslovakia)
  - Group of Soviet Forces in Germany (German Democratic Republic)
  - Southern Group of Forces (Romania and Hungary)
  - Special Corps (Hungary; 1955–1956)
  - Special Mechanized Army (Romania; 1947–1957)
- North-West Group of Forces in the Baltic republics of the USSR (15 November 1991 until the collapse of the USSR)
- Limited Contingent of Soviet Troops in Afghanistan (The 40th Army under the command of the Turkestan Military District; 1979–1989)
- Soviet Forces in Mongolia (under the command of the Transbaikal Military District)
  - 5th Army (1921–1924)
  - 17th Army (1940–1946)
  - 39th Army (1945–1946; 1970–1992)
- 39th Army in China (1945)
- Group of Soviet Military Specialists in China (1948–1961)
- Group of Soviet Military Specialists in Cuba (1962–1991)
- Group of Soviet Military Specialists in Vietnam (1961–1991)

== Naval bases ==
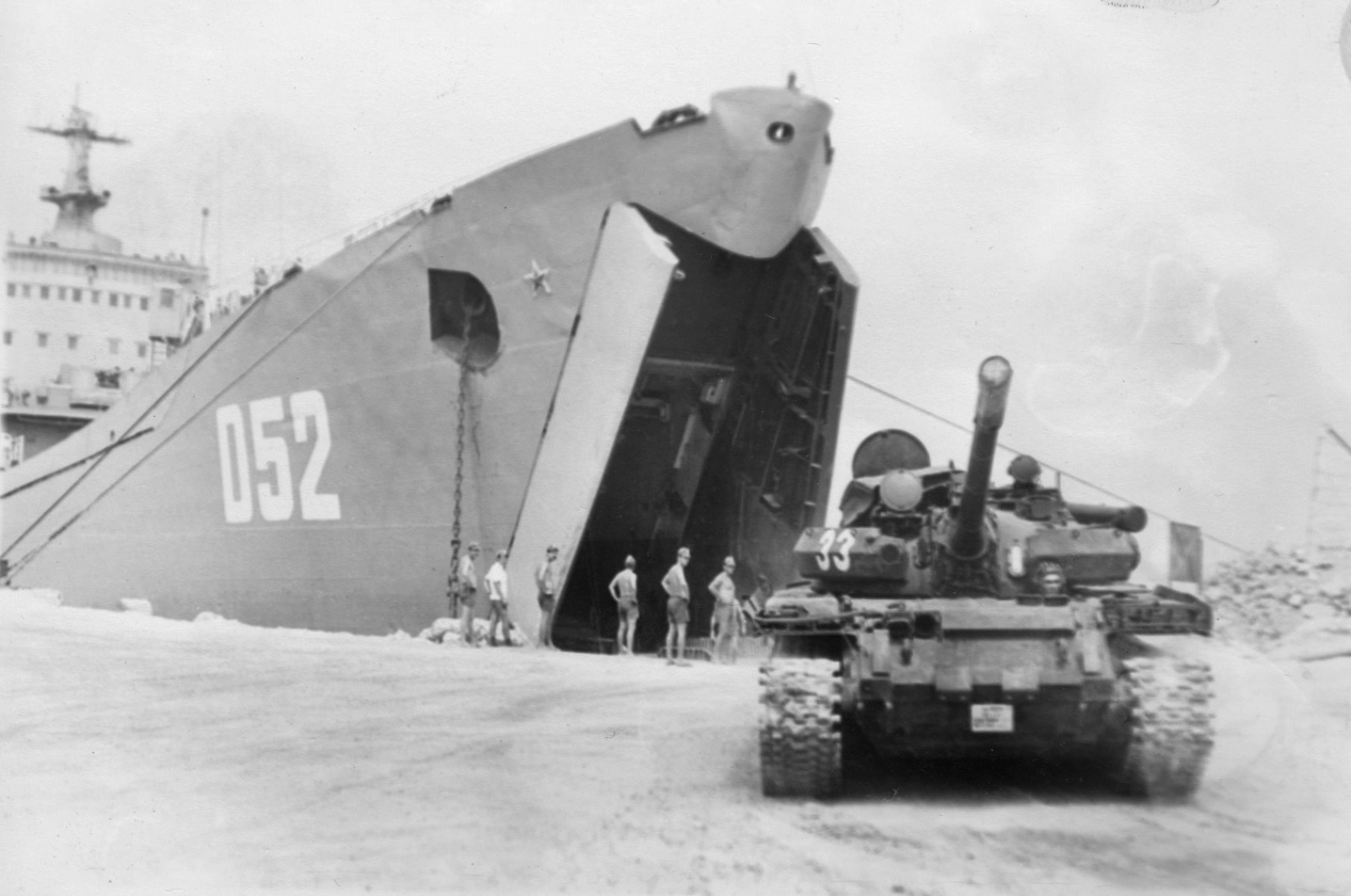
Soviet marines with T-62 at the Nokra Naval Base, 1987.

Location	Country	Dates	Notes
Hanko Naval Base	Finland	1940–1941	Signals intelligence facility.
Alexandria and Marsa Matruh	Egypt	1967–1972	
Latakia and Tartus	Syria	1971–present	
Nokra, Dahlak Archipelago	Ethiopia	1977–1991	
Socotra and Aden	South Yemen	1971–late 1980s	
Tripoli and Tobruk	Libya	1977–2011	
Port Arthur, Bohai Bay	China	1945–1956	It was the largest Soviet base abroad in the 1940s to 1950s.
Cam Ranh Base	Vietnam	1979–2002	
Pasha Liman Base, Vlore	Albania	1955–1962	It was the only Soviet base in the Mediterranean in the 1950s.
Porkkala Naval Base	Finland	1944–1956	Signals intelligence facility.
Rostock	East Germany	1949–1990	Signals intelligence facility.
Swinoujscie	Poland	1949—1991	Signals intelligence facility.

== Air force bases ==
Location	Country	Notes
Cairo, Aswan, Mersa Matruh Airfields	Egypt	
Asmara airfield	Ethiopia	
Hargeisa	Somalia	
Aden, Al-Anad Air Base	South Yemen	
Tuchengzi Air Base and Dalian Zhoushuizi in Dalian, Jiangwan, Dachang, Longhua air bases in Shanghai	China	1945–1956, 1949–1953
Havana	Cuba	
Conakry	Guinea	
Luanda	Angola	
Cam Ranh Base	Vietnam	1979–2002

== See also ==
- List of Russian military bases abroad
- List of American military installations § Foreign bases and facilities
- List of countries with overseas military bases
