= Russian hospital ship Yenisey =

Russian Navy hospital ship

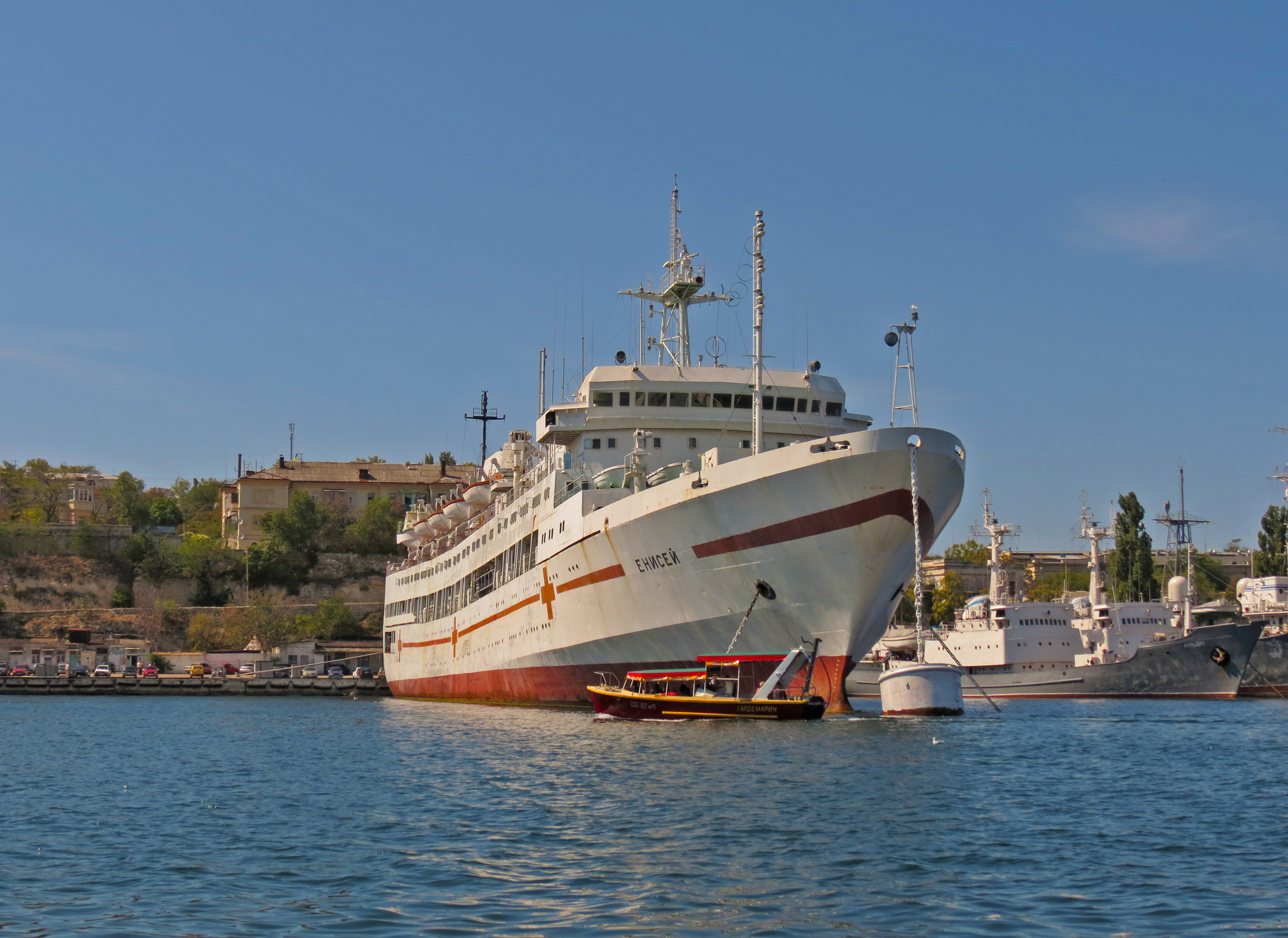
- Yenisey moored in Sevastopol on 14 September 2012

History

→ Russia
- Name: Yenisey; (Енисе́й)
- Namesake: Yenisey
- Owner: Russian Navy
- Builder: Adolf Barsky, Szczecin
- Laid down: 10 September 1979
- Launched: 4 April 1980
- Commissioned: 30 January 1981
- Home port: Sevastopol
- Identification: IMO number: 8956475
- Status: Active

General characteristics
- Class & type: Ob-class hospital ship
- Displacement: Standard: 11,300 tons
- Length: 145.7 m (478 ft)
- Beam: 19.6 m (64 ft)
- Draft: 6.2 m (20 ft)
- Speed: 19.8 knots (36.7 km/h; 22.8 mph)
- Range: 11,600 nmi (21,500 km; 13,300 mi) at 14 kn (26 km/h; 16 mph)
- Boats & landing craft carried: 10 lifeboats
- Troops: 300-450 patients
- Complement: 207 crew
- Aircraft carried: 1 x Kamov Ka-25
- Aviation facilities: Helipad and hangar

Yenisey is a Russian Navy hospital ship of the Ob-class hospital ship. Yenisey is part of the Black Sea Fleet.

== Development ==
The four Ob-class hospital ships were designed to provide medical and recreational facilities. They were also employed as personnel transports. They have civilian crews but carry uniformed naval medical personnel. The ships are fully equipped with surgical equipment. Later two units are Project B-320 II, implying a modification to the basic design; the external differences are minor.

== Construction and career ==
She was laid down on 10 September 1979 and launched on 4 April 1980 by Adolf Barsky shipyard. Commissioned on 30 January 1981 as a hospital ship.

== Gallery ==
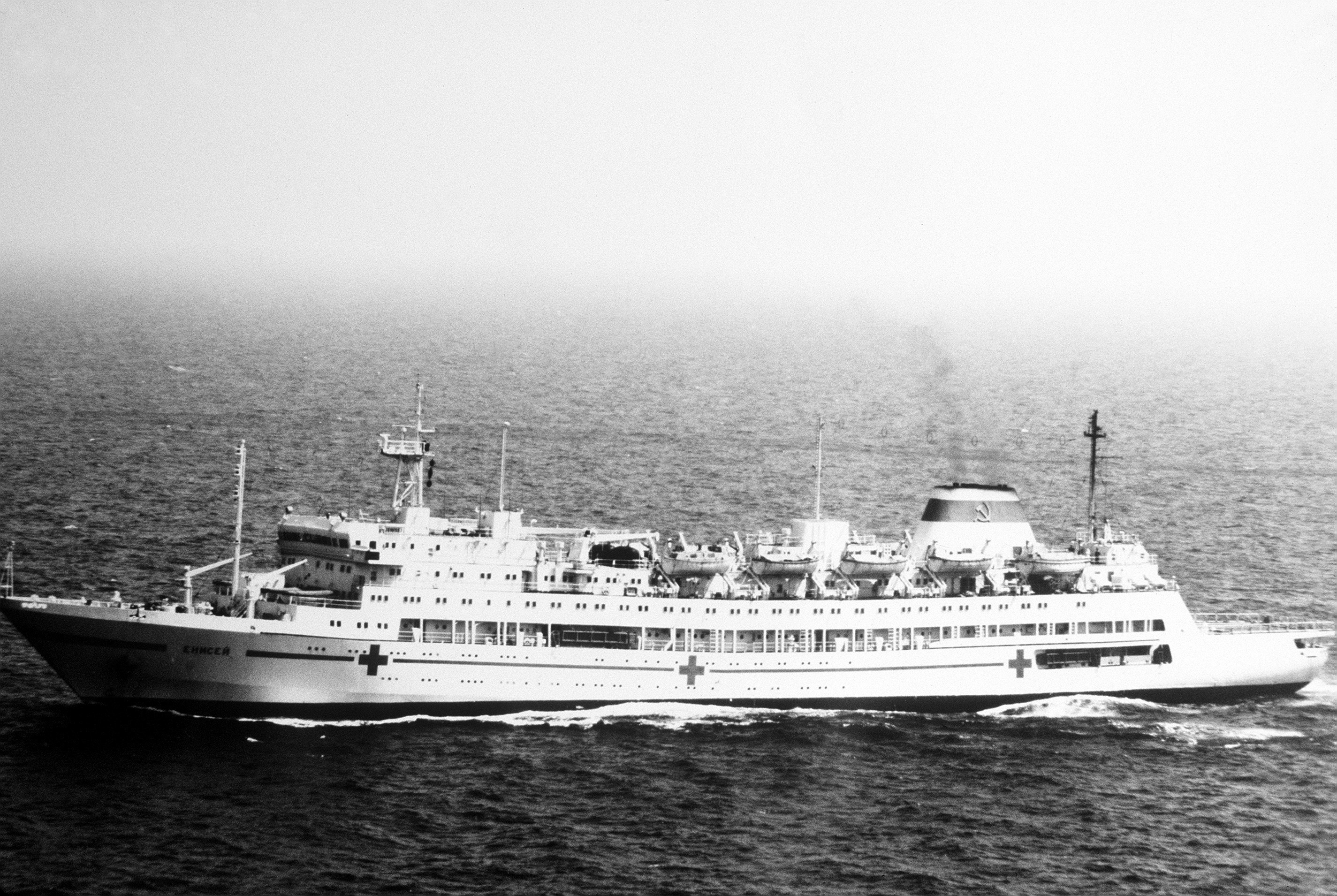
Port view of Yenisey underway on 11 August 1986

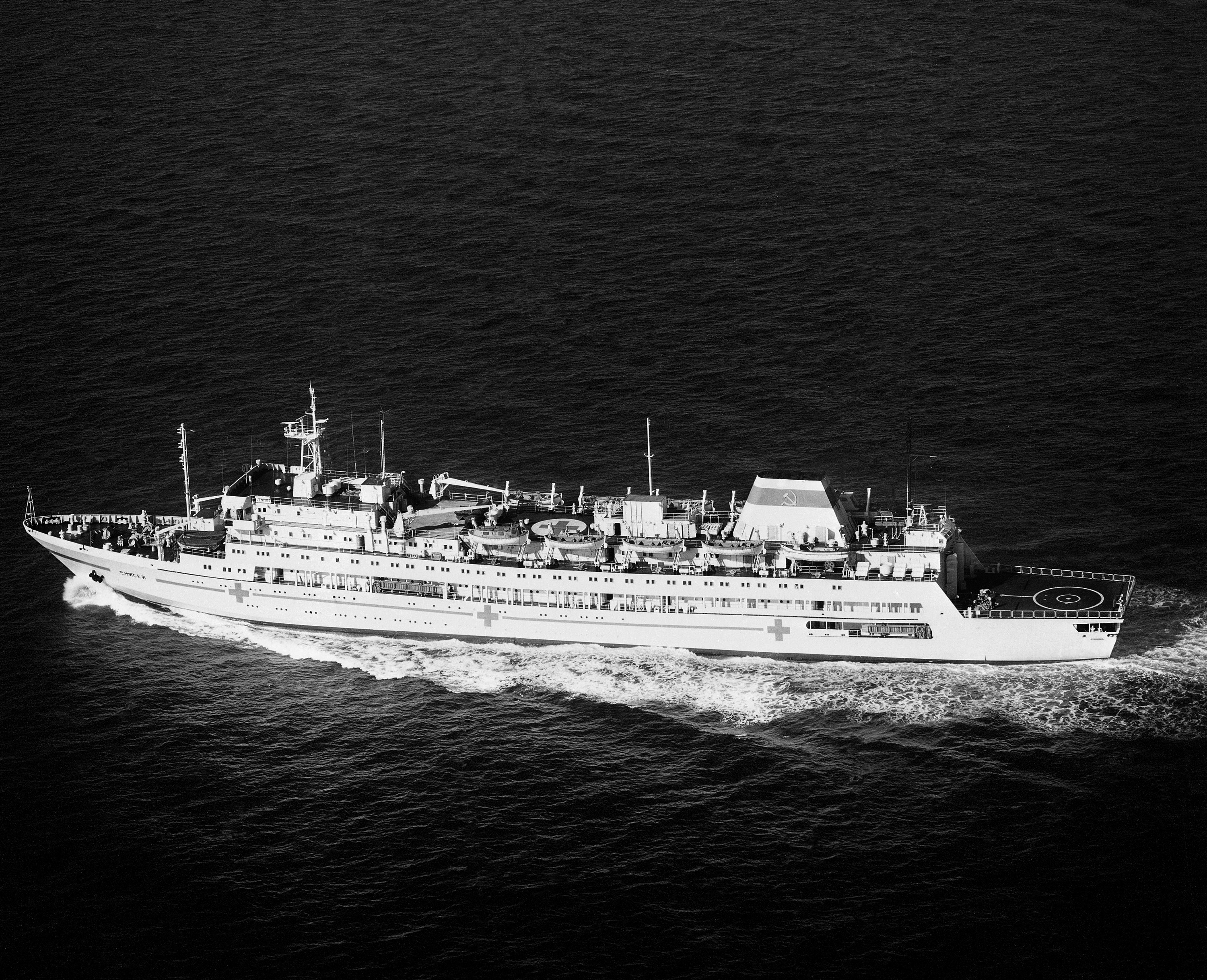
Aerial view of Yenisey underway on 5 May 1989

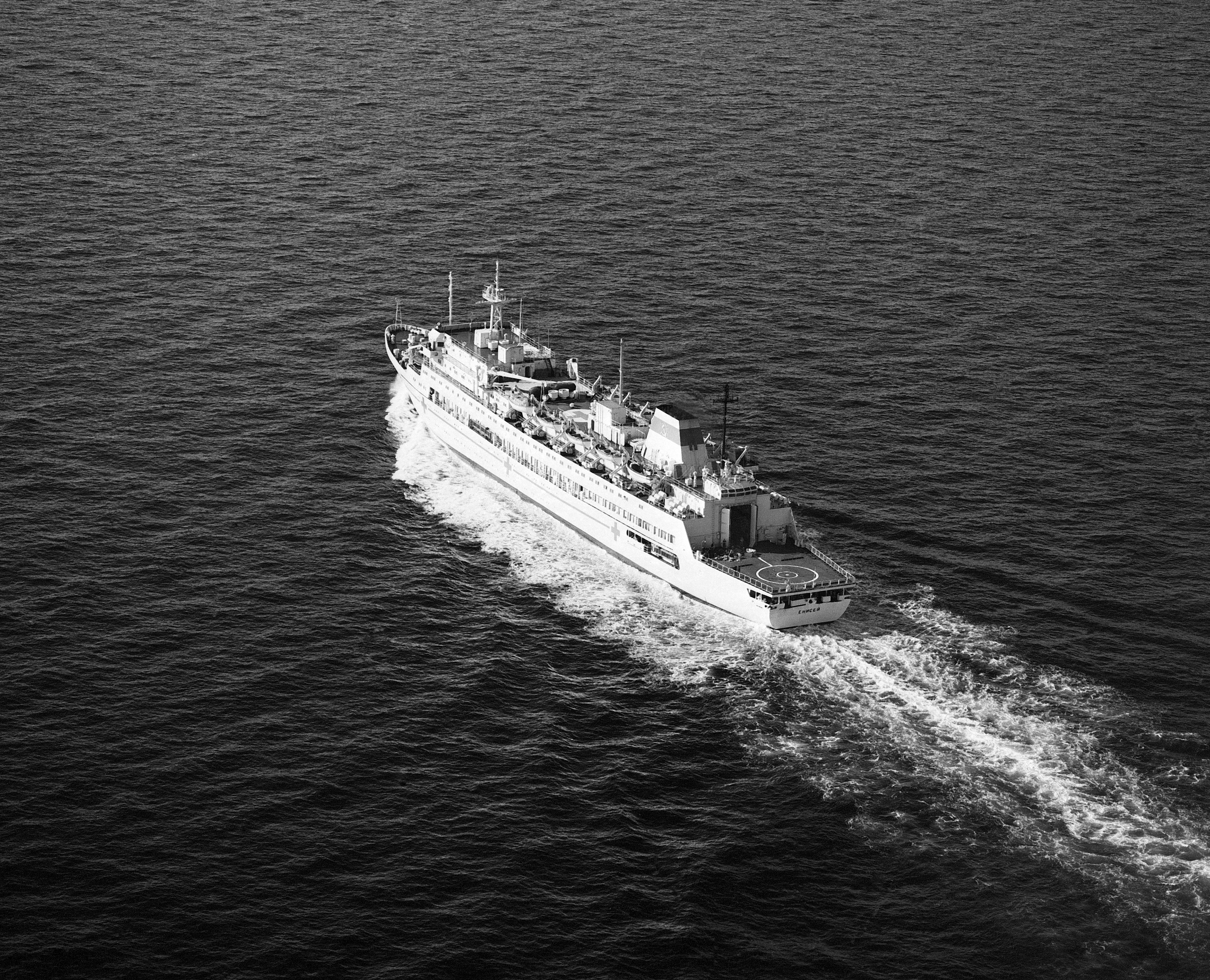
Aerial view of Yenisey underway on 5 May 1989

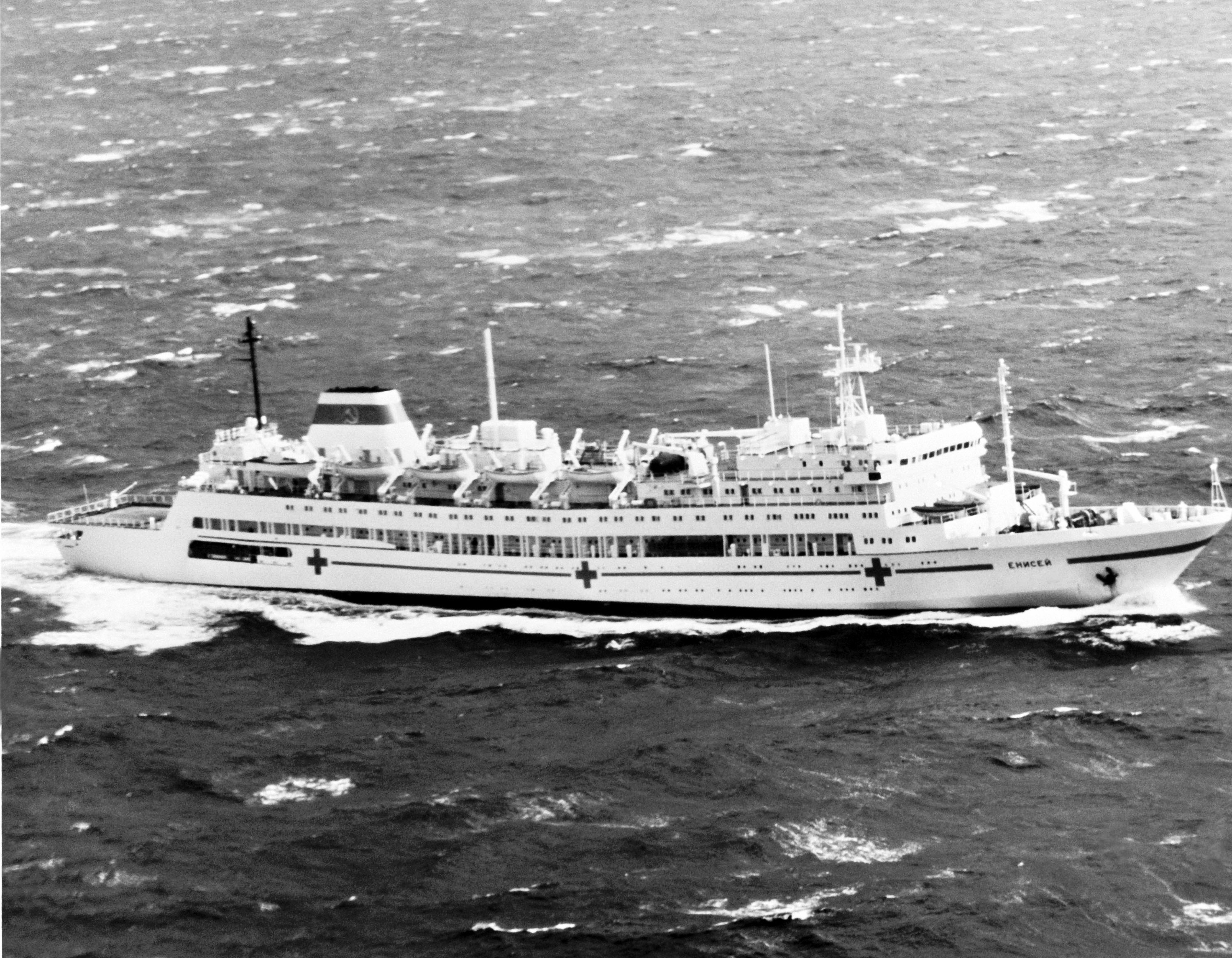
A starboard view of Yenisey underway on 1 October 1989

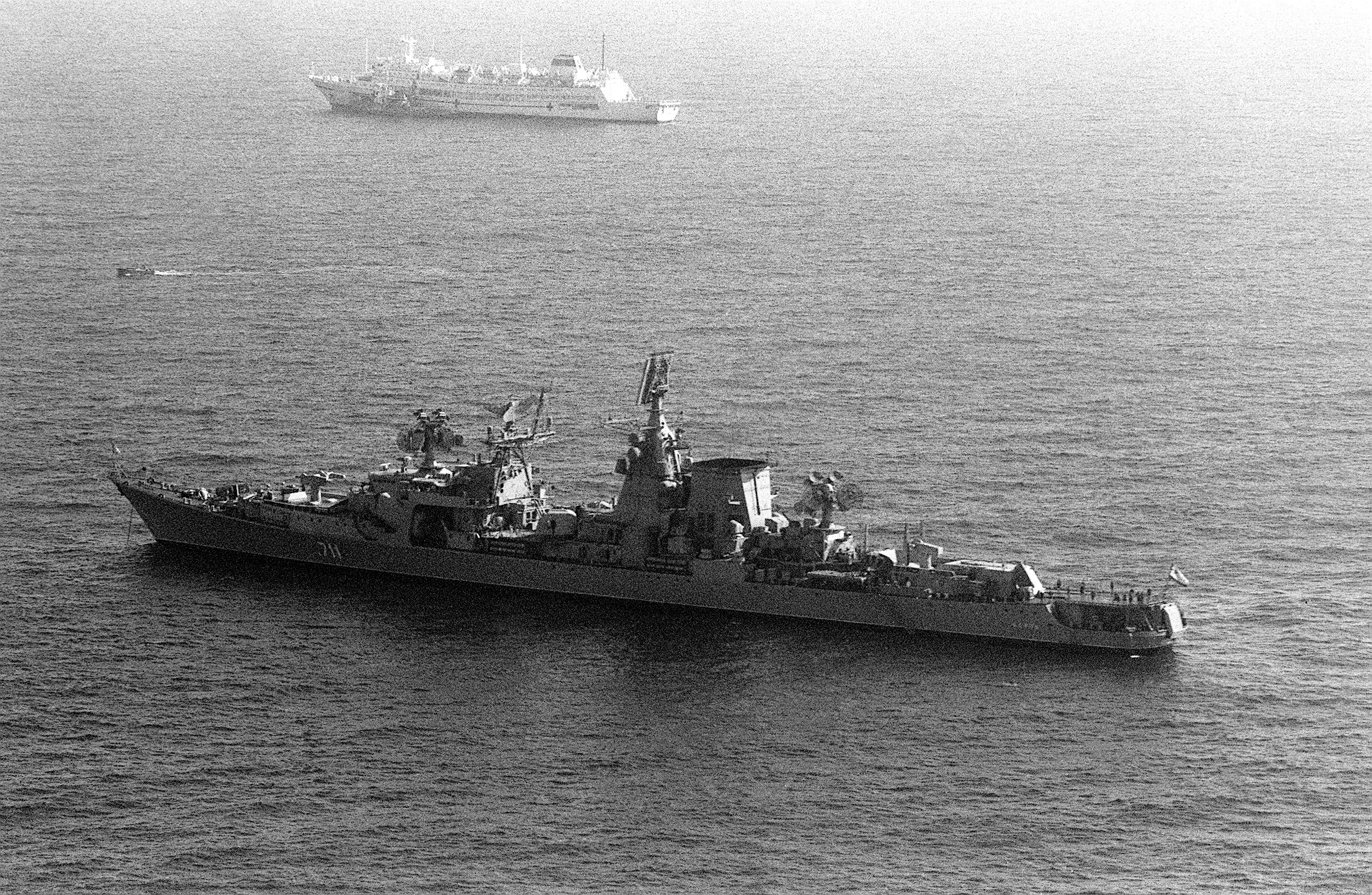
Kerch anchored with Yenisey in the background on 1 June 1991

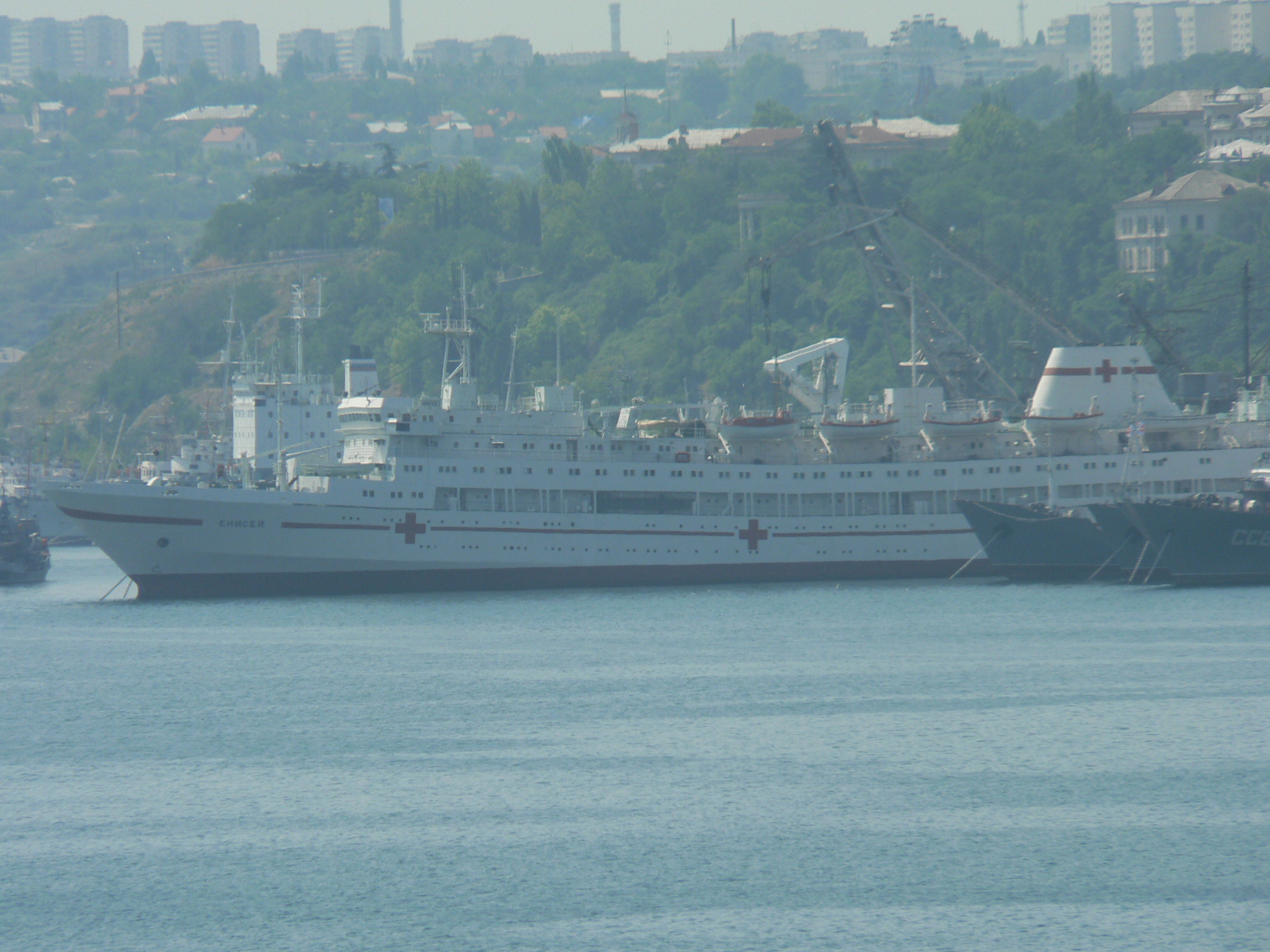
Yenisey moored in Sevastopol on 27 July 2006

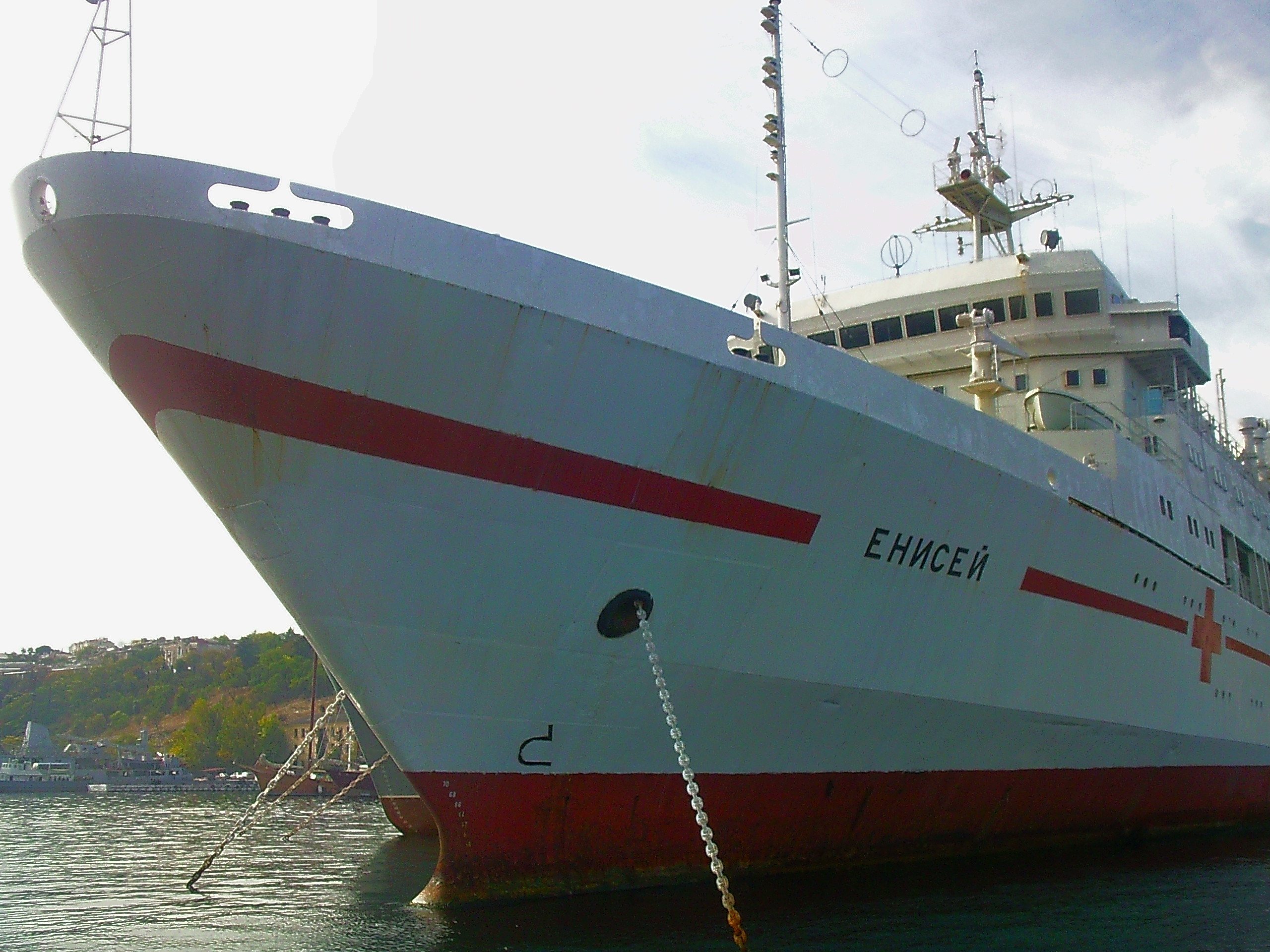
Close-up of Yenisey’s bow on 16 October 2011

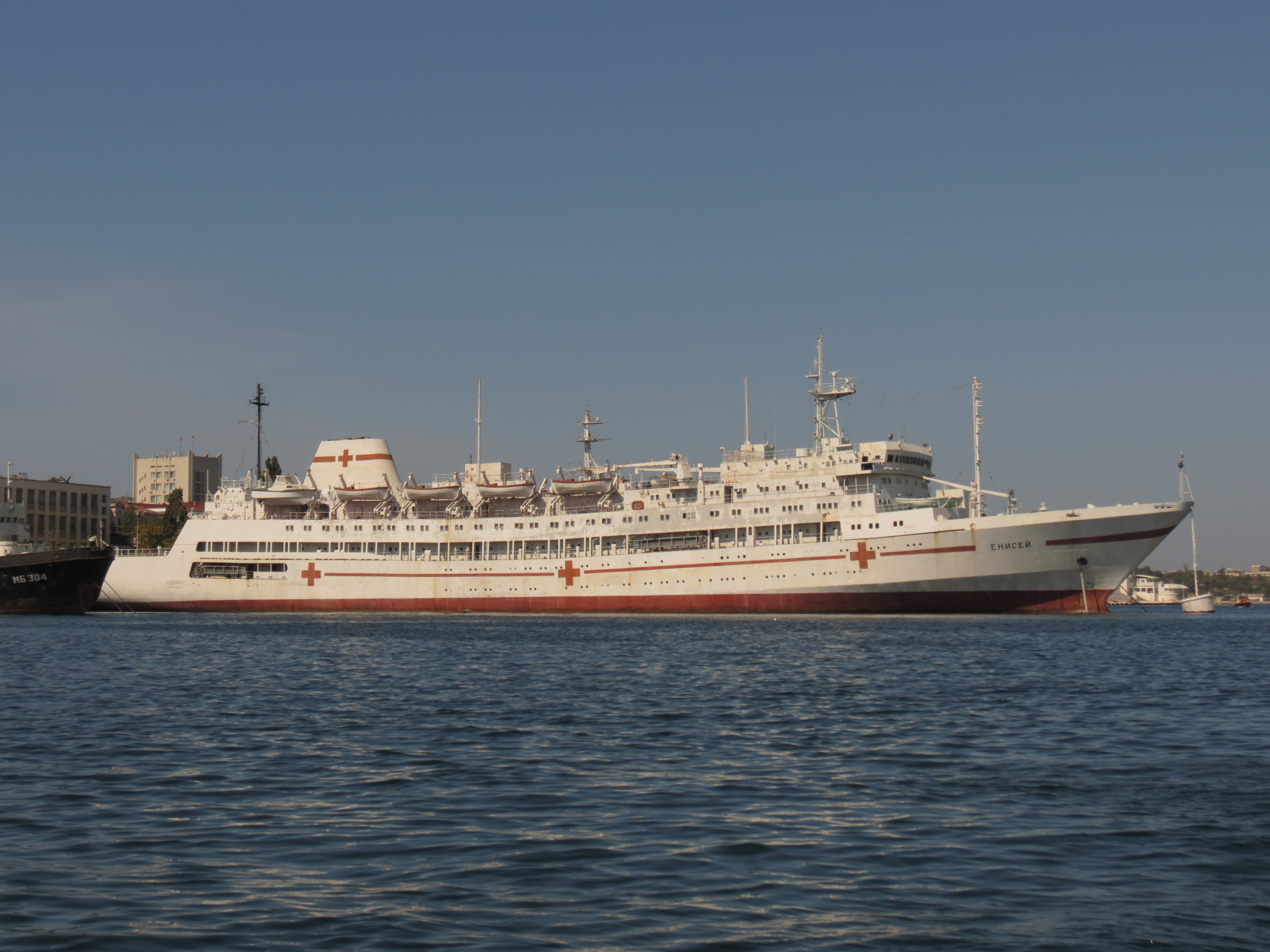
Yenisey moored in Sevastopol on 14 September 2012
