= Russian hospital ship Ob =

Russian Navy hospital ship

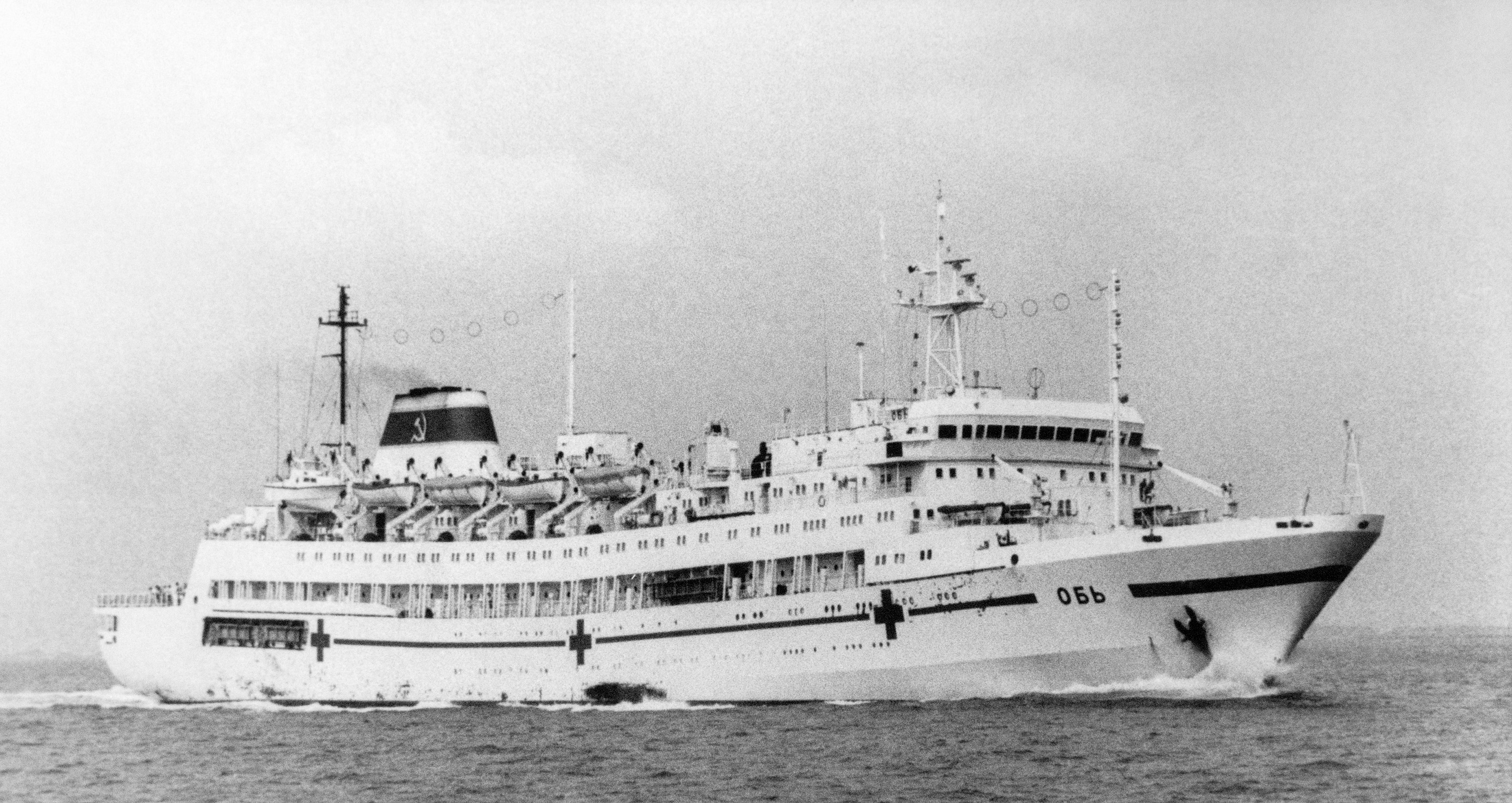
- Ob underway on 1 May 1985

History

→ Russia
- Name: Ob; (Обь)
- Namesake: Ob
- Owner: Russian Navy
- Builder: Adolf Barsky, Szczecin
- Laid down: 17 August 1978
- Launched: 12 April 1979
- Commissioned: 28 March 1980
- Decommissioned: 16 August 1997
- Home port: Vladivostok
- Fate: Scrapped 2007

General characteristics
- Class & type: Ob-class hospital ship
- Displacement: Standard: 11,300 tons
- Length: 145.7 m (478 ft)
- Beam: 19.6 m (64 ft)
- Draft: 6.2 m (20 ft)
- Speed: 19.8 knots (36.7 km/h; 22.8 mph)
- Range: 11,600 nmi (21,500 km; 13,300 mi) at 14 kn (26 km/h; 16 mph)
- Boats & landing craft carried: 10 lifeboats
- Troops: 300-450 patients
- Complement: 207 crew
- Aircraft carried: 1 x Kamov Ka-25
- Aviation facilities: Helipad and hangar

Ob was a hospital ship of the Russian Navy which entered service in 1980 and was scrapped in 2007.

== Development ==
The four Ob-class hospital ships were designed to provide medical and recreational facilities. They were also employed as personnel transports. They have civilian crews but carry uniformed naval medical personnel. The ships are fully equipped with surgical equipment. Later two units are Project B-320 II, implying a modification to the basic design; the external differences are minor.

== Construction and career ==
She was laid down on 17 August 1978 and launched on 12 April 1979 by Adolf Barsky shipyard. Commissioned on 28 March 1980 as a hospital ship and decommissioned on 16 August 1997. She was scrapped at Alang on 13 March 2007.

== Gallery ==
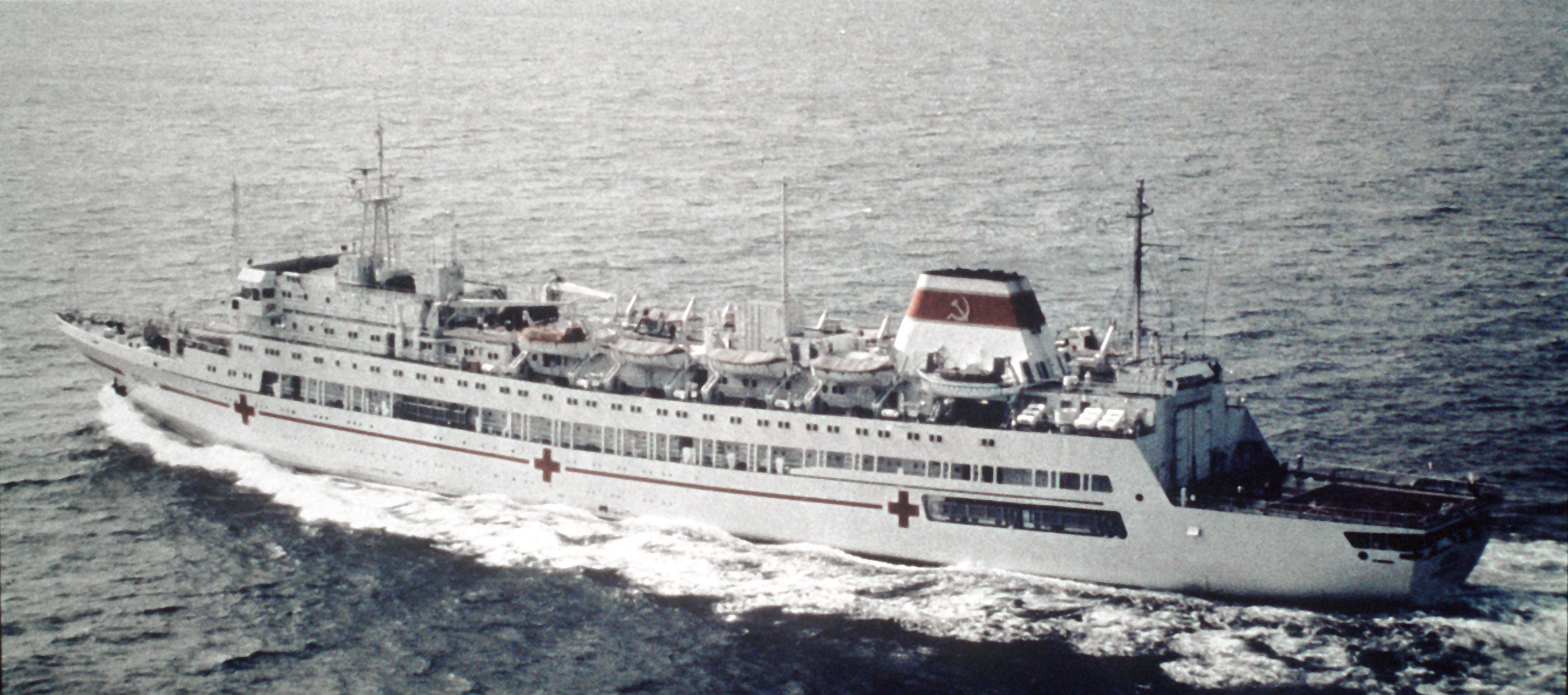
Aerial view of Ob underway on 1 April 1982

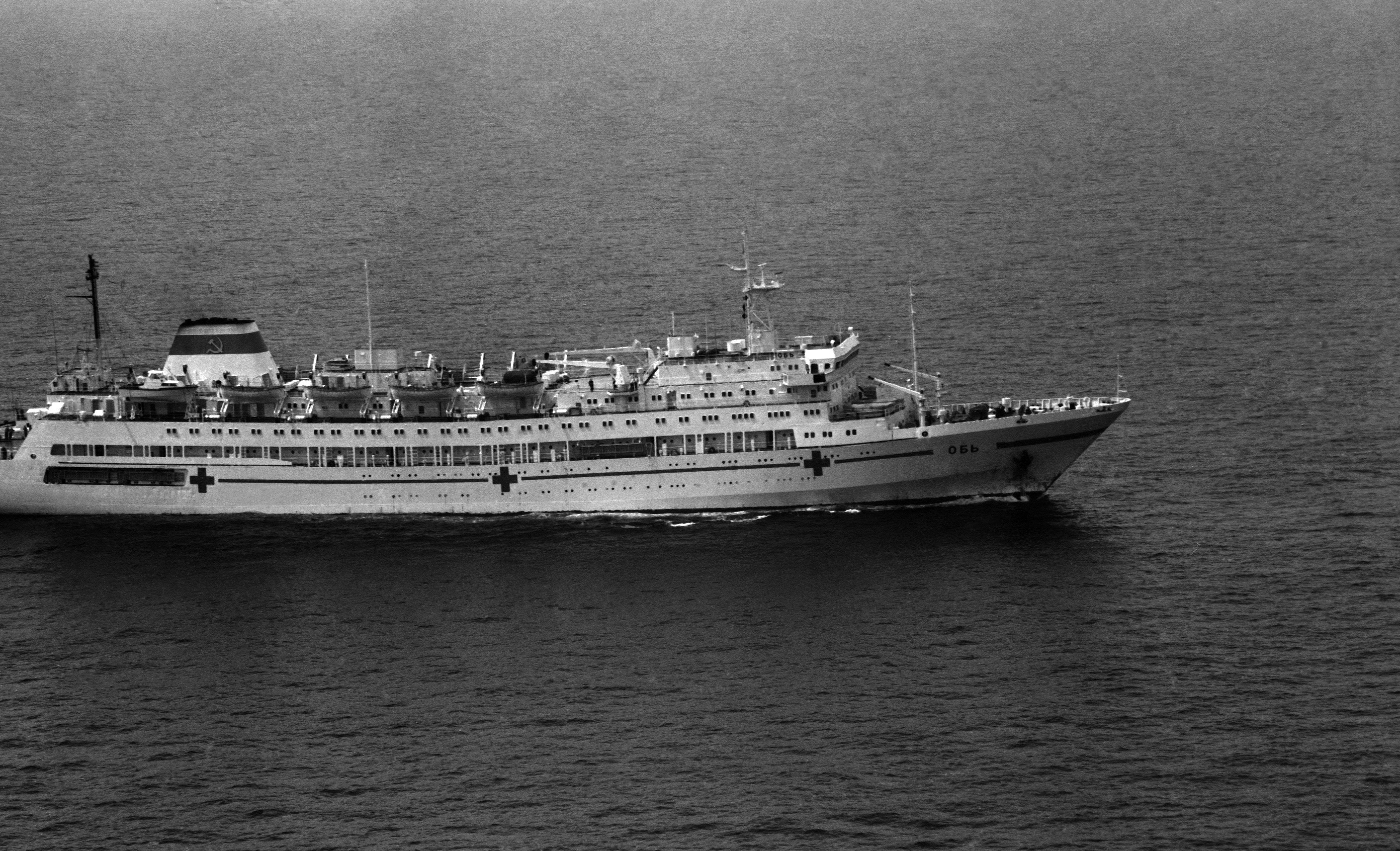
Starboard view of Ob underway on 1 January 1987
