= List of armored cruisers of China =

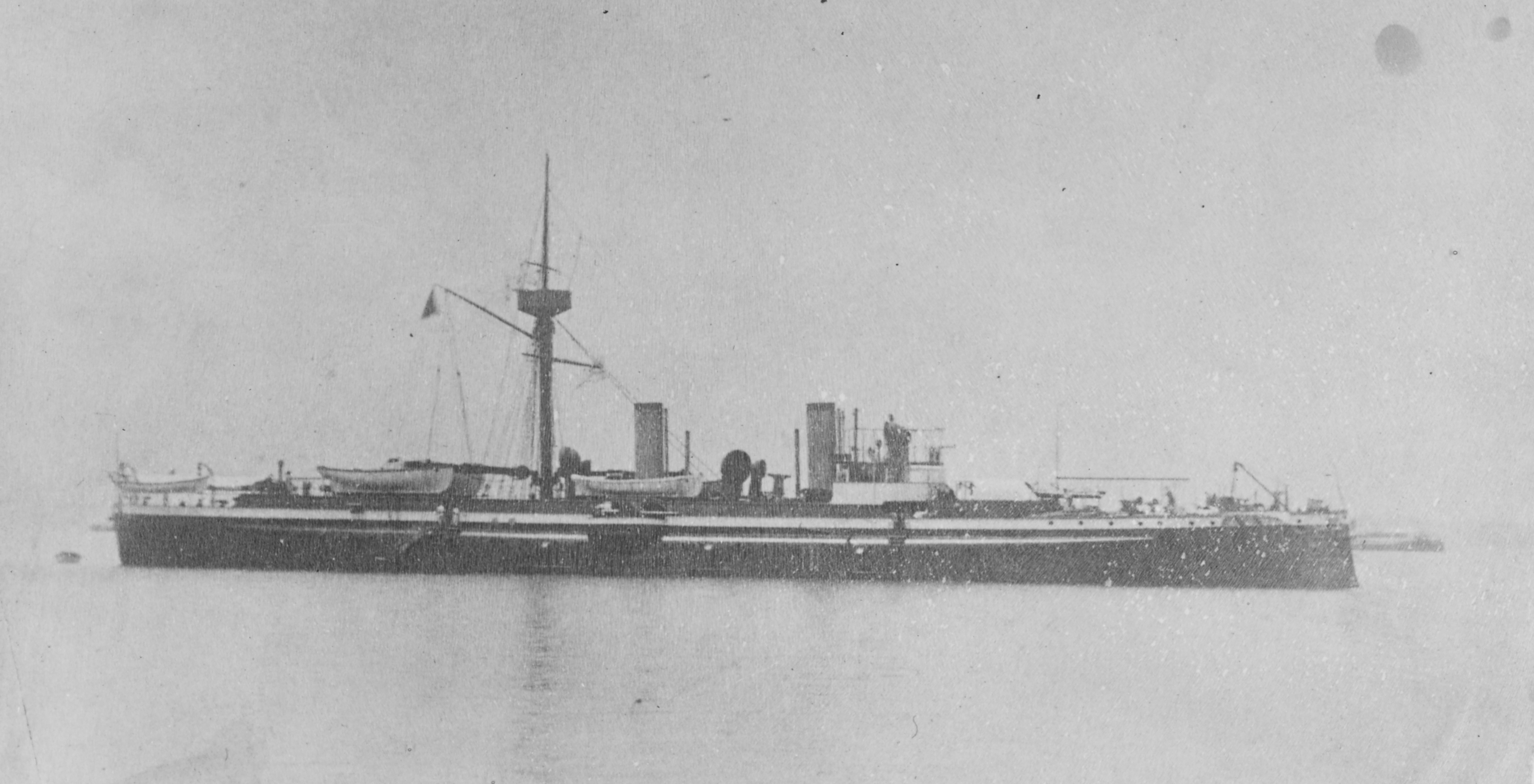
The King Yuen underway

The List of armored cruisers of China encompasses all armored cruisers that were either commissioned or planned for procurement by China since the late Qing dynasty began establishing a modern navy in the 19th century. This includes vessels that served in the modernized fleet, as well as those that were planned for procurement by the Republic of China Navy.

This batch of cruisers originated from the late Qing government's foreign procurement during the establishment of the Beiyang Fleet. The vessels included the Tsi Yuen, ordered from Germany, along with two King Yuen-class armored cruisers: King Yuen and Lai Yuen; as well as two Chih Yuen-class cruisers ordered from Britain: Chih Yuen and Ching Yuen. As the first armored cruisers built indigenously by Germany, Tsi Yuen and the two King Yuen-class ships were commissioned into the Beiyang Fleet upon their completion and return to China. All of these armored cruisers were either captured or sunk during the First Sino-Japanese War.

Following the Sino-French War, with the support of the Qing government, the Foochow Arsenal built the cruiser Pingyuan, modeled after the French coastal defense ironclad Achéron-class. This marked the first armored cruiser built indigenously in China. The vessel was ultimately captured by the Japanese after the First Sino-Japanese War and continued to serve under her original name until she was sunk during the Russo-Japanese War. In the early years of the Republic of China, the Provisional Government of the Republic of China attempted to order an armored cruiser from the Austro-Hungarian Cantiere Navale Triestino through the German trading firm Arnold, Karberg & Co. However, the deal was ultimately aborted due to the outbreak of World War I.

Definitions
Builder	Name of the ship's builder
Armament	The number and type of the primary armament
Armor	The thickness of the belt or deck armor
Displacement	Ship displacement at full combat load (Note: Historian Erich Gröner states that full load was defined as "[equal to] type displacement plus full load fuel oil, diesel oil, coal, reserve boiler feed water, aircraft fuel, and special equipment.")
Propulsion	Number of shafts, type of propulsion system, and top speed generated
Cost	Cost of the ship's construction
Service	The dates work began and finished on the ship and its ultimate fate
Laid down	The date the keel began to be assembled
Launched	The date the ship was launched
Commissioned	The date the ship was commissioned
Fate	The eventual fate of the ship (e.g., sunk, scrapped)

== History ==
The armored cruiser started in 1870 with the General-Admiral, a large cruiser built for the Imperial Russian Navy. Unprecedentedly, this vessel was equipped with a belt armor, a feature previously exclusive to ironclads. This innovation allowed nations with limited military strength and financial resources to procure warships with protection levels approaching those of ironclads, at the cost of a cruiser.

As a vessel capable of significantly enhancing military strength, it became the Qing government's top priority in its efforts to rebuild coastal naval defenses after the Sino-French War. In 1880, Li Hongzhang ordered the first armored cruiser Tsi Yuen, from the United Kingdom. In 1885, the King Yuen-class and Chih Yuen-class cruisers were ordered from Britain and Germany, respectively. The two ships of the King Yuen-class withstood concentrated Japanese attacks for over an hour during the Battle of the Yellow Sea before sinking, demonstrating their formidable survivability in combat. After the Sino-French War, the Foochow Arsenal independently constructed a steel-hulled cruiser by referencing the designs of the Chao Yong, Tsi Yuen, and the French Achéron-class coastal defense ironclads. As the first armored cruiser built by the Foochow Arsenal, this vessel represented the pinnacle of China's shipbuilding industry in the 1880s. Upon completion, she was named Longwei, but was ultimately renamed Ping Yuen after being transferred to the Beiyang Fleet. She was captured and commissioned into the Japanese fleet following the First Sino-Japanese War. After the Beiyang government of the Republic of China came to power, it initiated a series of efforts to reclaim warships under construction overseas. However, due to poor financial conditions, some vessels could not be recovered. Regarding new construction plans, after the contract with the Arnold, Karberg & Co. for destroyers fell through, the Beiyang government instead ordered one armored cruiser from the Stabilimento Tecnico Triestino of Austria-Hungary.

"According to various historical records and publications, the classification of the same vessel often varies. Furthermore, the categorization of a single ship based on its intended role could change across different periods. For instance, while some sources classify the Tsi Yuen as an armored cruiser, others categorize her as a protected cruiser due to her specific armor scheme. Similarly, the King Yuen-class has been classified as an armored cruiser by some, while other sources designate her as a protected cruiser. The Chih Yuen-class has also been subject to this discrepancy, with some sources identifying her as an armored cruiser and others as a protected cruiser. As for the Pingyuan, she has been categorized as an armored cruiser, a steel-hulled cruiser, or a steel-armored cruiser. Meanwhile, other sources classify her as a coastal defense cruiser or a coastal defense ironclad.

== Tsi Yuen ==
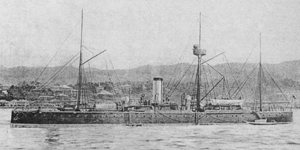
The Tsi Yuen, equipped with two masts for hoisting sails, was intended for its return to China.

Due to his distrust of Inspector General of Customs Robert Hart, Li Hongzhang instructed Minister to Germany Li Fengbao to order another cruiser in Germany. After evaluating the options, Li ordered a new cruiser from the A.G. Vulcan, which was already constructing the Ting Yuen and Chen Yuen. Given the yard number 131, the ship was later named Tsi Yuen by Li Hongzhang. As Germany's first domestically designed protected cruiser, she was designed by Rudolph Haack, the engineer of the Ting Yuen-class.

The ship's armament consisted of two 210mm Krupp guns at the bow, one 150mm Krupp gun at the stern, two 47mm multi-barrel quick-firing guns, and nine 37mm single-barrel quick-firing guns. In addition, she was equipped with four 15-inch torpedo tubes and two shipborne torpedo boats.

Upon completion, the Tsi Yuen was forced to remain in Germany due to the Sino-French War, and did not return to China in formation with the Ting Yuen and Chen Yuen until after the war ended. Following her acceptance by the Chinese government in November 1885, she was commissioned into the Beiyang Fleet. In June 1891, she visited Japan alongside the Ting Yuen and Chen Yuen. In 1894, she escorted troops to Asan Bay, Korea, alongside the Kuang Yi. On her return voyage, she was ambushed near Pungdo by the First Flying Squadron of the Japanese Combined Fleet, specifically the cruisers Yoshino and Naniwa. During this engagement, the Tsi Yuen sustained damage. Later that September, she was heavily damaged and withdrew from the Battle of the Yellow Sea. Ultimately, during the Battle of Weihaiwei in February 1895, the Beiyang Fleet was defeated and surrendered to Japan, resulting in her capture and subsequent commissioning into the Japanese fleet.

Ship	Builder	Armament	Armor	Displacement	Propulsion	Cost	Service			
Ship	Builder	Armament	Armor	Displacement	Propulsion	Cost	Laid down	Launched	Commissioned	Fate
Tsi Yuen (濟遠)	Germany A.G. Vulcan	2 × 210 millimetres (8 in)	14 inches (356 mm) (main battery)	2,355 tonnes (2,318 long tons)	2 shafts, 4 coal-fired boilers (Note: Other sources record the number of boilers as six.), 2 steam engines, 15 knots (28 km/h; 17 mph) (Note: Other sources record it as 16.5 knots or 18 knots (33 km/h; 21 mph).), 1,925 indicated horsepower (1,435 kW) (Note: Other sources record it as 2,800 horsepower.)	686,000 taels of silve	February 17, 1883 (ordered)	December 1, 1883	September 1884 (Note: Other sources record the date as November 8, 1885.)	struck a mine and sank off the coast of Port Arthur, November 30, 1904

== King Yuen-class ==
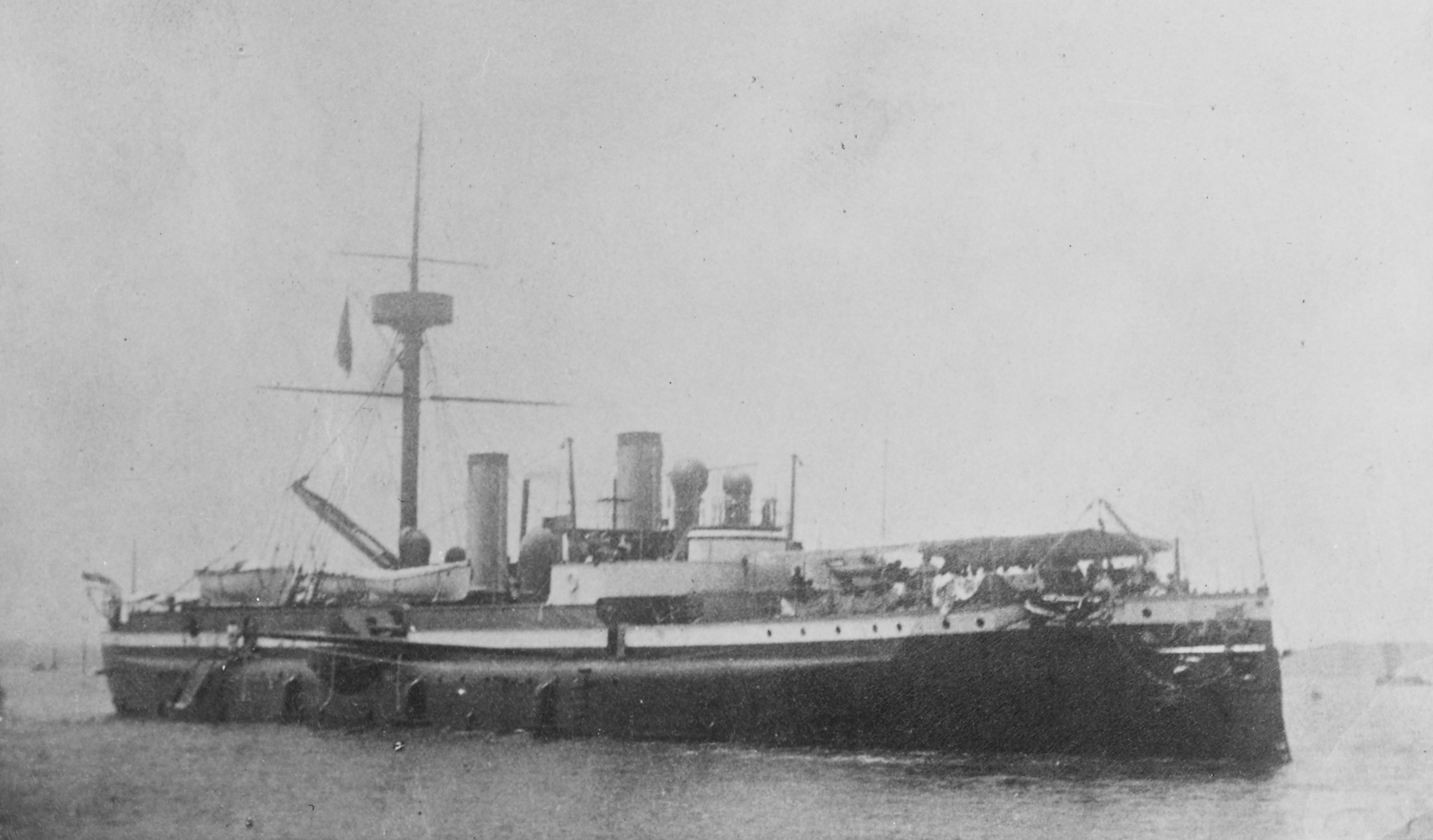
Lai Yuen.

To rebuild the coastal naval defenses of Fujian and Taiwan, which had been virtually annihilated following the Sino-French War, Li Hongzhang envisioned having two new cruisers built based on the Tsi yuan-class design, with one constructed by a British shipyard and the other by a German shipyard. Subsequently, following a recommendation by Zeng Jize, the then Minister to the United Kingdom, to re-evaluate the design, and after extensive communication and research by Xu Jingcheng, the Minister to Germany, the project was altered in 1887. The new vessels were then designed and built as modern armored cruisers by the German Vulcan shipyard.

As the first armored cruiser designed and built entirely in German history, the Jingyuan class was designed under the supervision of Rudolph Haack, a designer at the Vulcan shipyard. Rudolph Haack was also the designer of the Ting Yuen-class ironclads for the Chinese Navy. In terms of design, the King Yuen-class was similar to the ironclads, but with a slightly larger hull than the Tsi Yuen-class. Her propulsion system consisted of two horizontal triple-expansion steam engines, with four boilers housed in two boiler rooms, and a designed coal capacity of 320 to 350 tons. Externally, ships of this class featured a single mast and twin funnels, with the mast located aft of the funnels, which served as their most distinctive identifying feature.

The central sections of the hull, including the ammunition magazines, steam engines, and machinery, were protected by an armored enclosure. Because the area above the waterline was highly vulnerable to attack, while the underwater section was naturally shielded by the water itself, the King Yuen-class ships adopted a sloped belt armor that was thicker at the top and thinner at the bottom. However, since the armor belt was assembled from multiple plates, a direct hit on the seams could easily cause structural failure and flooding. The main gun barbettes were equipped with open-backed gun shields, which were 1.5 inches (38 mm) thick, while the breastwork armor of the barbettes was 8 inches (203 mm) thick. The conning tower featured 6 inches (152 mm) thick side walls. Its roof was elevated significantly above the tower walls, supported by only a few pillars. Although this design improved the field of view, it also left a dangerous vulnerability, allowing shrapnel and small-caliber shells to penetrate through the gaps.

Ship	Builder	Armament	Armor	Displacement	Propulsion	Cost	Service			
Ship	Builder	Armament	Armor	Displacement	Propulsion	Cost	Laid down	Launched	Commissioned	Fate
King Yuen (經遠)	Germany A.G. Vulcan	2 × 210 millimetres (8 in)	9.5 inches (241 mm) (belt)	2,900 tonnes (2,854 long tons)	2 shafts, 4 cylindrical coal-fired boilers, 2 reciprocating steam engines, 15.5 knots (28.7 km/h; 17.8 mph), (Note: Other sources record the speed as 15 knots (28 km/h; 17 mph).) 4,400 indicated horsepower (3,300 kW) (Note: Other sources record as 5,000 indicated horsepower (3,700 kW).)	870,000 taels of silver	January 1, 1885	January 3, 1887	January 1887	Be hit by Japan and sunk on September 17, 1894
Lai Yuen (來遠)	Germany A.G. Vulcan	2 × 210 millimetres (8 in)	9.5 inches (241 mm) (belt)	2,900 tonnes (2,854 long tons)	2 shafts, 4 cylindrical coal-fired boilers, 2 reciprocating steam engines, 16 knots (30 km/h; 18 mph), (Note: Other sources record it as 15 knots (28 km/h; 17 mph).) 4,400 indicated horsepower (3,300 kW) (Note: Other sources record it as 5,000 indicated horsepower (3,700 kW).)	870,000 taels of silver	January 1, 1885	March 25, 1887	March 1887	Be hit by Japan and sunk on February 6, 1895

== Ping Yuen ==
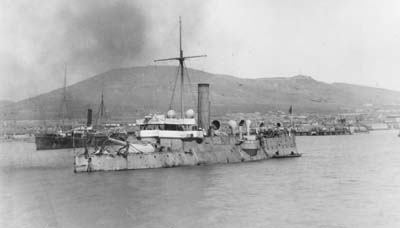
The Ping Yuen, captured by the Japanese army and moored at Liugong Island pier。

After the Battle of Mawei, in order to rebuild the almost completely destroyed Fujian Fleet, the newly appointed Minister of Naval Affairs, Pei Yinsen (裴荫森), applied to the Qing government to build ironclad warships independently. Originally, three ships were planned to be built, but with the support of Empress Dowager Cixi, only one ship was finally approved to be built. In 1886, the hull of the ship was designed and supervised by Wei Han (魏瀚), Zheng Qinglian (郑清濂) and others from the Fuzhou Naval Dockyard, while the engine was supervised by Chen Zhao'ao (陈兆翱) and others within the shipyard. The design drawings of the ship referenced the French Acheron-class coastal defense ironclad gunboats.

The ship was armed with a 260 mm gun that could be steered with a rotating platform as its main gun. It was also equipped with a 150 mm steel-hooped gun in the turrets on both sides. In addition, the ship was not equipped with a large-caliber stern gun. Compared with the prototype, the ship was of similar main dimensions but had a larger displacement. In terms of armor design, the ship adopted a double-layer steel bottom design and was equipped with a waterline armor belt around the entire ship. Most of the construction materials were purchased from France. Although the defensive capabilities were strong, the ship was still based on the mosquito boat, resulting in poor overall maneuverability and slow speed. The ship was numbered No. 29 when it was built at the shipyard and was named "Lung Wei" after completion.

After its completion, the ship was assigned to the Beiyang Navy, but ownership belonged to the Nanyang Fleet. At the suggestion of Li Hongzhang, it was renamed Yu Yuen. Because it had the same name as a cruiser of the Nanyang Fleet, it was later renamed Ping Yuen. In 1894, with the outbreak of the First Sino-Japanese War, Ping Yuen participated in the mission of escorting troop transport ships on the Yalu River. On September 17, the ship and Guangbing arrived at the battlefield and launched an attack with the Japanese flagship Matsushima. It was forced to withdraw from the battle after being hit by a shell. The following year, after the Battle of Liugong Island, Ping Yuen was captured and incorporated into the Japanese Navy, becoming a first-class gunboat of the Japanese Navy. In 1904, it sank after hitting a mine in the Russo-Japanese War, 1.5 nautical miles west of Tiedao Island in the Bohai Sea.

Ship	Builder	Armament	Armor	Displacement	Propulsion	Cost	Service			
Ship	Builder	Armament	Armor	Displacement	Propulsion	Cost	Laid down	Launched	Commissioned	Fate
Ping Yuen (平遠) formerly Lung Wei (龍威)	Qing dynasty Foochow Arsenal	1 × 260 millimetres (10 in)	203 millimetres (8 in) (magazine and bioler)	2,640 tonnes (2,598 long tons)	2 shafts, 4 cylindrical boilers, 2 compound steam engines, 10.5 knots (19.4 km/h; 12.1 mph), 2,400 indicated horsepower (1,790 kW)	524,000 taels of silver	December 7, 1886	January 29, 1888	September 28, 1889	Surrendered to the Japanese on February 17, 1895, sunk on September 18, 1904

== No. 68 ==
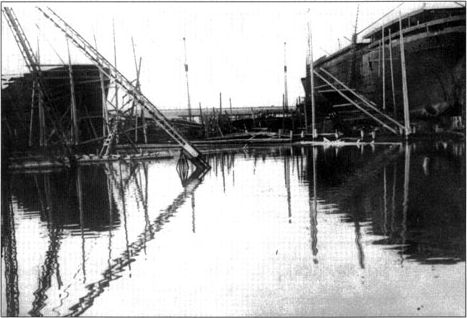
No. 68 in the dry dock of Montfalcone, 1915.

On April 10, 1913, the Provisional Government of the Republic of China signed a loan contract with the Arnhold & Karberg & Co. for £3.2 million to order a total of 18 destroyers from Germany and Austria-Hungary. However, on April 26, the British-led consortium of six banks signed the Chinese Government Reorganisation Loan Agreement with the Provisional Government. The contract used the tax collection rights of China's customs and salt administration as collateral to lend £25 million. During this period, Britain discovered that the Provisional Government had previously signed a loan contract with Germany for the construction of six destroyers. Therefore, on the grounds that it was also one of the six banks, Britain opposed Germany's unilateral acquisition of benefits, which ultimately caused the construction plan of these six destroyers to fail.

Afterwards, the Arnhold & Karberg & Co. unwilling to lose the opportunity, negotiated with the Beiyang government to change the £1.2 million originally intended for the construction of destroyers in German factories to the purchase of ships from Austro-Hungarian shipyards. Taking this opportunity, the two sides upgraded the order from the original 6 destroyers to 3 of the latest armored cruisers. At the same time, the Republic of China Navy also took the opportunity to negotiate with the Arnhold & Karberg & Co. to express its unwillingness to purchase the 12 destroyers originally intended for Austro-Hungary. In the end, the two sides reached an agreement to upgrade the contract to the purchase of a new armored cruiser similar to the Austro-Hungarian Navy's SMS Admiral Spaun. The shipyard was changed to the Cantiere Navale Triestino in Montfalcone, Austro-Hungary, recommended by the Arnhold & Karberg & Co..

While SMS Saida, the improved version of SMS Admiral Spaun, was being fitted out at the Cantiere Navale Triestino, the keel of this ship was being laid at the same shipyard. The design of this ship was largely based on that of the SMS Saida, but due to the strengthening of the protective armor, the ship was slightly larger in size than the former. In addition, this ship surpassed the SMS Saida, its parent ship, in terms of power and firepower. Furthermore, radio was included as standard equipment in the design, supporting long-distance communication day and night.

The Construction of this ship began in Monfalcone in 1914, the hull number is 68. Due to the Austro-Hungarian Navy's covetousness of this cruiser, modifications were made to the design to suit their own habits in the early stages of construction. With the Italian army's occupation of Monfalcone in 1915, construction of these ships was halted in June of the same year. In 1917, with China severing diplomatic relations with Germany and Austria-Hungary in protest against Germany's unrestricted submarine warfare, Austria-Hungary took direct control of the unfinished ship after recapturing Monfalcone in October of the same year.

In 1918, with the dismantling of the Austro-Hungarian Empire after the end of World War I, it is presumed that the cruiser, which was still under construction, was dismantled.

Ship	Builder	Armament	Armor	Displacement	Propulsion	Cost	Service			
Ship	Builder	Armament	Armor	Displacement	Propulsion	Cost	Laid down	Launched	Commissioned	Fate
68	Austria-Hungary Cantiere Navale Triestino	4 × 210 millimetres (8 in)	102 millimetres (4.0 in)（水线）	4,900 tonnes (4,823 long tons) (Note: Other sources record the placement as 4,800 tonnes (4,724 long tons).)	14 Yarrow water-tube boiler, 2 Parsons turbines，28 knots (52 km/h; 32 mph)，37,000 indicated horsepower (28,000 kW)	880,000 pounds (including ammunition)	Spring of 1915	—	—	Dismantled due to the defeat of the Austro-Hungarian Empire in World War I.
