= The Sino-Japanese War at Sea 1894 =

- Poster
- Traditional Chinese: 一八九四·甲午大海戰
- Simplified Chinese: 一八九四·甲午大海战
- Hanyu Pinyin: Yībājiǔsì Jiǎwǔ Dàhaǐzhàn
- Directed by: Feng Xiaoning
- Written by: Feng Xiaoning
- Produced by: Han Sanping; Wang Yafei; Yan Xiaoming
- Starring: Lu Yi; Xia Yu; Gong Jie; Ebusi Yonglin; Yang Lixin; Sun Haiying; Lü Liping; Ma Guangze; Guo Jiaming; Zhaxi Dunzhu; Hua Xin; Gao Jun; Feng Feng; Hirata Yasuyuki; Miura Kenichi; Ye Feng
- Cinematography: Feng Xiaoning
- Edited by: Feng Xiaoning
- Music by: Laozai
- Production companies: China Film Group Corporation; CCTV-6; Time Publication Medium Group Corporation
- Release date: 6 July 2012
- Running time: 120 minutes
- Country: China
- Languages: Mandarin; Japanese

The Sino-Japanese War at Sea 1894 is a 2012 Chinese historical war film directed and written by Feng Xiaoning, starring Lu Yi, Xia Yu and others. It is based on the events in the First Sino-Japanese War of 1894–1895, with emphasis on the naval battles and the career of the Chinese naval officer Deng Shichang. The film premiered in China at the International Convention Centre in Weihai, Shandong, on 26 June 2012.

== Plot ==
The Sino-Japanese War at Sea 1894 is set in the late 19th century and based on the events of the First Sino-Japanese War (1894–95), which was fought between the Qing Empire of China and the Empire of Japan.

A young Deng Shichang enrols in the Fujian Naval Academy, where he meets his future colleagues such as Liu Buchan and Fang Boqian. In 1877, Liu, Fang, and others travel to London to further their studies at the Royal Naval College while Deng remains in China. Some years later, Deng visits his classmates in London and meets Itō Sukeyuki, who is also studying there.

The Guangxu Emperor wants to modernise and reform China but his efforts are hindered by Empress Dowager Cixi, who effectively controls the emperor and the Qing government. The Qing Empire's Beiyang Fleet is formed in the 1880s and is one of the largest naval fleets in Asia at the time. In 1886, after the Nagasaki incident breaks out, the Meiji Emperor of Japan feels threatened by the Beiyang Fleet's prowess, so he initiates a plan to strengthen and enhance the Imperial Japanese Navy. Meanwhile, in China, the state funds originally designated for upgrading the Beiyang Fleet are used to renovate the Summer Palace to celebrate the empress dowager's 60th birthday.

The First Sino-Japanese War breaks out in 1894. The navies of the two empires clash at the battles of Pungdo and the Yellow Sea. At the Yellow Sea, after an exchange of gunfire between warships from both sides over a few hours, most of the Beiyang Fleet is destroyed while not a single Japanese ship is sunk even though the Japanese ships also sustained heavy damage. Deng Shichang's ship, the Zhiyuan, has been badly damaged. Deng gives orders for the Zhiyuan to ram the Japanese flagship Yoshino, but the Zhiyuan is sunk before it makes contact with the Yoshino. Deng stubbornly refuses to escape with the survivors and eventually drowns at sea with his pet dog.

After their victory at the Yellow Sea, the Japanese follow up by launching a land invasion and win the Battle of Lüshun, after which they massacre the city's population. In the following year, the Japanese score another victory at the Battle of Weihaiwei; the Qing admiral Ding Ruchang commits suicide after his defeat. Itō Sukeyuki writes to Liu Buchan, his old classmate from the Royal Naval College, and asks him to surrender. Liu refuses and kills himself after blowing up his own warship. On 14 January 1895, the Japanese annex the Diaoyu Islands and rename them "Senkaku Islands".

The Qing Empire agrees to hold peace talks with Japan and appoints Viceroy Li Hongzhang as its representative to negotiate with the Japanese Prime Minister Itō Hirobumi and Foreign Minister Mutsu Munemitsu in Shimonoseki. Japan demands that the Qing Empire cedes Taiwan, Penghu, and the Liaodong Peninsula, and pay war reparations amounting to 250 million silver taels, among other things. Li rejects the terms and leaves. He is shot in the cheek by a Japanese fanatic on the way back. While recovering in hospital, he receives a telegraph from the Qing government instructing him to accept the Japanese terms. He signs the Treaty of Shimonoseki on 17 April 1895.

Before the film ends, the narrator of the film drops an old photograph of Deng Shichang and his classmates at the Fujian Naval Academy into the sea. The photograph sinks to the bottom of the sea and comes to rest in the wreckage of a warship.

== Cast ==
- Lu Yi as Deng Shichang, the captain of the Zhiyuan.
  - Lan Tian as Deng Shichang (young)
- Xia Yu as Itō Sukeyuki, the Commander-in-Chief of the Japanese Combined Fleet.
- Yang Lixin as Ding Ruchang, an admiral of the Beiyang Fleet.
- Ma Guangze as Liu Buchan, an admiral of the Beiyang Fleet.
  - Lin Zijun as Liu Buchan (young)
- Gong Jie as Liu Buchan's sister
  - Feng Weiduo as Liu Buchan's sister (young)
- Guo Jiaming as the Guangxu Emperor, the nominal ruler of the Qing Empire.
- Sun Haiying as Li Hongzhang, a top minister and diplomat of the Qing Empire.
- Lü Liping as Empress Dowager Cixi, the empress dowager who effectively controlled the Qing Empire.
- Hua Xin as Fang Boqian, the captain of the Jiyuan.
  - Liu Chao as Fang Boqian (young)
- Ebusi Yonglin as the Meiji Emperor, the ruler of the Empire of Japan.
- Hirata Yasuyuki as Itō Hirobumi, the Japanese Prime Minister.
- Miura Kenichi as Mutsu Munemitsu, the Japanese Foreign Minister.
- Ye Feng as Tsuboi Kōzō, a Japanese admiral who commanded the Yoshino.
- Feng Feng as the narrator of the film

== Production ==
Feng Xiaoning revealed that the screenplay for The Sino-Japanese War at Sea 1894 was created over a period of 22 years. Qi Qizhang, the history consultant for the film, is the president of the China First Sino-Japanese War Research Association and was 90 years old when the film was released in 2012. Feng said, "When Mr Qi Qizhang first read my screenplay, he remarked, 'This is the best script about the First Sino-Japanese War I've seen in my life.'" Feng also consulted other history experts such as Xu Hua from the Military Museum of the Chinese People's Revolution and Chen Yue from the Naval History Research Association. They worked closely together to finalise the script and the lines spoken by the characters. The parts in the film about the Senkaku/Diaoyu Islands is based on research done by Qi over many years.

The shooting locations included Liugong Island in Shandong and Changshou Lake in Chongqing. The naval battle scenes were shot at Hulun Lake in Inner Mongolia.

Feng said that his intended target audience for the film is actually youths in China. He felt that they are lacking in moral values and self-awareness, so he wanted to portray Deng Shichang as an incorruptible and righteous hero in the late Qing dynasty – a period when Chinese society was in decline due to opium addiction and political corruption – and make him a role model for Chinese youths to emulate.

== Historical inaccuracies ==
- Naval officers in the late 19th century did not gather on a flagship to discuss battle plans. The commanding officers of a fleet often issue commands through flag signals.
- The depiction of the Nagasaki incident as being caused by Japanese nationalist mobs attacking Chinese sailors is not accurate.
- The Diaoyu Islands, the Paracel Islands, the Spratly Islands and the Scarborough Shoal were featured in the promotional materials of the movie but have nothing to do with the First Sino-Japanese War.
- Ding Ruchang committed suicide by overdosing on opium in real life while the film incorrectly depicted him committing suicide by using a revolver.

== Awards ==
Year	Award	Result	Notes
2012	China Movie Channel Media Awards - Best Film	Won	
2012	China Movie Channel Media Awards - Best Supporting Actor (Sun Haiying)	Won	
2012	8th Beijing Youth Welfare Film Festival - Special Award	Won	
2012	8th Chinese American Film Festival - Special Award	Won	
