= Lin Yongsheng =

Chinese Vice-Admiral (1853-1894)

Lin Yongsheng 林永昇
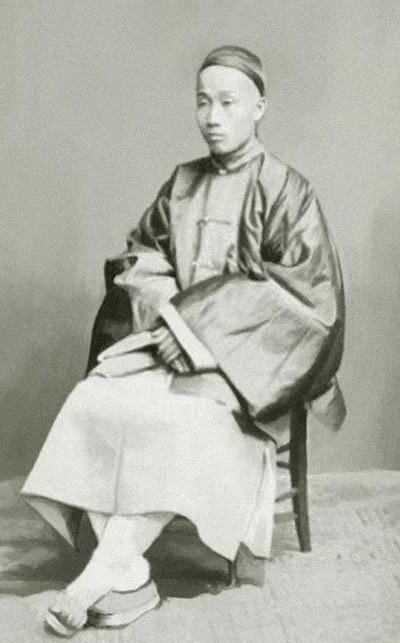
- Born: 1853; Houguan County, Fujian, China
- Died: September 17, 1894 (aged 40–41); Yalu River, Korea Bay
- Alma mater: Fujian Naval Academy
- Military career
- Allegiance: China
- Branch: Beiyang Fleet
- Service years: 1867–1894
- Rank: Vice Admiral
- Commands: Left Fleet of the Beiyang Fleet
- Conflicts: Imo Incident; First Sino-Japanese War: Battle of the Yalu River †

Lin Yongsheng, courtesy name Zhongqing was a Qing-era Chinese Vice Admiral. He was the commander of the Left Fleet of the Beiyang Fleet during the First Sino-Japanese War, serving aboard the Jingyuan.

== Education and organization ==
Lin Yongsheng was born into the prestigious Lin family which was a prominent family within Houguan County. In 1867, Lin was admitted to the first phase of the navigation department of Fujian Naval Academy. In 1871, he was transferred to the training ship Jianwei and served on the ship after graduation. In 1875, he was transferred to the cruiser Yangwu and later transferred back to the Naval Academy as a teacher with the rank of ensign.

In 1876, he was one of the first batch of 12 international students who traveled to the United Kingdom to study abroad. He arrived in the UK the following year and was admitted to the Navigation Department of the Royal Naval College, Greenwich. Lin then took an internship on HMS Minotaur and took the ship to travel the Mediterranean Sea and other places.

In 1880, Lin and five other classmates returned to China after finishing their studies. The Qing government promoted him to Lieutenant junior rank. Under the command of Li Hongzhang, Lin Yongsheng was transferred to the Beiyang Fleet as the commander of the gunboat Zhenzhong and later transferred to the commander of the training ship Kangji. In 1882, as a member of the Ding Ruchang's fleet, he went to the Korean Peninsula to suppress the Imo Incident. Because of his military service, he was promoted to lieutenant and awarded the honor of "Dai Hualing". In the spring of 1887, he and Deng Shichang, Ye Zugui, Qiu Baoren and others went to Germany and the United Kingdom to pick up state-of-the-art ships. Lin was responsible for picking up the armored cruiser Jingyuan in Germany where the Zhiyuan and Jingyuan would rendezvous. During the return of the four warships, they stopped in Singapore in November 1887 and opened the overseas Chinese to watch the warship. The four warships ordered from abroad returned safely in the spring of 1888 and Lin Yongsheng was promoted to Captain due to his achievements in taking over the ships.

In August of the same year, the four warships were formally commissioned and Lin Yongsheng continued to stay on the long-distance warships and continued to be in charge of the long-distance warships. On December 17, the establishment of the Beiyang Fleet was officially announced and Lin Yongsheng was appointed as the deputy commander of the left-wing fleet and the commander of the long-distance warship. According to the order of official ranks in the Beiyang Navy Charter, Lin Yongsheng was the sixth commander. Around this time, Lin was noted as being honest and kind-hearted and was described as " having a gentle and easy-going personality,... never reprimanding others in public ."

== First Sino-Japanese War ==
During the Battle of the Yalu River in the Yellow Sea on September 17, 1894, the Jingyuan was located on the right wing of the Beiyang Navy fleet, next to the Zhenyuan and the Jingyuan. After the Zhiyuan sank, the Jingyuan commanded by Lin Yongsheng, the Ji Yuan and Guangjia tried to leave the battlefield and return to the port of Lushun, but were chased by the first guerrillas of the Combined Fleet and finally were besieged by the first guerrillas. Lin Yongsheng was hit by a shell during the battle and was killed in action. Afterwards, the first officer and the second officer on board were shot and killed one after another. At 17:29 on the same day, the ship suffered heavy damage, capsized and sank. Only 17 people on board survived. After the war, the Qing court, in recognition of his service, paid compensation according to the rules of the admiral and posthumously promoted him to Vice Admiral.
