= Laiyuan (disambiguation) =

Laiyuan may refer to:

- Laiyuan County (涞源县), of Baoding, Hebei
- Chinese cruiser Laiyuan (來遠), armoured cruiser of the Beiyang Fleet during the Qing dynasty
- Laiyuan, Qi County, Shanxi (来远镇), town in Qi County, Shanxi
