= Chinese torpedo boat Fulong =

Chinese Navy vessel

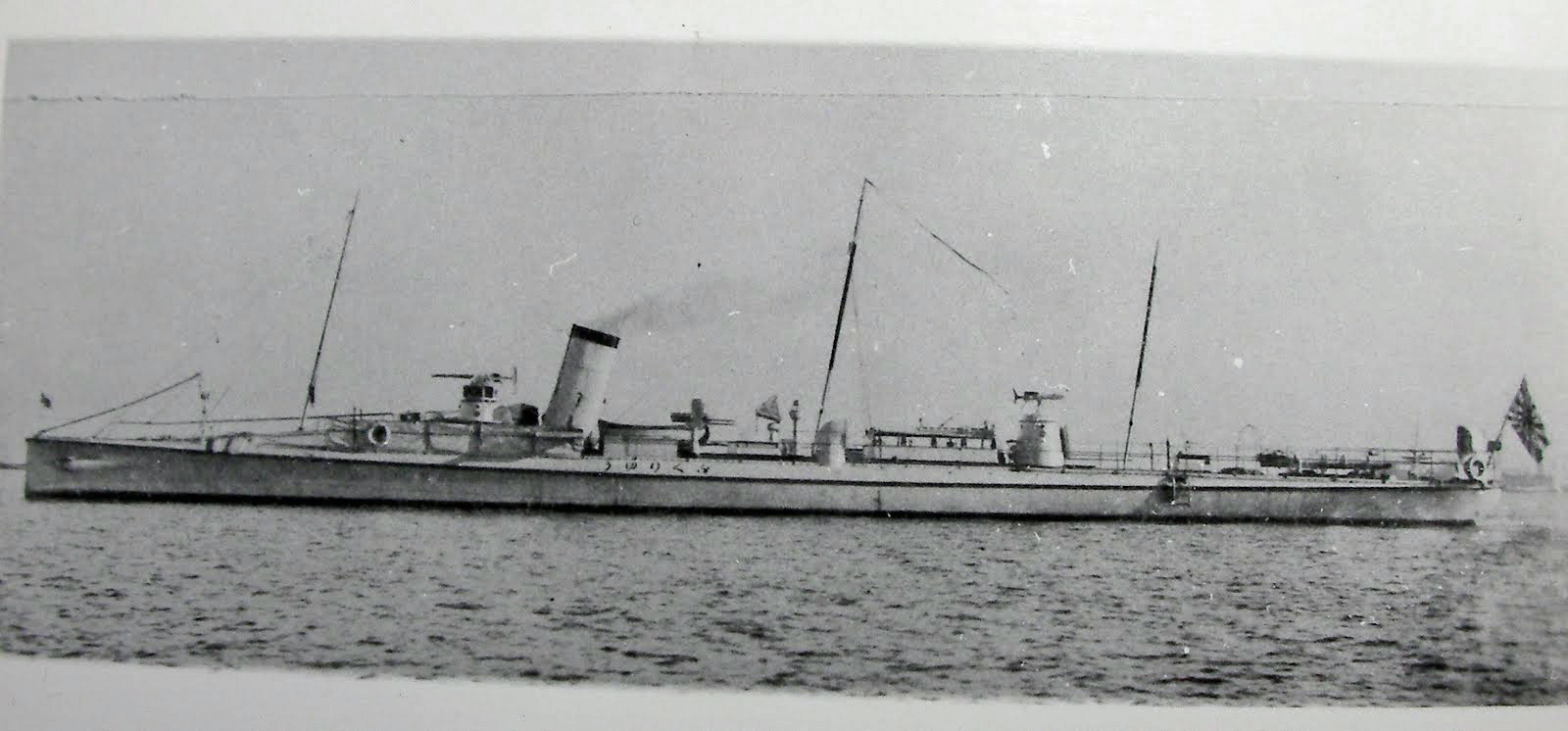
- Japanese Fukuryū at Sasebo in 1901

History

Imperial China
- Name: Fulong
- Ordered: 1884
- Builder: Schichau, Elbing, Germany
- Launched: 1886
- Commissioned: 24 September 1886
- Fate: Captured by Imperial Japanese Navy, 7 February 1895

Empire of Japan
- Name: Fukuryū
- Acquired: captured 7 February 1895
- In service: 27 February 1895
- Fate: Sold for scrap 1 April 1908

General characteristics
- Type: Torpedo boat
- Displacement: 120 long tons (122 t)
- Length: 144.3 ft (44 m)
- Beam: 16.5 ft (5 m)
- Draft: 5 ft (2 m)
- Installed power: 1,597 ihp (1,191 kW)
- Propulsion: 1 x reciprocating engine; 1 boiler
- Speed: 24.2 knots (44.8 km/h; 27.8 mph)
- Complement: 20
- Armament: 3 × 14 in (360 mm) torpedo tubes; 2 x 37 mm guns

Fulong (simplified Chinese: 福龙; traditional Chinese: 福龍; pinyin: Fulong; Wade–Giles: Fu Lung) was a torpedo boat built for the Imperial Chinese Navy, assigned to the Beiyang Fleet. She was built by Schichau in Elbing, Germany. Initially ordered by the Fujian Fleet, the ship was launched in 1886 and was China's largest torpedo boat at that point. The vessel saw service during the First Sino-Japanese War in the Battle of the Yalu River, and later at the Battle of Weihaiwei, where she was captured by the Japanese. The torpedo boat was taken into service by the Imperial Japanese Navy as Fukuryū (Japanese reading of 福龍) and remained active until sold for scrap in 1908.

== Design ==
The Imperial Chinese Navy invested heavily in torpedo boats towards the end of the 19th century, with some 43 listed at the time of the First Sino-Japanese War. These have subsequently been organised into alphabetical classes, with Fulong being the sole boat of the Type H class, and the largest boat ordered so far. She was built by Schichau at their shipyard in Elbing, Germany. Fulong measured 144.3 feet (44.0 m) long overall, with a beam of 16.5 feet (5.0 m) and an average draft of 5 feet (1.5 m) which increased to 7.2 feet (2.2 m) at full load. The hull was constructed out of steel, with the ship equipped with a single funnel and two conning towers.

Her main armament was three 14-inch (360 mm) torpedo tubes. Two of them were located in torpedo rooms on both sides of the bows. The third one was on the truck which was located on the stern. There were Schwartzkopff torpedoes in store. Sources conflict as to whether a third tube was present, but reports of three torpedoes being fired in rapid succession at the Battle of Weihaiwei indicates that a third tube was present. There was a secondary armament of two 37 millimetres (1.5 in) guns. Fulong had a complement of 20 officers and men. She had a coal-fired reciprocating engine, with a single boiler and shaft. This produced 1,597 indicated horsepower (1,191 kW), which enabled the vessel to reach a speed of 24.2 knots (44.8 km/h; 27.8 mph).

== Service history ==
=== Chinese service ===
She left for China in June 1886, sailing from Germany to Fuzhou, China, under her own power and was assigned to the Beiyang Fleet. Fulong was involved in two battles of the First Sino-Japanese War. At the Battle of the Yalu River on 17 September 1894, Fulong arrived as part of a relief force for the Chinese forces, alongside the gunboats Pingyuan and Guangbing, and fellow torpedo boat Zuo 1. They approached to the north of the engaged Chinese and Japanese fleets, preventing a flying wing of Japanese ships from encircling the opposition fleet. The group remained together, with the Japanese forces attempting to avoid them, instead targeting the ships of the main force.

The group engaged the rear of the Japanese fleet, with Fulong firing three torpedoes at the converted merchantman Saikyo Maru, including one which passed under the ship. Saikyo Maru was carrying the Chief of Navy General Staff, Vice Admiral Kabayama Sukenori. After several hours of battle, with dusk approaching, the Japanese fleet turned their main attention to Pingyuan and her escorts, but as darkness fell, the Japanese withdrew due to the risk of torpedo attack from Fulong and Zuo 1 with no torpedo boats of their own able to act in defence. The combined Chinese fleet sailed into Port Arthur to assess the damage inflicted.

At the start of the following year, Fulong under the command of Captain Zai Tingan, was among several ships at Weihai in the Battle of Weihaiwei. The Chinese fleet was blockaded in the harbour by the Japanese Combined Fleet, with night time raids by Japanese torpedo boats sinking and damaging Chinese vessels. No retaliatory attacks were ordered using the several Chinese torpedo boats in the harbour, and their first involvement in the battle was when they attempted to flee en masse through the Japanese blockade on 7 February.

Several were sunk or captured with a total of 13 torpedo boats lost by China in this single engagement; Fulong is thought to have been one of two boats which were pursued by the Japanese cruisers Yoshino and Takachiho. It managed to beach itself at Yantai, with the crew abandoning ship. Fulong was captured and towed by to the Japanese fleet by one of their torpedo boats during the following day. It remains in doubt whether the Chinese torpedo boats were ordered to flee by Admiral Ding Ruchang, the commanding officer of the ships at Weihaiwei. A memorial following the battle stated that those on the torpedo boats had run away from battle, and if any members of their crews were found, they should be summary decapitated. However, this command must not have been fully carried out, since Captain Zai was promoted several years later to Vice-Admiral.

=== Japanese service ===
Fulong was renamed Fukuryū in Japanese service, and was one of several vessels captured during the First Sino-Japanese War inducted into the Imperial Japanese Navy. Prior to the Russo-Japanese War, she was included in the fifth torpedo boat division alongside three numbered boats. She was stricken from the Navy List in 1908, and subsequently broken up.
