= Fang Boqian =

Naval officer of the Beiyang Fleet

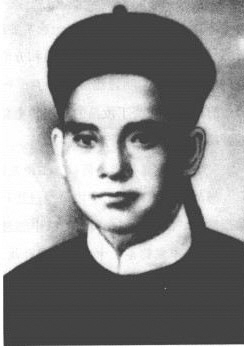
- Born: January 14, 1854; Houguan county, Fuzhou, Qing China
- Died: September 24, 1894 (aged 40); Lushun, Liaoning, Qing China
- Military career
- Allegiance: Qing dynasty
- Branch: Imperial Chinese Navy
- Rank: Admiral
- Conflicts: First Sino-Japanese War: Battle of Pungdo; Battle of the Yalu River

Fang Boqian (1854–1894) was a Chinese admiral who served the Qing dynasty under the Imperial Chinese Navy. He was a high-ranking officer of the Beiyang Fleet, he was the captain of the protective cruiser Jiyuan during the First Sino-Japanese War, but was executed after the Battle of the Yalu River for desertion.

== Early life ==
Boqian was born on January 14, 1854, and was the eldest son of four brothers. His father was a teacher at a private school. In 1867, at the age of 15, he entered the Fujin Ship Seigakudo and studied navigation. Years after graduation, in 1871, Liu Buchan, Lin Taizeng, Lin Yongsheng and Ye Zugui was out riding on the training ship "TateTakeshi" to the voyage of the first modern Chinese navy history together. The destinations of the voyage were Tianjin, Singapore and Penang Island.

In 1877, the Qing government sent Fang Boqian to study abroad in Europe aboard the Square HakuKen for the United Kingdom at the Old Royal Naval College where he learned a high degree of voyage surgery enrolled in October 1877, and returned in May 1880.

Meanwhile, in 1878, Captain Nathaniel Bowden-Smith under the command of Bacchante-class corvette HMS Euryalus boarded the ship which was headed for the Indian Ocean, from August 4, 1879. Captain Richard Edward Tracy boarded the Eclipse-class sloop and experienced a voyage in the world through the sea.

After returning to China, he served as the captain of the gunboats "Zhenxizhen" and "Zhenxizhen" and the training ship "Weiyuan". In 1885, he was promoted to Deputy General of the Beiyang Fleet Zuoying and became the captain of "Jiyuan". In 1892, the deputy general's term expired. Before the outbreak of the Sino-Japanese War, Fang Boqian sent a letter to Li Hongzhang, proposing that cruisers should be deployed faster and equipped.

In 1894, a rebellion broke out in Korea, and the Qing dynasty sent troops to calm the rebellion. Ding Ruchang, along with Captain Fang Boqian of "Jiyuan", escorted transport ships such as "Aijin" and "Flying Whale" and headed for Asan. At 4:00 am on July 25, "Jiyuan" returned after the transport ship landed all the horses and weapons. At 7:00 am, Jiyuan was attacked off the coast of Toyoshima by the Japanese Navy's protected cruisers Yoshino, Akitsushima and Naniwa. Jiyuan bombarded Yoshino and then returned to Weihai. The Battle of the Yalu River broke out at 11:00 am on September 17, and the battle situation became fierce. At around 3:30 pm, Captain Fang Boqian of Jiyuan left the battlefield and returned to Lushun, saying, "The ship was severely damaged, the bow was cracked and flooded, the gun could not be used, and it needed to be repaired." Captain Wu Keiei of Kwan Chia also fled. The withdrawal of Jiyuan and the destruction of the formation of the Beiyang Fleet was one of the causes of the Qing's defeat. In the early morning of the next day, Fang Boqian led Jiyuan and returned to Lushun. On the morning of September 19, Fang Boqian was ordered to tow the "Kwan" that had been stranded on Miyama Island. Since the grounding of "Hiroko" was so serious that it was not possible to tow with the "Jiyuan", he returned to Lushun with the crew of "Hiroko" on the morning of September 23.

In the early morning of September 24, 1894, while the Beiyang Fleet soldiers were still asleep, the Qing government sentenced Fang Boqian to be beheaded for desertion when he was 40 years old. This was considered a false charge. In February 1895, Sukeyuki Ito, Commander-in-Chief of the United Fleet of Japan, met with Beiyang Fleet's special envoy, Cheng Biguang, and asked, "Fang Boqian was familiar with naval battles at the Battle of Asan, but why did he kill him?" Biguang answered, "It was Ueinochi".
