= Lai Yuen =

- Chinese cruiser Laiyuan, a Beiyang Fleet cruiser that was hit and sunk in 1895 during the First Sino-Japanese War
- Lai Chi Kok Amusement Park, commonly known as "Lai Yuen", a Hong Kong amusement park from 1949 to 1997
