= Chinese cruiser Zhiyuan =

Imperial Chinese Navy's Zhiyuan-class protected cruiser

Coordinates: 39°12′50″N 123°07′35″E

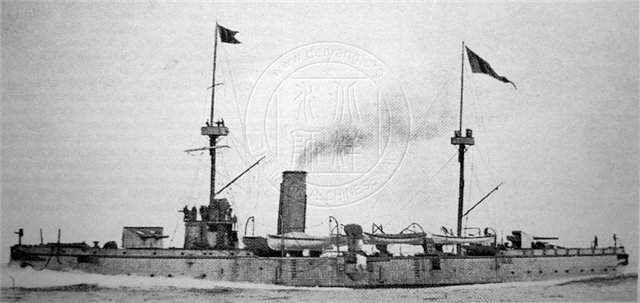
- Zhiyuan around 1894

History

Imperial China
- Name: Zhiyuan
- Ordered: October 1885
- Builder: Armstrong Whitworth, Elswick, England
- Laid down: 20 October 1885
- Launched: 29 September 1886
- Completed: 23 July 1887
- Fate: Sunk in combat, 17 September 1894

General characteristics
- Type: Zhiyuan-class protected cruiser
- Displacement: 2,300 long tons (2,300 t)
- Length: 268 ft (82 m)
- Beam: 38 ft (12 m)
- Draft: 15 ft (4.6 m)
- Propulsion: Compound-expansion steam engine, two screws; 4 x boilers
- Speed: 18 kn (33 km/h; 21 mph)
- Capacity: 510 tons of coal
- Complement: 204–260 officers and men
- Armament: 3 × 8 in (20 cm) Krupp guns; 2 × 6-inch (15 cm) Armstrong guns; 8 × QF 6-pounder Hotchkiss guns; 2 x QF 3-pounder Hotchkiss guns; 8 x 1-pounder guns; 6 x gatling guns; 4 × above water torpedo tubes
- Armor: Deck armour: 4 in (10 cm) (flat), 3 in (7.6 cm) (slope); Gun shields: 2 in (5.1 cm)

Zhiyuan (Chinese: 致遠; pinyin: Zhiyuan; Wade–Giles: Chih Yuen) was a protected cruiser built for the Imperial Chinese Navy by Armstrong Whitworth in Elswick, England. She was one of two Zhiyuan-class protected cruisers built, alongside her sister ship Jingyuen. Zhiyuan was armed with a smaller number of large sized naval guns, as opposed to later ships of this type (such as the British Pearl-class) which carried a larger number of smaller guns. This was because the medium-calibre quick-firing gun had yet to be introduced, thus a warship's firepower at the time was largely a function of individual shell weight rather than volume of fire. Both ships were assigned to the Beiyang Fleet, and she was captained by Deng Shichang throughout her life.

She was part of a flotilla which toured ports during the summer of 1889. Zhiyuan's sole action was at the Battle of the Yalu River on 17 September 1894 during the First Sino-Japanese War. During the battle, she came under heavy fire from the Japanese forces. Having been holed, Deng ordered for the ship to ram an opposing vessel. She was destroyed as she closed, either by a hit on one of her torpedo tubes, or from a Japanese torpedo. This attack, and the subsequent story of her captain and his dog have become embedded in popular culture in the People's Republic of China. A replica of the Zhiyuan was constructed in 2014 at the Port of Dandong, while the wreck was discovered in 2013 after a 16-year search.

== Design and description ==
At the time that Zhiyuan was ordered in October 1885, there was a debate in naval circles over the differences between armored cruisers and protected cruisers. Viceroy of Zhili province, Li Hongzhang, was in Europe to order ships from builders in Western nations. He was unable to decide between the two types, so in an experiment, he placed orders for two vessels of each type. The order for the two Zhiyuen-class cruiser protected cruisers was given to Armstrong Whitworth in Elswick, England, known as the leading builder of this type of vessels during this period.

Zhiyuen was 268 feet (82 metres) long overall. She had a beam of 38 ft (12 m) and a draught of 15 ft (4.6 m). Zhiyuen displaced 2,300 long tons (2,300 tonnes), and carried a crew of 204–260 officers and enlisted men. She was equipped with an internal protective armoured deck, which was 4 inches (10 centimetres) thick on the slopes and 3 in (7.6 cm) on the flat. The superstructure was divided into watertight compartments, and had a raised forecastle and poop, a single funnel, and two masts. She was powered by a compound-expansion steam engine with four boilers, driving two screws. This provided 6,850 indicated horsepower (5,110 kW) for a top speed of 18.5 knots (34.3 km/h; 21.3 mph). The ship was equipped with electrics and hydraulics throughout, which included the movement of the shot from the ammunition lockers to the guns.

Earlier protected cruisers, such as the Chinese cruiser Chaoyong had been equipped with a small number of 10 in (25 cm) main guns but, although larger than this ship, Zhiyuen was built with a higher freeboard to improve her seaworthiness over the smaller vessel. The resultant topweight considerations resulting from the desire to mount the main armament atop the forecastle and poop necessitated that she be armed with slightly smaller (and thus lighter) main guns than the Chaoyong. The main armament consisting of three breech-loading 8 in (20 cm) Krupp guns, two paired on a hydraulics powered rotating platform in front of the ship and a single gun mounted on a manual rotating platform in the stern, was still a powerful armament for a cruiser of her size. Both mounts were protected by 2 inches (5.1 cm) thick gun shields. The secondary armament consisted of two 6 in (15 cm) Armstrong guns mounted on sponsons on either side of the deck, compared to the four limited-traverse 4.7-inch breech-loading guns carried by the Chaoyong. The ship also had eight QF 6-pounder Hotchkiss guns on Vavasseur mountings, two QF 3-pounder Hotchkiss guns and eight 1-pounder guns to supplement her main guns in attack or for close-range torpedo defence. Zhiyuen was also equipped with weapons other than naval artillery, which included six gatling guns as well as four above water mounted torpedo tubes. One pair of the torpedo tubes was mounted forward, and another pair mounted aft where they were activated using electricity from the captain's cabin.

== Service history ==
Following the orders for the two protected cruisers by Li Hongzhang in October 1885, Zhiyuan was laid down later that month on 20 October. Construction continued throughout 1886, with the ship launched on 29 September. She was officially completed on 23 July 1887. Both Zhiyuan and her sister ship was Jingyuan were laid down at the same time, but despite Zhiyuen being launched six weeks earlier than Jingyuan, she was completed two weeks later than her sister.

Following completion, both ships, along with the two armored cruisers Jingyuan and Laiyuan, as well as a newly built Chinese torpedo boat, converged in the solent near Portsmouth in August 1887. Imperial Chinese Admiral William M. Lang, formerly of the Royal Navy, was sent back to Europe to take command of the squadron as they travelled to China. With the exception of a handful of Western advisors, the ships were manned by Chinese crews. Zhiyuen was under the command of Captain Deng Shichang. While in the Solent, they were inspected by Hongzhang. It had been anticipated that they would immediately be underway for the passage to China, but following the loss of an anchor and some urgent repairs, they left on 12 September. They arrived in Amoy (now Xiamen) in November, where they remained during the winter before joining up with the Beiyang Fleet in Shanghai in the spring.

During 1888, Zhiyuen was repainted along with the rest of the Chinese Navy, changing from the all grey scheme she had sailed from England with, to a combination of a black hull, white above the waterline and buff coloured funnels, typical of the Victorian era. In May 1889, Zhiyuen and the Beiyang Fleet were moved to fortify Weihaiwei (now Weihai). During the summer of that year, she was part of the flotilla led by Admiral Ding Ruchang, which travelled to Chefoo (now Yantai), Chemlupo (now Incheon, South Korea), and the Imperial Russian Navy base of Vladivostok. On the return leg of the journey, they stopped at Fusan (now Busan, South Korea).

=== Battle of the Yalu River ===
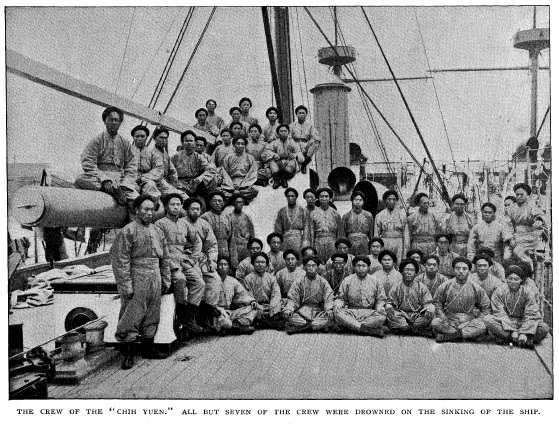
The crew of Zhiyuan around the time of the Sino-Japanese War, ca. 1894.

Zhiyuen first saw action during one of the opening engagements of the First Sino-Japanese War, in the Battle of the Yalu River on 17 September 1894. Each Chinese ship was paired with another in a supporting role in case of a signalling failure, with Zhiyuen and her sister ship grouped together. Shortly after the start of the battle, Admiral Ruchang's signalling mast aboard Dingyuan was disabled by its own weapons. This meant that the entire Chinese fleet operated in these pairs throughout the battle without any central organisation.

By 2:00 pm, Zhiyuen was engaged with the corvette Hiei, it having been left behind by the faster vessels of the main Japanese formation. Hiei broke from the engagement to pass directly between the two Dingyuan-class ironclads Dingyuan and Zhenyuan in an attempt to catch up with the other members of the formation, being greatly damaged in the process. A squadron of Japanese vessels consisting of the cruisers Yoshino, Takachiho, Akitsushima, and Naniwa operated together throughout the battle. As mid afternoon approached, the squadron turned their attention to Zhiyuan and her sister ship; the faster Japanese vessels circled the Chinese pair, raking them with fire. She began listing to starboard, having started taking on water from a hole in the hull.

Captain Deng gave the order for the ship to ram a Japanese cruiser, but as she closed, a hit by a 10 in (25 cm) shell on one of Zhiyuan's torpedo tubes caused an explosion; she sank at around 3:30 pm. Alternative reports have suggested that Zhiyuan was actually torpedoed. Of the 246 officers and men on board, only seven survived.

American Philo McGiffin, who was on board Zhenyuan, reported after the battle that there had been a variety of stories about the fate of the ship, but one that the survivors agreed on was the tale of the interaction between Captain Deng and his dog. As the ship went down, the captain ended up clinging to a piece of debris. However, his dog swam to him. Deng released the debris, and unable to swim, he drowned along with the dog. Chinese sources have subsequently stated Captain Deng made the decision to go down with Zhiyuan. In this retelling, the dog attempted to drag him to safety, but he refused to be moved and both died.

== Legacy ==
=== Popular culture ===
The story of Deng's order to ram the Yoshino and his subsequent refusal to leave his ship as it sank has resulted in him being placed in popular culture as a national hero, particularly following the formation of the People's Republic of China. Deng's heroism on the Zhiyuan are repeated in school textbooks, where the Chinese praise his actions while also criticising Li Hongzhang. The People's Liberation Army Navy training ship Shichang was named after Deng.

As a result, Zhiyuan has received many mentions and appearances in historical reenactments, such as the 1962 Changchun Film Studio movie Naval Battle of 1894 which concentrated on Deng's actions in the Battle of the Yalu River. This particular film ends in a sequence wherein Zhiyuan attempts to ram the Yoshino, before cutting to waves hitting rocks on a shoreline with Deng's face superimposed. Deng and the Zhiyuan appeared in the 2003 Chinese television series Towards the Republic, in which he was described as a strict but honourable captain whose ship's company respects him and his authority.

=== Reconstruction ===
To commemorate this period of history, in 2014, China invested 37 million yuan to construct a replica Zhiyuan under construction at the Port of Dandong, near to the mouth of the Yalu River. The construction of the replica was undertaken by Dandong Shipbuilding Heavy Industries Co., Ltd. at the same scale as the original. The new Zhiyuan will be a floating museum. Inside will be artifacts and records of Zhiyuan, the Beiyang Fleet, the First Sino-Japanese War and life-at-sea exhibits.

=== Excavation of the wreck ===
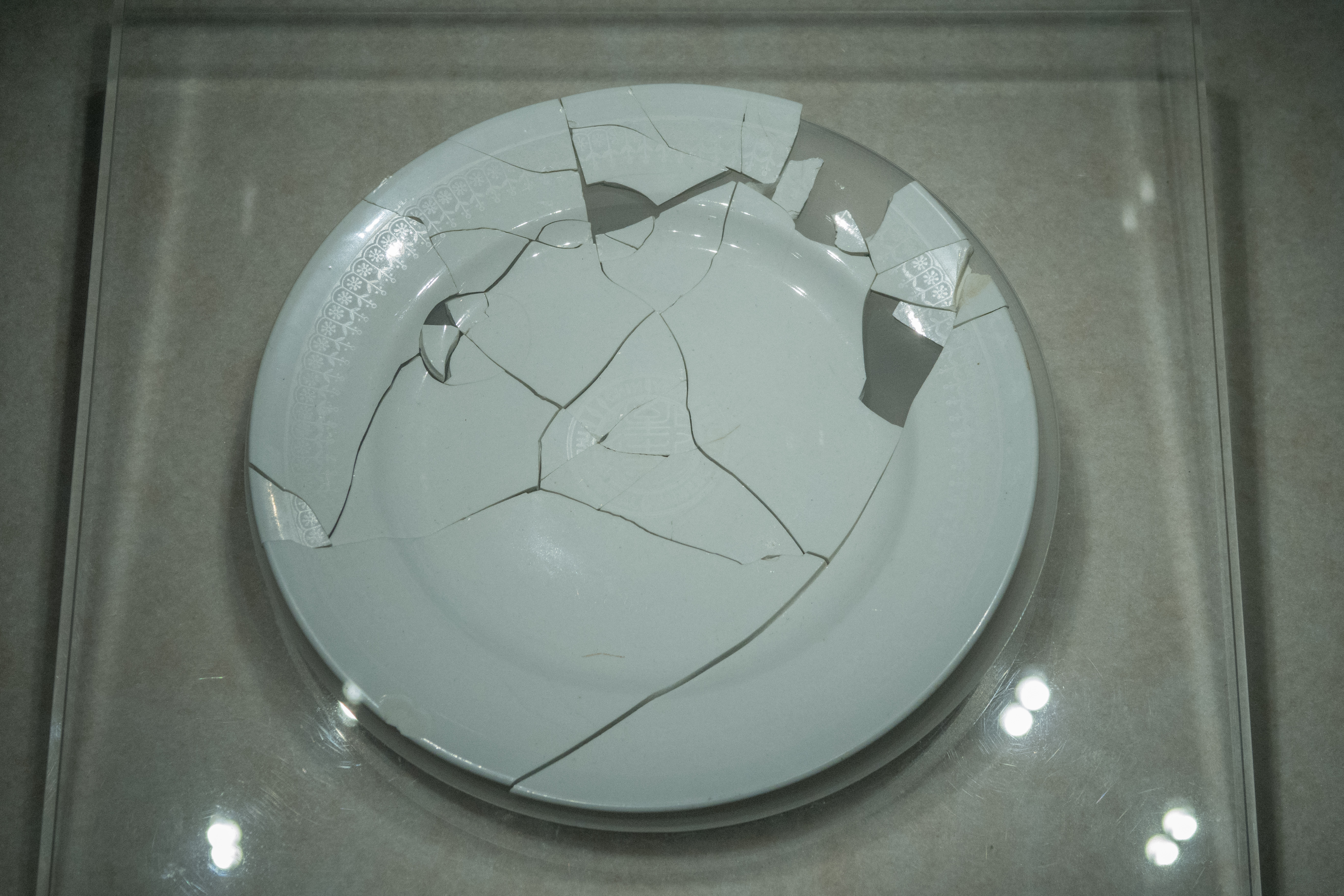
Porcelain plate with the name of Zhiyuan, excavated in 2015

From 1997 onwards, there have been attempts to locate the wreckage of the Zhiyuan. During a dredging process near the mouth of the Yalu discovered hull fragments from the Chinese vessels. In 2013, a shipwreck was discovered near Dandong Port and subsequently code-named "Dandong No 1". After an almost two year long investigation, it was officially confirmed as the wreck of Zhiyuan. Further excavation work then ensued 59 kilometres (37 mi) south of the Yalu. Over 100 items have since been salvaged from Zhiyuan, including weapons, parts of the ship, and items related to the daily life of the crew.

A broken china plate bearing the name of Zhiyuan was found, which helped to identify the vessel. Naval historian Chen Yue stressed the importance of finding common living items to those researching the Sino-Japanese War and expressed a high hope of discovering the official seal of the vessel. He said, "The ship seal was invariably made of good materials and stored in a sturdy box. It is highly possible that we can find it." During the excavation, the bodies of seven of the crew were recovered. The idea of floating the wreck was initially discontinued due to the risk of structural collapse, but plans to raise the vessel have not yet been finalized. It is intended for the artifacts to be displayed at a new museum, located in nearby Dandong.
