= Battle of the Yalu River (1894) =

Naval battle of the First Sino-Japanese War

Coordinates: 39°12′50″N 123°07′35″E

Battle of Yalu River
- Part of The First Sino-Japanese War
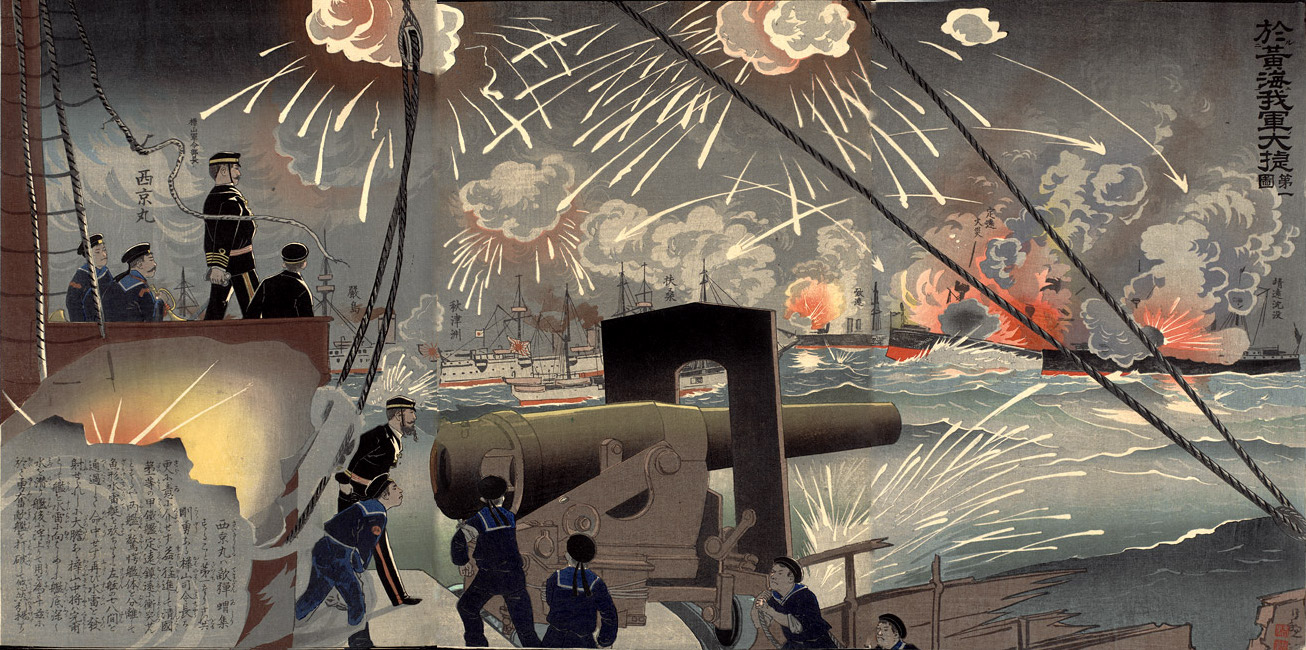
- Japanese troops firing at Qing ships at the Battle of the Yellow Sea, Kobayashi Kiyochika
Date	17 September 1894
Location	Yalu River, Korea Bay
Result	Japanese victory

Belligerents
Japan	China

Commanders and leaders
Itō Sukeyuki; Tsuboi Kōzō	Ding Ruchang; Liu Buchan; Deng Shichang †

Strength
7 protected cruisers 1 belted cruiser 2 ironclads 1 gunboat 1 transport ship	2 ironclad battleships 1 coastal battleship 2 armoured cruisers 3 protected cruisers 1 composite cruiser 2 light cruisers 1 gunboat 2 torpedo boats

Casualties and losses
380 killed and wounded 5 protected cruisers damaged 1 ironclad damaged	1,350 killed and wounded 1 protected cruiser sunk 1 armoured cruiser sunk 2 light cruisers sunk 1 composite cruiser scuttled

The Battle of the Yalu River (simplified Chinese: 黄海海战; traditional Chinese: 黃海海戰; pinyin: Huáng Hǎi Hǎizhàn; Japanese: 黄海海戦, romanized: Kōkai-kaisen; lit. 'Naval Battle of the Yellow Sea') was the largest naval engagement of the First Sino-Japanese War, and took place on 17 September 1894, the day after the Japanese victory at the land Battle of Pyongyang. The Imperial Japanese Navy defeated the Chinese Beiyang Fleet.

The battle is also known by a variety of other names: Battle of Haiyang Island, Battle of Dadonggou, Battle of the Yellow Sea and Battle of Yalu, after the location of the battle, which was in the Yellow Sea off the mouth of the Yalu River, not in the river itself. There is no agreement among contemporary sources on the exact numbers and composition of each fleet, but they were of a similar size, and the battle is considered to be one of the Imperial Japanese Navy's greatest victories.

== Background ==
=== Japan's strategy ===
Japan's initial strategy was to gain command of the sea, which was critical to its operations in Korea. Command of the sea would allow Japan to transport troops to the mainland. The Imperial Japanese Army's Fifth Division would land at Chemulpo on the western coast of Korea, both to engage and push Chinese forces northwest up the peninsula and to draw the Beiyang Fleet into the Yellow Sea, where it would be engaged in decisive battle. Depending on the outcome of this engagement, Japan would make one of three choices; If the Combined Fleet were to win decisively, the larger part of the Japanese army would undertake immediate landings on the coast between Shanhai Pass and Tianjin in order to defeat the Chinese army and bring the war to a swift conclusion. If the engagement were to be a draw and neither side gained control of the sea, the army would concentrate on the occupation of Korea. Lastly, if the Combined Fleet was defeated and consequently lost command of the sea, the bulk of the army would remain in Japan and prepare to repel a Chinese invasion, while the Fifth Division in Korea would be ordered to hang on and fight a rearguard action.

=== Chinese moves ===
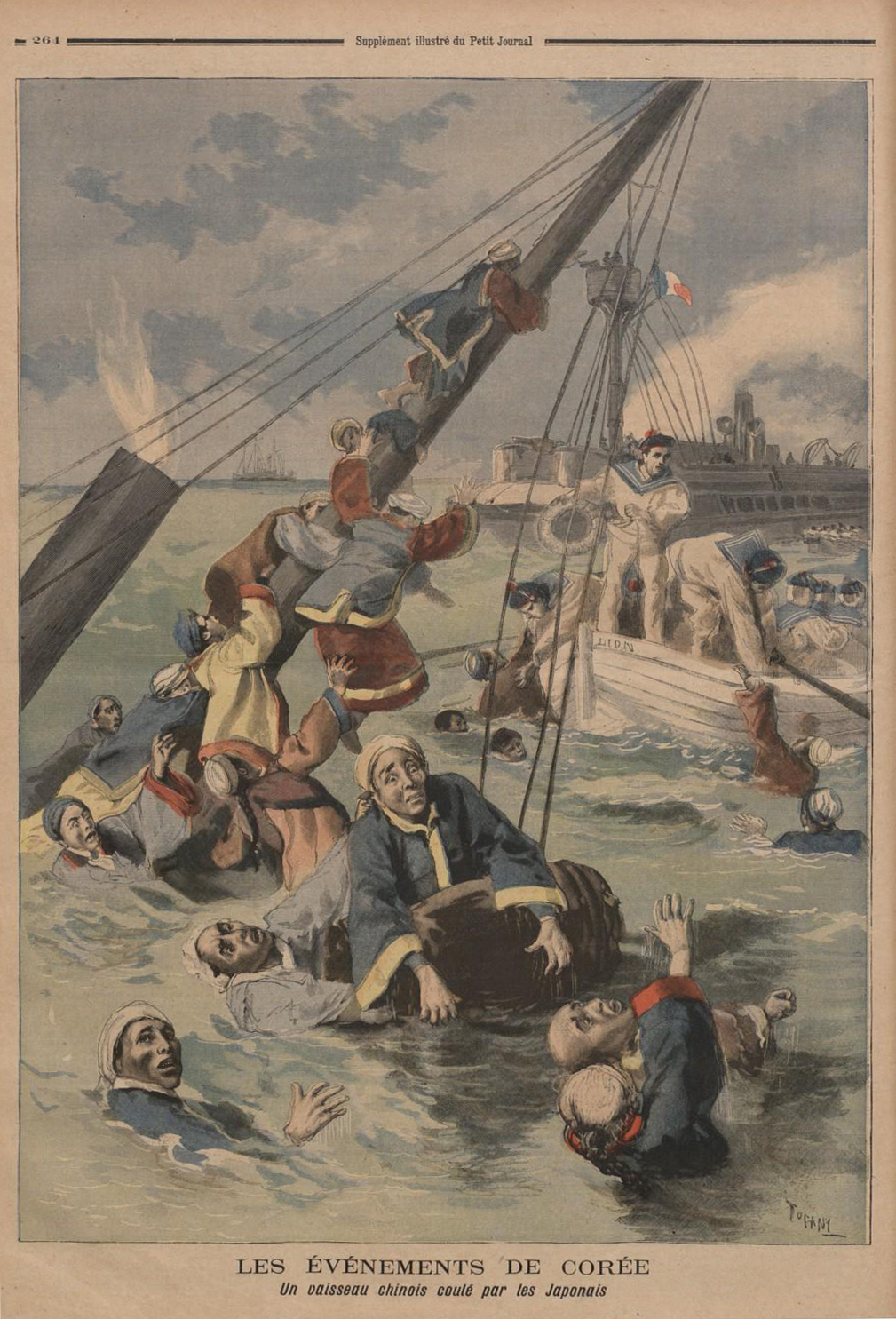
Illustration from the French newspaper Le Petit Journal, showing survivors from Kowshing being rescued by sailors from the French ship Le Lion

With tensions with Japan increasing over the situation on the peninsula, the Chinese government chartered three steamers to carry reinforcements to Korea in late July to bolster their position there. The three troopships were escorted by three naval vessels, the cruiser Jiyuan and the gunboats Kwang-yi and Tsao-kiang. A Japanese force consisting of the cruisers Akitsushima, Yoshino and Naniwa intercepted the three Chinese warships off Pungo Island, precipitating the action. Within one hour, the engagement ended in a Japanese victory, with Jiyuan forced to flee, Kwang-yi stranded on a shoal and Tsao-kiang captured. Although the first two of the three troopships arrived safely in Korea, on 25 July 1894, Naniwa intercepted the third, Kowshing, which was carrying 1,200 Chinese troops. When the Chinese troops on board refused to surrender or to be interned Naniwa sank the vessel. Over 800 Chinese soldiers died in the action.

Admiral Ding Ruchang had learned about the engagement at Pungdo on the morning of 26 July, when, at 6:00 am, the damaged cruiser Jiyuan arrived at Weihaiwei. Although the Chinese admiral had not been aware of the sinking of Kowshing, he considered the destruction of Kwang-yi and shelling of Jiyuan as an act of war. On the same day, without even notifying Li Hongzhang, he left Weihaiwei with eleven warships and seven torpedo boats and headed for the Korean coast, while the damaged Jiyuan sailed to Lüshunkou for repairs. After arriving in Korean waters on the morning of the following day, the Chinese ships cruised the area looking to engage the enemy. However, the abrupt change in the weather made the patrolling of the Korean waters more arduous, especially for the small torpedo boats and consequently the Chinese fleet returned to Weihaiwei on 28 July. The Chinese warships immediately resupplied themselves with coal while the weather improved, and the main force of the Beiyang Fleet was put to sea again on the following day but without the torpedo boats, heading for the Korean coast. This second cruise lasted longer, until 3 August, but the fleet did not encounter the Japanese.

At the beginning of September, Li Hongzhang decided to reinforce the Chinese forces at Pyongyang, by employing the Beiyang Fleet to escort transports to the mouth of the Taedong River. About 4,500 additional troops were to be redeployed, these had been stationed in the Zhili. On 12 September, half of the troops embarked at Taku on five specially chartered transports and headed to Dalian where two days later, on 14 September, they were joined by another 2,000 soldiers. Initially, Admiral Ding wanted to send the transports under a light escort with only a few ships, while the main force of the Beiyang Fleet would locate and operate directly against Combined Fleet, in order to prevent the Japanese from intercepting the convoy. However, the appearance near Weihaiwei of the Japanese cruisers Yoshino and Naniwa, which were on reconnaissance sortie, thwarted these plans. The Chinese mistook them for the main Japanese fleet. Consequently on 12 September, the entire Beiyang Fleet departed Dalian, heading for Weihaiwei and arriving near the Shandong Peninsula the following day. The Chinese warships spent the entire day cruising the area, waiting for the Japanese. However, since there was no sighting of the Japanese, Admiral Ding decided to return to Dalian, arriving there in the morning of 15 September.

The Japanese victory at Pyongyang had succeeded in pushing Chinese troops north to the Yalu River, in the process removing all effective Chinese military presence on the Korean peninsula. Shortly before the convoy's departure, Admiral Ding received a message concerning the battle at Pyongyang. Although it was rather inaccurate, it informed him about the defeat and subsequently made the redeployment of the troops to near the mouth of the Taedong River unnecessary. Admiral Ding, who then correctly assumed that the next Chinese line of defence would be established on the Yalu River, decided to redeploy the embarked soldiers there. On 16 September, at about 1:00 am, the convoy of five transport ships departed from the Dalian Bay under escort from the main force of the Beiyang Fleet which included the ironclad battleships Dingyuan and Zhenyuan, the small coastal defence battleship Pingyuan, the cruisers Jingyuen, Laiyuan, Jiyuan, Jingyuan and Zhiyuen, the small cruisers Yangwei, Chaoyong and Kwan Chia, torpedo gunboat Guangbing, the gunboats Zhennan and Zhenzhong as well as the torpedo boats Fulong and Zuo 1. They reached the mouth of the Yalu River at about 6:00 pm. The transports, escorted by Pingyuan, Guangbing, Zhennan, Zhenzhong, together with both torpedo boats, immediately steamed up the river and dropped their anchors approximately 12–13 nautical miles (22–24 km) from the mouth of the Yalu. The troops were disembarked and the landing operation lasted until the morning of 17 September. Meanwhile, the remaining warships of the Beiyang Fleet anchored in shallow waters about 7–8 nautical miles (13–15 km) from the shore, south-west of the mouth of the river, where they remained for the rest of the day and the entire night. On 17 September, at 9:20 am, the fleet left its position and conducted a one-and-a-half-hour training exercise before returning to their previous anchorage. Soon thereafter, at 11:28 am, observers on board the Chinese warships spotted smoke from unknown vessels heading from the south-west.

=== Fleet composition ===
The Japanese Combined Fleet consisted of two formations. A flying squadron, composed of the four fast cruisers Yoshino, Takachiho, Akitsushima, and Naniwa, was under the command of Tsuboi Kōzō. The main fleet consisted of the cruisers Matsushima (flagship), Chiyoda, Itsukushima, Hashidate, the ironclads Fusō, and Hiei, under the command of Admiral Itō Sukeyuki. There were also two dispatch vessels, the converted liner Saikyō Maru under the command of Swedish-born merchant navy captain John Wilson, and the gunboat Akagi. The Chief of Naval Staff, Admiral Kabayama Sukenori was on a tour of inspection and aboard Saikyō Maru.

Admiral Ding attempted to form his fleet into a southward-facing line abreast with the strongest ships (Dingyuan, Zhenyuan) in the center. The newer Jiyuan, Guangjia, Zhiyuan, Jingyuan, Laiyuan, Jingyuen, and the obsolete Chaoyong and Yangwei, were lined from left to right. The four-ship group led by Pingyuan, having escorted a convoy upriver, had to catch up, and only joined the action around 2:30 pm, in time to chase off Saikyō Maru.

The Beiyang Fleet had completed escorting a convoy to the mouth of the Yalu River, and was returning to its base at Lüshunkou when it was engaged by the Japanese Navy. On paper, the Beiyang Fleet had the superior ships, including two ironclad battleships, Dingyuan and Zhenyuan, for which the Japanese had no counterparts. The Beiyang Fleet could also call on the assistance of numerous military advisers, including Prussian Army major Constantin von Hanneken, recently from Korea, who was appointed as the naval adviser to Ding. W. F. Tyler, a sub-lieutenant in the Royal Navy Reserve and an Imperial Maritime Customs officer, was appointed as von Hanneken's assistant. Philo McGiffin, a graduate of the US Naval Academy at Annapolis and now a soldier of fortune and an instructor at the Weihaiwei Naval Academy, was appointed to Jingyuan as an adviser or co-commander.

However, examination reveals the truth about China's seemingly advantageous position, as most of their warships were over-age and obsolescent; the ships were also not maintained properly and indiscipline was common among their crews. The greater armour of major Chinese warships and the greater weight of broadside they could fire were more than offset by the number of quick-firing guns on most first-line Japanese warships, which gave the Japanese the edge in any sustained exchange of salvos. The worst feature of both Chinese battleships was actually their main armament; each was armed with short-barreled guns in twin barbettes mounted in echelon which could fire only in restricted arcs. The short barrels of the Chinese main armament meant that the shells had low muzzle velocities and poor penetration, and their accuracy was also poor at long ranges.

Tactically, Chinese naval vessels entered the war with only the crudest sets of instructions – ships that were assigned to designated pairs were to keep together and all ships were to fight end-on, as far forward from the beam as possible, a tactic dictated by the obsolescent arrangement of guns aboard Chinese warships. The only vague semblance of a fleet tactic was that all ships were to follow the visible movements of the flagship, an arrangement made necessary because the signal book used by the Chinese was written in English, a language with which few officers in the Beiyang Fleet had any familiarity.

Though well drilled, the Chinese had not engaged in sufficient gunnery practice beforehand. This lack of training was the direct result of a serious lack of ammunition. Corruption seems to have played a major role; many Chinese shells appear to have been filled with cement or porcelain, or were the wrong caliber and could not be fired. Philo McGiffin noted that many of the gunpowder charges were "thirteen years old and condemned". What little ammunition there was, was to be preserved for real battle. Live ammunition training was rarely carried out. Li wanted to delay the battle against the Japanese fleet, thus allowing the Chinese more time to equip their ships with additional ammunition. However, the Imperial Court called him a coward and his recommendation was turned down. The Chinese fleet was more numerous and armed with bigger guns. The Japanese fleet was much faster. As a result, the Japanese would have an advantage in open water.

== Battle ==
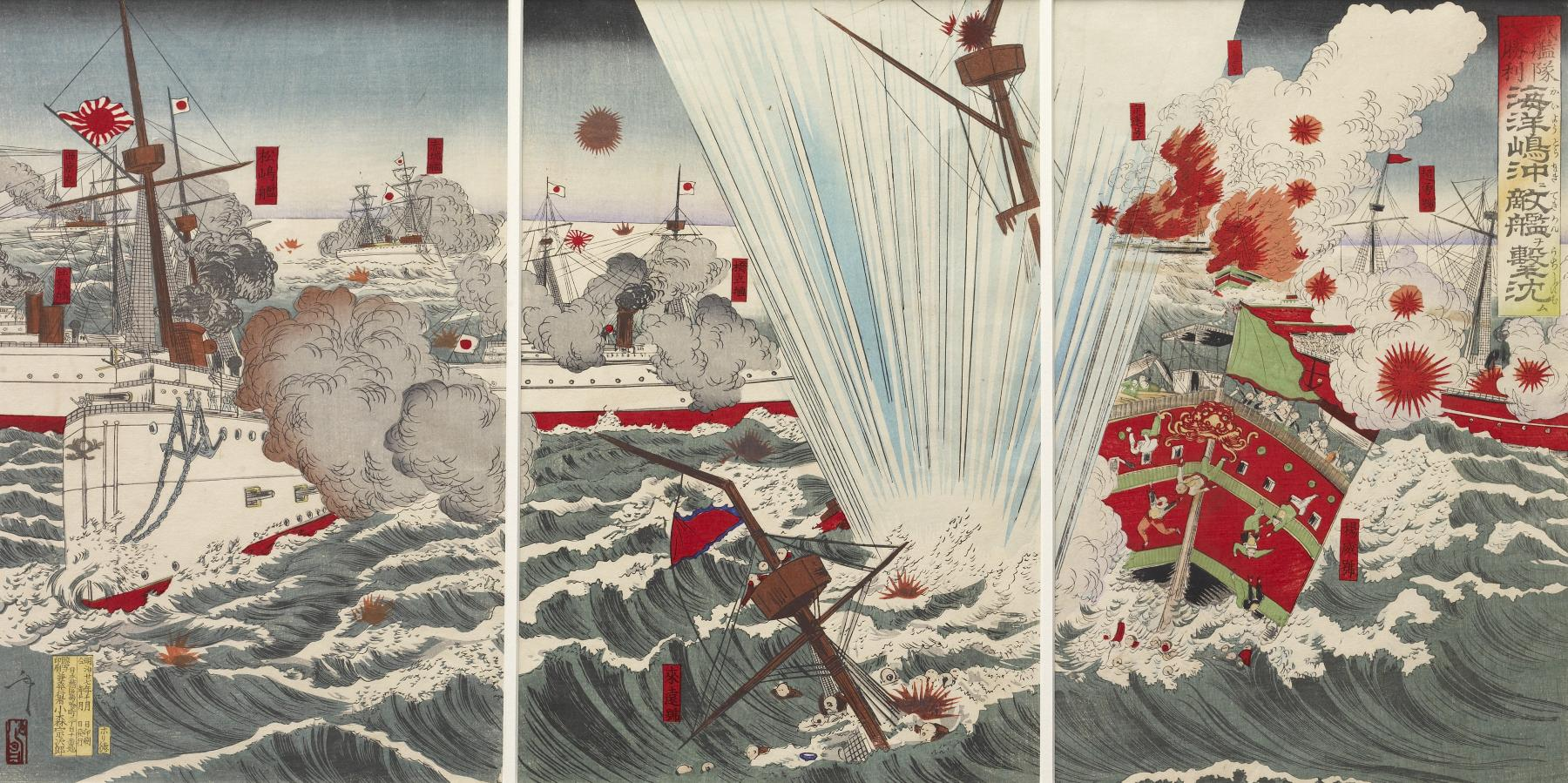
Japanese print depicting Matsushima (left) attacking Chinese warships, Shunsai Toshimasa, 1894

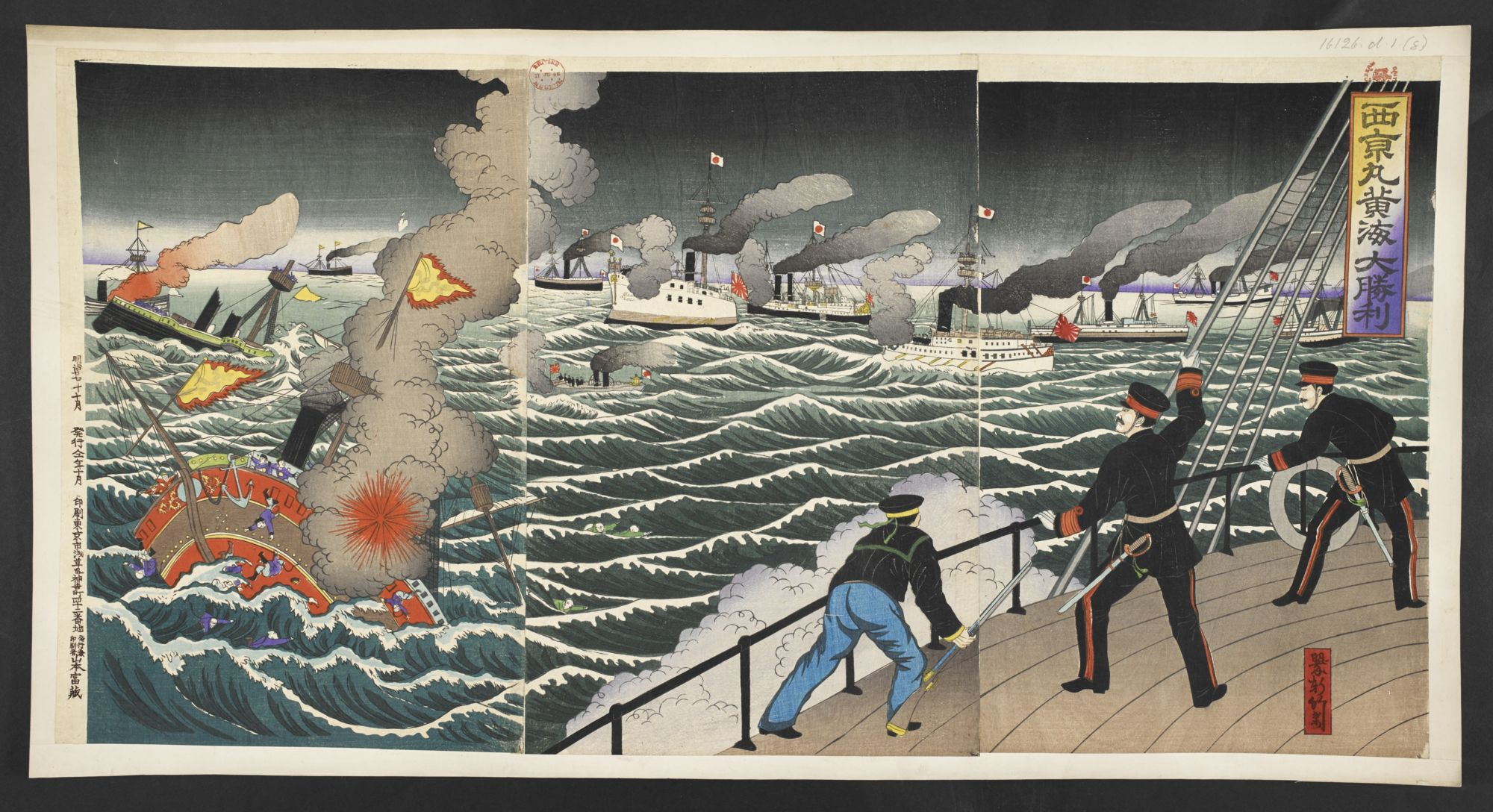
The Japanese warship Saikyōmaru at the Battle of the Yalu River, Hasegawa Chikuyō, 1894

=== Initial contact and engagement ===
Late in the morning the two fleets approached each other, in contrasting formations. The Chinese had intended to form a line abreast, but due to confusion in signals and the differing speeds of the ships, they were in a wedge formation, with the two battleships at the fore and the other vessels trailing behind on both flanks. The Japanese were in column formation with the Flying Squadron in front, followed by the main squadron.

When the enemy was well in sight Admiral Sukeyuki Ito ordered the Flying Squadron to attack the Beiyang Fleet's right flank. The Chinese opened fire at a range of 5,000 metres (5,500 yd), which was far too great to cause any damage. The Japanese, meanwhile, held their fire for another twenty minutes as they headed diagonally across the Beiyang Fleet at twice the speed. On the signal of Admiral Ito, the Japanese squadrons divided. The flying squadron under Tsuboi increased speed from 8 to 14 knots (15 to 26 km/h; 9.2 to 16.1 mph) and headed for the very centre of the Chinese formation; the tactic held the puzzled enemy in position. Turning slightly to port, the flying squadron then moved around the right flank of the Chinese formation to strike at the weakest units there. Holding fire until they were in effective range, the cruisers battered Chaoyong and Yangwei. The flying squadron then moved northward to engage Chinese reinforcements coming from the Yalu River.

The main squadron of the Japanese fleet initially followed the same course as the flying squadron towards the Chinese left but completed the turn all the way round to circle behind the Chinese fleet. As the flying squadron again turned south, the Beiyang Fleet was caught between the two Japanese squadrons. Dingyuan and Zhenyuan resisted the heaviest bombardment as a result of their armour; however, the quick firing Japanese guns decimated crews on their decks.

The Flying Squadron meanwhile re-engaged, sinking the cruiser Zhiyuan that had attempted to ram one of the Japanese cruisers, then set off in pursuit of one of several ships on the Chinese left which were deserting their fleet and had fled toward the shallow waters to the north. The squadron successfully hunted down and destroyed the cruiser Jingyuan, but in doing so inadvertently allowed the other Chinese vessels to escape. By this time the main Japanese squadron under Admiral Itō was circling what remained of the Chinese force, the major Japanese ships fired their heavy and quick-firing guns that swept the decks of the Chinese ships and smashed their superstructures. Many of the Japanese ships, however, also received major damage. Yoshino was hit and Akagi and Saikyō Maru were put out of action. Hiei also sustained serious damage as a result of her inferior speed, her captain decided not to try to follow the Flying Squadron on its sweep around the Chinese fleet, but instead to pass directly through the Chinese line. This maneuver made Hiei an easy target and it sustained a number of serious hits before the ship moved out of range. The damage to Matsushima, however, was the most severe; where the lack of armour was made apparent when she was struck by two 12-inch shells that tore open the deck and ignited ready ammunition causing nearly one hundred casualties and forcing Admiral Itō to transfer his flag to Hashidate.

By sunset the Beiyang Fleet's main formation was near the point of total collapse with both wings gone (the two ships of the Port wing had fled and four units of the Starboard wing destroyed); the four units of the centre were variously damaged and the two largest ships Dingyuan and Zhenyuan were nearly out of ammunition.

Several different explanations have been put forward as to why the Beiyang Fleet did not change their formation to react to the Japanese tactics more effectively. Per Royal Navy Lieutenant William Ferdinand Tyler, stationed on Dingyuan, Admiral Ding ordered his ships to change course in such a way that would have exposed his ship, the flagship, but put the rest of the squadron in a good position to fire on the Japanese fleet. However, Dingyuan's captain deliberately did not acknowledge this order or pass it on to the rest of the fleet. Instead, he ordered Dingyuan to fire its main guns before the Japanese were in range. The blast effects from the guns destroyed the flying bridge. Most of his staff officers on the bridge were likewise injured or killed. The situation was worsened when the Japanese destroyed Dingyuan's foremast, making it impossible for the flagship to signal the rest of the fleet. The Chinese fleet, with some foresight, had anticipated something like this happening and formed into three pairs of mutually supporting vessels to carry the fight on.

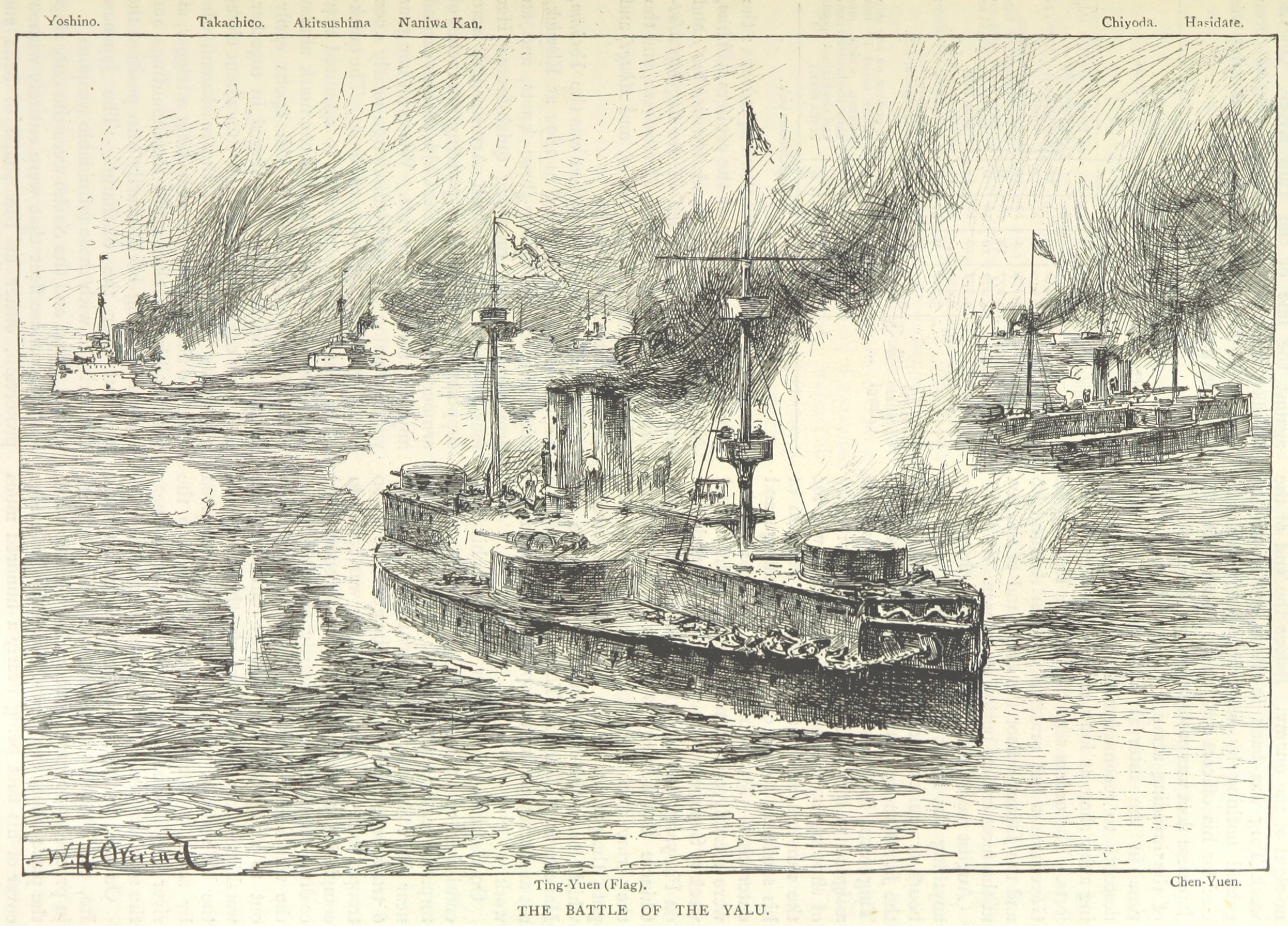
Illustration of Dingyuan and Zhenyuan under fire from the Japanese cruisers.

According to an account from James Allan, an officer aboard the U.S.-flagged supply ship Columbia, who witnessed the battle, rumors abounded that Admiral Ding deferred command to Major Constantin von Hannecken. He opined that it was not surprising that the Chinese had suffered such losses if an army officer was directing a naval fleet.

The Chinese fleet opened fire on the Japanese fleet as they passed from port to starboard, across the bows of the Chinese vessels. They failed to score any significant hits on the Japanese with their 12-inch (305 mm) and 8.2-inch (208 mm) guns. At about 2,700 metres (3,000 yd) (the Chinese had been steadily closing the range), the Japanese concentrated their fire on the right flank of the Chinese line, with devastating barrages poured into Chaoyong and Yangwei. Both those vessels burst into flames, because of their heavily varnished and polished wooden surfaces. Burning fiercely, both tried to save themselves by beaching.

As the Japanese ships opened fire, Jiyuan turned and fled, followed by Guangjia. Jiyuan was hit only once, while Guangjia became lost, ran aground, and was scuttled a few days later by its own crew. Some sources also say Jiyuan collided with Yangwei, causing her sinking.

The Japanese had intended to swing the flying division around the right flank of the Chinese line in an encirclement, but the timely arrival of the Kuang Ping and Pingyuan, along with the torpedo boats Fu Lung (built at Schichau) and Choi Ti (a Yarrow-built vessel), diverted this maneuver.

The Japanese fast cruisers veered to port and were then dispatched by Admiral Itoh to go to the assistance of Hiei, Saikyō Maru and Akagi, which had been unable to keep up with the main line, and had then been engaged by the left-hand vessels of the Chinese line when Saikyō Maru tried to finish off the beached Yangwei.

At 3:20 pm, the severely crippled and burning Zhiyuan tried to ram Naniwa (Chinese source says Yoshino) but failed. She sank along with her captain, Deng Shichang.

The Japanese fleet's more reliable, better-maintained ordnance and overwhelming superiority in rapid-firing guns gave it a tactical advantage over the Beiyang Fleet, which fought with limited stocks, consisting of older foreign ammunition and shoddy domestic products. Japanese shells set four Chinese vessels ablaze, destroying three. However, firefighting was well organized on the Chinese vessels. For example, Laiyuan burned severely, yet kept firing. Dingyuan stayed afloat and had casualties of 14 dead and 25 wounded. A total of about 850 Chinese sailors were killed in the battle, with 500 wounded.

The Chinese severely damaged four Japanese warships and lightly damaged two others. Japanese losses were roughly 180 killed and 200 wounded. The Japanese flagship Matsushima suffered the worst single-ship loss, with more than 100 dead or wounded after being hit by a heavy Chinese round. Hiei was severely damaged and retired from the conflict; Akagi suffered from heavy fire, with great loss of life. Saikyō Maru, the converted liner, urged on by Admiral Kabayama Sukenori despite its lack of offensive armament, had been hit by four 12-inch (305 mm) shells and was left sailing virtually out of control as a result.

== Analysis ==
As it was the first fleet encounter since Lissa in 1866, the battle was studied for its tactical lessons not only by the Japanese Navy General Staff, but by naval staffs around the globe. The lessons to a degree were unclear, since the two fleet encounters seemed to be contradictory and cancelled each other out. At Lissa, the Austrians had used the ram in a bows-on frontal attack, in a line abreast formation, whereas the Yalu had been won by broadside naval gunfire delivered from a line ahead formation. What also remained unresolved by the encounter was the debate between the proponents of the big gun and advocates of armor. Although the Canet guns of the Sankeikan-class cruisers had malfunctioned and thus the heaviest Japanese shells had not hit the two Chinese battleships, no other shells had penetrated their armor belts deeper than 4 inches.

However, there were some conclusions that could be drawn from the course and outcome of the battle. The first was that the line ahead was the best formation which preserved the greatest flexibility and simplicity of movement, minimized tactical confusion and also maximized broadside fire. The case against the line abreast formation was not yet absolutely certain, but the wedge formation adopted purposely or accidentally by the Chinese could only have been effective in the hands of a commander whose ship captains had mastered fleet movements, which Ding's subordinates had not. Secondly, the one common denominator between Lissa and the Yalu appeared to be that the victor had fought in separated squadrons. This arrangement provided tactical flexibility and consequently widened the options for maneuver during the chaos of battle.

Due to the Chinese Navy's weak preparations for the battle, faulty ammunition, and a lack of communication and discipline, which was the cause of at least one account of fragging, the Japanese forces were able to operate under very desirable conditions. Their victory in the battle established naval supremacy, demonstrated the weakness of the Chinese military, and by extension, the strength of their own. The New York Times would liken the battle to Waterloo.

== Aftermath ==
The remnants of the Beiyang Fleet retired into Lüshunkou for repairs, but were withdrawn to Weihaiwei to avoid a second encounter with the Japanese fleet during the Battle of Lüshunkou. The Japanese did not pursue the retreating ships, as Dingyuan and Zhenyuan were only slightly damaged, and the Japanese had no way of knowing that the battleships suffered from a lack of ammunition. What remained of the Beiyang Fleet was finally destroyed during a combined Japanese land and naval attack at Weihaiwei.

The defeat of the Beiyang Fleet at the Battle of Yalu River was a major propaganda victory for Japan, with many major European newspapers, including the London Times, Le Temps and Sankt-Peterburgskie Vedomosti, providing front-page coverage and crediting the Japanese victory to its rapid assimilation of western methods and technology. Many credited the prompt action of foreign advisers in the Beiyang Fleet (most notably McGiffin) from keeping the fleet from total annihilation, and for keeping even the most heavily damaged Chinese ships fighting until the very end of the engagement. Some contemporary military analysts, notably U.S. Secretary of the Navy Hilary A. Herbert, called the battle 'nearly a draw' – although the Chinese had lost several warships, the Japanese had suffered considerable damage, and if the Chinese ammunition had been of higher quality, the outcome might have been different. In addition to Herbert, several other American officials published analyses of the battle, including Alfred Thayer Mahan and William F. Halsey Sr.

However, other factors were responsible for the Chinese defeat such as that most of the Chinese ships were over-age, obsolescent and ill-maintained. Additionally undisciplined crews and deficient naval tactics were also at fault. Mark Peattie and Davids Evans state the principal factors in the Japanese victory was their superiority in firepower, particularly an overwhelming advantage in quick-firing guns which proved to be devastating in the hands of well-trained and disciplined gun crews. At the time fire control systems were in their infancy with significant advances still some years away, neither side achieved more than a fraction of hits out of the total number of rounds fired. A contemporary European diplomat also concurs, observing that Japan's naval "victories were due to the skill and daring of her sailors, and not to the ships which they manned".

The Chinese government, after initially denying that its fleet had been defeated, put the blame for the Chinese defeat on Viceroy Li Hongzhang and Admiral Ding Ruchang, both of whom were demoted and stripped of honors. Their subordinates and relatives suffered similar fates. However, both men remained in their posts, and would oversee the final destruction of the Beiyang Fleet at Weihaiwei. However, this attempt to save face were insufficient, as the foreign press would come to find that many of China's claims were false, discrediting them in the eyes of the international community. The Battle of the Yalu and the naval defeats of 1894–1895 in general have been the topic of extensive discussion among Chinese historians and naval officers since events held to mark the 120th anniversary in 2014.

While it was not the first battle involving pre-dreadnought technology on a wide scale (the Battle of Fuzhou in the 1884 Sino-French War predated it), there were significant lessons for naval observers to consider.

The Grand Council decided to replace Liu Kunyi by Zhang Zhidong as head of the Nanyang fleet, due to Liu's refusal to send reinforcements north from the fleet. Zhang began organising 5 cruisers from the Nanyang fleet to reinforce the Beiyang fleet which would negate the losses of the Beiyang fleet.

== Order of battle ==
=== Japan ===
Flying Squadron:

- Yoshino (4150 t, 20 knots (37 km/h), 4–6, 8–4.7) (Kawara Yōichi, RA Tsuboi Kōzō)
- Takachiho (3650 t, 15 knots (28 km/h), 2–10.2, 6–6) (Nomura Tadashi)
- Naniwa (3650 t, 16 knots (30 km/h), 2–10.2, 6–6) (Tōgō Heihachirō)
- Akitsushima (3150 t, 16 knots (30 km/h), 4–6, 6–4.7) (Kamimura Hikonojō)

Main Fleet:

- Matsushima (4277 t, 14 knots (26 km/h), 1–12.6, 12–4.7) (Omoto and Dewa Shigetō, VA Itō Sukeyuki) – Damaged
- Chiyoda (2450 t, 19kts, 10–4.7) (Uchida Masatoshi)
- Itsukushima (4277 t, 14 knots (26 km/h), 1–12.6, 11–4.7) (Arima Shin'ichi)
- Hashidate (as Itsukushima) (Hidaka Sōnojō)
- Fusō (3718 t, 11 knots (20 km/h), 4–9.4, 2–6) (Arai)
- Hiei (2200 t, 9 knots (17 km/h), 9–6) (Sakurai Kikunojō) – Damaged

Others:

- Akagi (615 t, 8 knots (15 km/h), 2–4.7) (Sakamoto Hachirota)
- Saikyō Maru (merchantman, 2913, 10 knots (19 km/h), small guns) (Kanō Yunoshin)

=== China (Beiyang Fleet) ===
Left Wing, left to right

- Jiyuan (2,355 t, 15 knots (28 km/h), 2–8.3, 1–5.9, 10MG, 4TT) (Fang Boqian) – Fled at start perhaps then collided with Chaoyung
- Kwan Chia (1,290 t, 16 knots (29.6 km/h), 1–4.7, 4–5, 8MG) (Wu Ching-jung) – Fled at start, ran aground, scuttled
- Zhiyuen (2,300 t, 18 knots (33 km/h), 3–8.3, 2–5.9, 16MG, 4TT) (Teng Shih-chang) – Sunk
- Dingyuan (flag, 7,355 t, 15 knots (28 km/h), 4–12.2, 2–5.9, 12MG,3TT) (Ding Ruchang & Liu Pu-chan)

Right Wing, left to right

- Zhenyuan (This vessel is known as Chen Yuen in Capt. McGiffin's reports) (7,430 t, 15 knots (28 km/h), 4–12.2, 2–5.9, 12MG, 3TT) (Lin Tai-tseng & McGiffin, Philo) – Left group to join flag. Damaged
- Laiyuan (2,830 t, 15 knots (28 km/h), 2–8.3, 2–5.9, 16MG, 4TT) (Chiu Pao-jen) – Aft on fire, damaged
- Jingyuan, 1887 (2,850 t, 15 knots (28 km/h), 2–8.3, 2–5.9. 8MG, 4TT) (Lin Yongsheng) – Caught fire, sank
- Jingyuen, 1886 (2,300 t, 18 knots (33 km/h), 3–8.3, 2–5.9, 16MG, 4TT) (Yeh Tus-kuei) – Stayed back to avoid shelling
- Chaoyong (1,350 t, 16 knots (30 km/h), 2–10, 4–4.7, 6MG) (Huang Chien-hsun) – Quickly caught fire, sank or beached
- Yangwei (1,350 t, 16 knots (30 km/h), 2–10, 4–4.7, 6MG) (Lin Li-chung) – Quickly caught fire, beached, wreck torpedoed next day

Joined Halfway, front to rear, moved to the right flank

- Pingyuan (2,100 t, 12 knots (22 km/h), 1–12.2, 2–6, 8MG, 4TT) (Li Ho-lien)
- Guangbing (1,000 t, 16 knots (30 km/h), 3–4.7, 8MG, 4TT) (Chen Pi-kuang)
- Fulong (torpedo-boat, 128 t, 15 knots (28 km/h), MGs, 3TT) (Choy)
- Zuo 1 (torpedo-boat, 69 t, 16 knots (30 km/h), MGs, 3TT) (?)

Order of battle party sourced from JC Perry's The Battle off the Tayang (1964).

== See also ==
- Henry Walton Grinnell
- Naval history of Japan
- Naval history of China
