= Hasegawa Chikuyō =

Hasegawa Chikuyō (長谷川 竹葉, fl. 1876–1889), also known under the art name Suiken Chikuyō (翠軒 竹葉), was a Japanese ukiyo-e print designer.

Hasegawa's birth and death dates are unknown. He was active during the early Meiji-period bunmei-kaika, when Japan was rapidly Westernizing and modernizing. Many of Hasegawa's works, as with those of contemporaries such as Hiroshige III, Kiyochika, and Kuniteru, document this period of change. Hasegawa's subjects include modern Western-influenced architecture and street scenes.

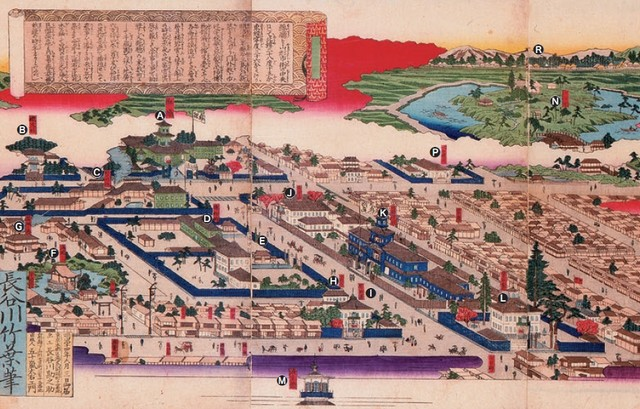
New buildings in Yamagata Prefecture, 1881

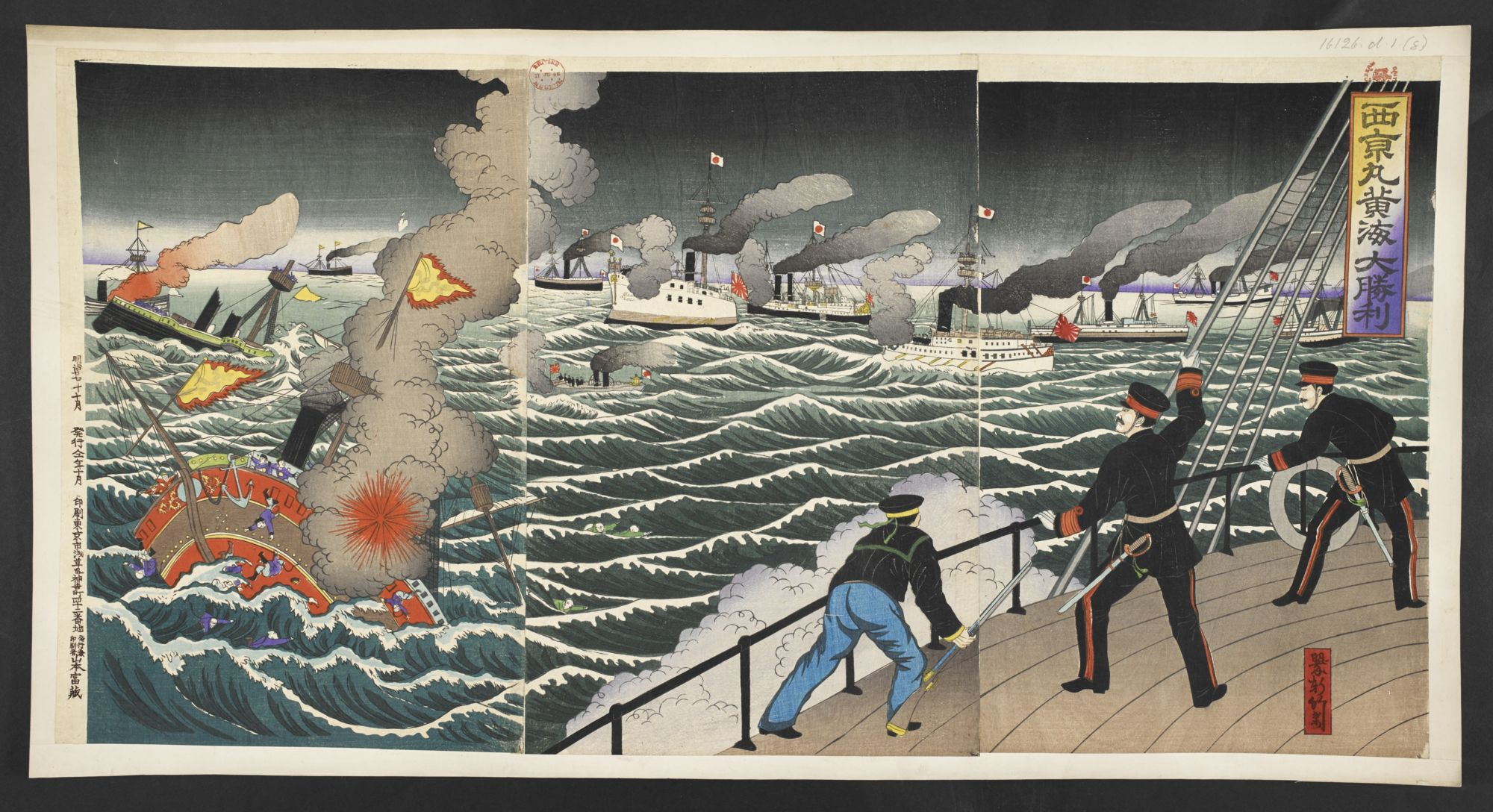
The Japanese warship Saikyō-maru at the Battle of the Yalu River, 1894
