= Toyoshima =

Toyoshima (written: 豊島 or 豊嶋) is a Japanese surname. Notable people with the surname include:

- Chikashi Toyoshima (豊島 近, born 1954), Japanese biophysicist
- Hajime Toyoshima (豊嶋 一, 1920–1944), Japanese airman and prisoner of war
- Machiko Toyoshima (豊嶋 真千子, born 1971), Japanese voice actress
- Masayuki Toyoshima (豊島 将之, born 1990), Japanese shogi player
- Shigeki Toyoshima (born 1971), Japanese high jumper
- Shohei Toyoshima (豊島 翔平, born 1989), Japanese rugby sevens player
- Tak Toyoshima (born 1971), American comic strip cartoonist
- Yōzō Toyoshima (豊島 陽蔵, 1852–1922), Japanese politician
- Yusaku Toyoshima (豊嶋 邑作, born 1991), Japanese footballer
