= Philo McGiffin =

US Navy officer

Philo Norton McGiffin
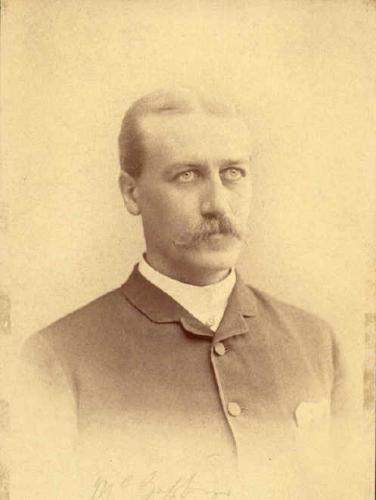
- Born: December 12, 1860; Washington, Pennsylvania
- Died: February 11, 1897 (aged 36); Manhattan, New York City
- Alma mater: United States Naval Academy
- Military career
- Allegiance: China
- Branch: Imperial Chinese Navy
- Unit: Beiyang Fleet
- Conflicts: First Sino-Japanese War; Battle of the Yalu River; Battle of Weihaiwei

Philo Norton McGiffin (December 12/13, 1860 – February 11, 1897) was an American mercenary serving in Chinese service as a naval advisor during the First Sino-Japanese War. Although primarily skilled as an instructor and administrator, he proved a talented tactician during the September 17, 1894 Battle of the Yalu River. He was the first American to command a modern battleship in wartime.

During the Battle of the Yalu River, McGiffin suffered severe head injuries from enemy shellfire. In the years following the battle, he was approaching total blindness, and experiencing mental instability from the effects of his wounds. He was hospitalized, but he committed suicide by shooting himself with a revolver which he had kept amongst his personal effect.

== Early life ==
Born to Civil War officer Colonel Norton McGiffin and Sarah Quail in Washington, Pennsylvania, McGiffin attended local Washington and Jefferson College before transferring to the U.S. Naval Academy in 1877. When he was about 12, his older brother Thomas, got into some trouble when he shot the high school principal. While Philo was at Annapolis, he gained a reputation as a practical joker. In 1884, McGiffin qualified as a passed midshipman but was among several classmates who were discharged with one year's pay when there were no available positions in the body of commissioned officers (in those days, several years of sea duty were required before receiving a commission. In an era of limited U.S. naval spending, only a few commissions were available to each graduating class. Unfortunately for McGiffin, when he took the exam in 1884 he did not score highly enough and so did not obtain one of the few commissions available that year).

== Service to Imperial China ==
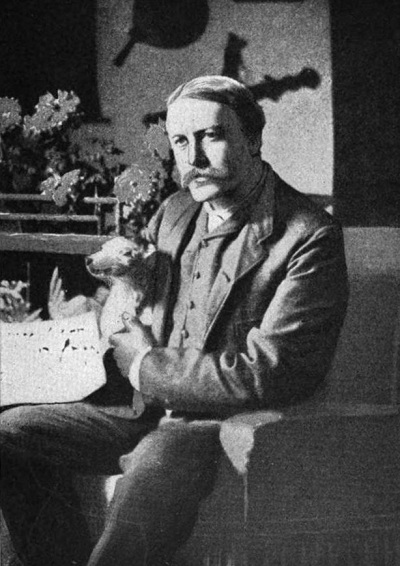
McGiffin as Superintendent of the Chinese Naval College, at the age of thirty-two

Arriving in China soon after and seeking employment, McGiffin was able to earn a commission as a lieutenant in the newly modernizing Imperial Chinese Navy under Li Hung-chang in early 1885. In the midst of the Sino-French War, McGiffin was said to have captured a French gunboat in June before the end of the war that same year. A professor at the Chinese Naval College in Tientsin (Tianjin) for the next nine years, McGiffin was also said to have served as naval constructor supervising the construction of four ironclad warships in Great Britain before the outbreak of the First Sino-Japanese War in August 1894.

== Later career ==
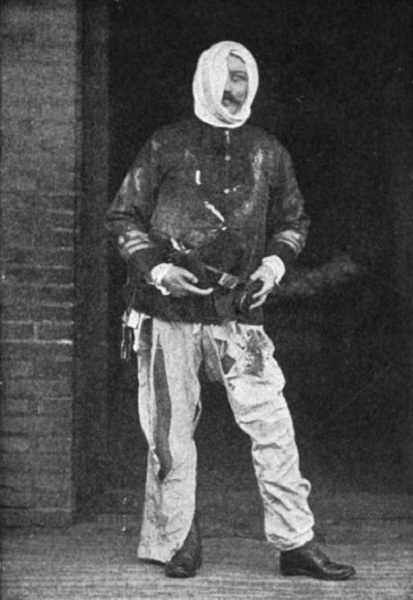
McGiffen in hospital after the Battle of the Yalu

McGiffin was assigned to Admiral Ting Ju ch'ang's Beiyang fleet (literally "Northern Fleet"). The fleet was partially organized and trained by McGiffin, and he would serve as an executive officer aboard the Chinese battleship Zhen Yuan during the Battle of the Yalu River (1894). During that battle he had received severe head injuries from enemy shellfire and returned to the United States. Approaching total blindness, and experiencing mental instability from the effects of his wounds, he was eventually committed to the Post Graduate Hospital in New York, where he had kept his revolver amongst his personal effects, and eventually shot himself on February 11, 1897.

== Folk hero ==
At the United States Naval Academy, Philo McGiffin is a folk hero akin to Pecos Bill or Paul Bunyan. In the most commonly told tale, McGiffin could not sleep one evening and decided since he could not sleep, no one else should, so he collected all the cannonballs in the academy yard, hauled them up to the top floor of the quarters (which probably would have been what was then known as the "New Quarters"), and rolled them down the stairs to the bottom floor. Since the heavy iron balls were wreaking havoc, no one could stop him until the Officer of the Watch shimmied up a drainpipe and apprehended him from behind. Only half mythical, according to Richard Harding Davidson's biographical sketch of McGiffin quoted in Real Soldiers of Fortune, the cannonballs were already in a pile on the top floor of the quarters. For this prank he was sent to the Santee (an old hulk of a sailing ship that served as the confinement barracks for Midshipmen being disciplined) where he befriended an old man-o-warsman named Mike. When Philo returned to the Regiment of Midshipmen from the Santee, Mike gave him six charges of powder, which he loaded into six of the Mexican War cannons scattered about the Yard and fired a salute on July first, shattering windows all over the academy.

Another popular Naval Academy urban legend concerns the most exacting inspection at the academy, the inspection for the members of the oncoming Watch, traditionally held each evening in the Rotunda of Bancroft Hall. Popular lore has it that McGiffin waited, hidden on the balcony above the Watch Squad, until the very second before the Officer of the Watch left his office to inspect the Squad, at which point he stood up and dumped a bag of flour all over the Watch Squad. This is extremely unlikely as the legends place this action in the Rotunda, which did not exist in Philo's day and there is no indication that there even was a Watch Squad inspection in the late 1870s/early 1880s; in fact, given the rather casual attitude toward uniforms prevalent in those days, it was quite unlikely. However, in the late 1960s an event of this nature was rumored to have actually occurred, as well as a bowling ball being rolled down the steps of Memorial Hall and out to the Rotunda where a watch squad inspection was in progress. Similar incidents occurred regularly after then, particularly during the week prior to the Army-Navy football game.

== Legacy ==
Philo McGiffin
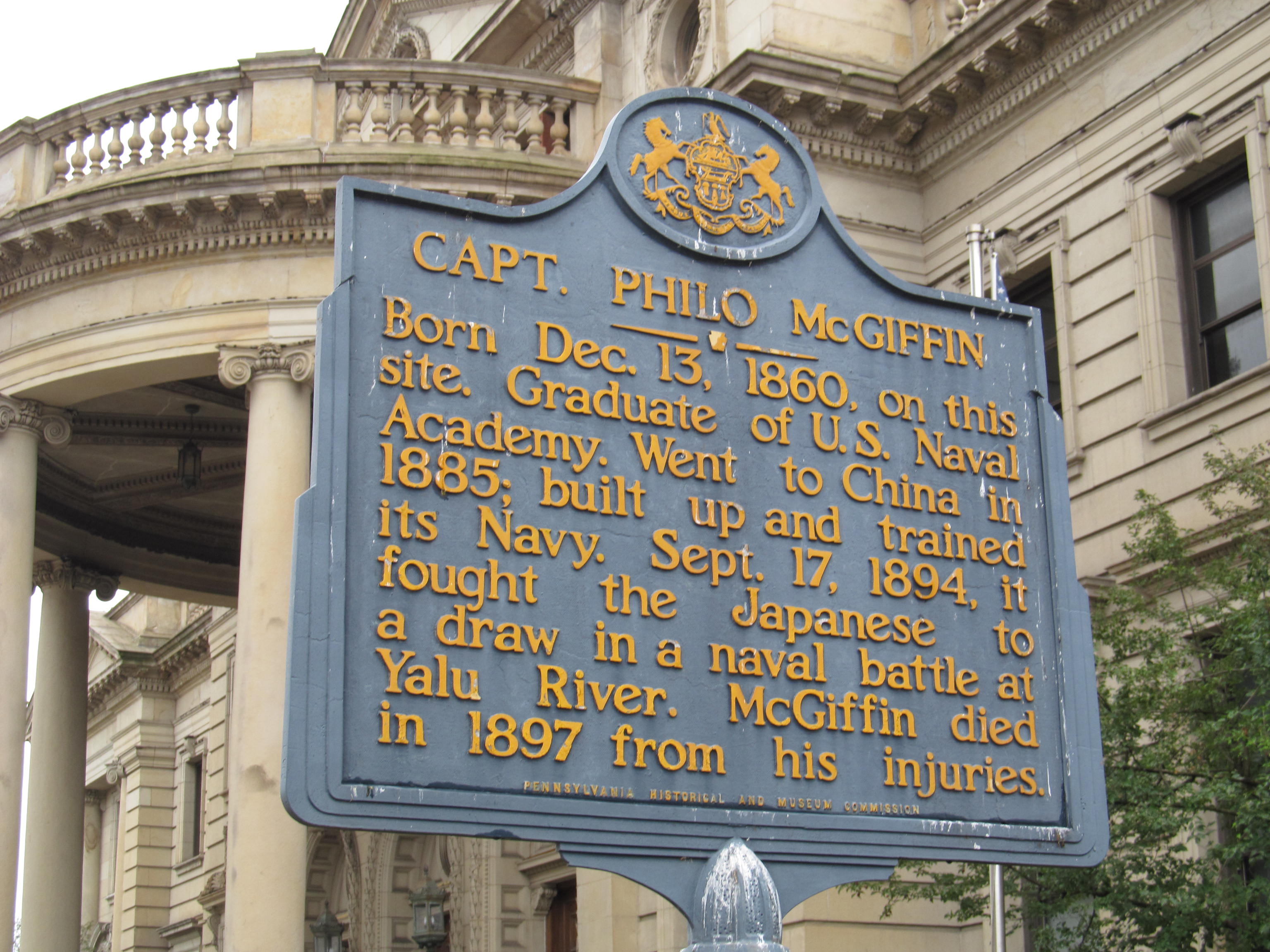
- Pennsylvania Historical and Museum Commission marker

- Location within Pennsylvania
- 40.1707°N 80.24558°W
- Location: In front of Washington County Courthouse

In addition to several works which discuss his actual exploits, McGiffin is memorialized in the comic novel The Return of Philo T. McGiffin, written by Naval Academy graduate David Poyer and published in 1983 by St. Martin's Press. The book tells of the misadventures of a namesake plebe, Philo T. McGiffin, during his first year at the academy.

The Hong Kong Maritime Museum displays a number of McGiffin's personal belongings including: his uniform jacket from the Battle of the Yellow Sea, sword and porcelain collection.

In 1947, the Pennsylvania Historical and Museum Commission installed a historical marker outside the Washington County Courthouse, noting the McGiffin's historic importance.
