= Chinese ironclad Pingyuan =

First Chinese-built armored ship

Coordinates: 38.9500°N 120.9333°E

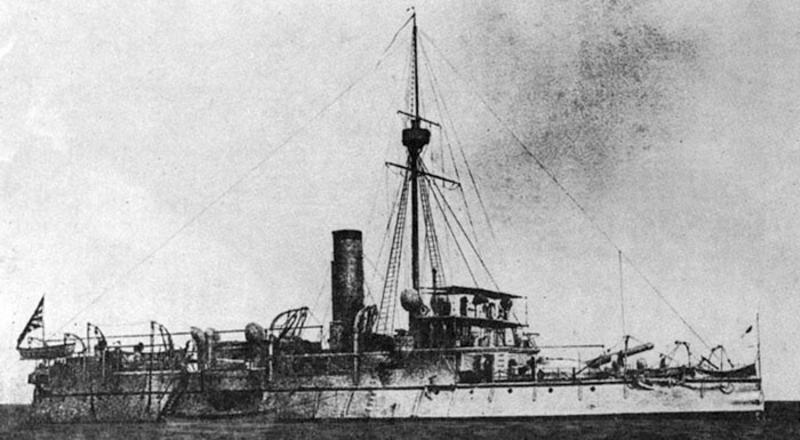
- Heien

History

China
- Name: Pingyuan
- Builder: Foochow Arsenal, Mawei, China
- Yard number: 29
- Launched: 29 January 1888
- Completed: 1890
- Fate: Captured by Japan, 17 February 1895

Empire of Japan
- Name: Ping Yuen Go (1895); Heien (1900)
- Acquired: 17 February 1895
- Renamed: Heien in 1900
- Fate: Mined off Pigeon Bay (Piegen Bay) west of Port Arthur, 18 September 1904

General characteristics
- Displacement: 2,150 long tons (2,185 t)
- Length: 60.96 m (200 ft) w/l
- Beam: 12.19 m (40 ft)
- Draft: 4.19 m (13 ft 9 in)
- Propulsion: 2-shaft reciprocating triple expansion steam engine, 2,400 shp (1,790 kW); 2 boilers; 350 tons coal
- Speed: 10.5 knots (12.1 mph; 19.4 km/h)
- Complement: 202
- Armament: 1 × 260 mm (10 in) gun; 2 × 150 mm (6 in) guns; 2 × 57 mm (2 in) machine guns; 2 × 47 mm (2 in) machine guns; 4 × 37.5 mm (1 in) machine guns; 3 × 18 in (457 mm) torpedo tubes
- Armor: Belt: 203 mm (8 in); Deck: 50 mm (2 in); Turret: 203 mm (8 in); Conning tower: 127 mm (5 in)

Heien (Japanese: 平遠), originally known as Pingyuan (Chinese: 平遠; pinyin: Píngyuǎn), was an ironclad coastal battleship that served with the Imperial Chinese Beiyang Fleet and later the Imperial Japanese Navy. It was built by the Mawei Navy Yard near Fuzhou. Previous transliterations of its Chinese name include Ping Yuen and Ping Yuan, and an alternative transliteration of its Japanese name was Heiyen.

== Characteristics ==
Shortly after launch, Pingyuan was armed with one 263 mm Krupp rifled breechloading main gun. The secondary battery consisted of two 15 cm Krupp guns. There were 8 quick firing guns and facilities to launch 4 torpedoes.

== Service record ==
=== Beiyang Fleet ===
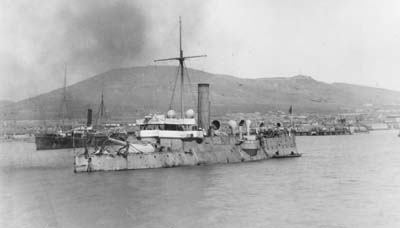
Pingyuan

As part of the Beiyang Fleet, Pingyuan was at the Battle of the Yellow Sea/Yalu River during the First Sino-Japanese War. It was a Chinese armored cruiser built by the Mawei Navy Yard, modelled on the French Achéron-class ironclad gunboat. Pingyuan was firstly named Longwei (Chinese: 龍威; pinyin: Lóngwēi), and was the first Chinese-built ironclad, though some of its components were imported from abroad. Pingyuan was part of the Beiyang Fleet.

Pingyuan fought in the Battle of the Yalu River, damaging the Japanese flagship Matsushima, and was later captured as a prize of war in the siege of Weihaiwei.

=== Imperial Japanese Navy ===
After its capture in February 1895, by the Imperial Japanese Navy, Pingyuan was placed into active combat service as Pingyuan-go on 16 March 1895 and served with the Japanese fleet through the remainder of the First Sino-Japanese War. On 21 March 1898, she was re-designated as a first-class gunboat and was officially renamed Heien in 1900 based on the Japanese language pronunciation of its original Chinese name.

During the Russo-Japanese War, Heien was assigned to the 3rd Squadron and was part of the blockading force against the Imperial Russian Navy at the Battle of Port Arthur. Heien was disabled by a naval mine at Pigeon Bay (Piegen Bay), located to the west of Port Arthur on 18 September 1904 and foundered in heavy weather later that day. It was struck from the navy list on 21 May 1905.
