= Chinese cruiser Jingyuan (1887) =

Coordinates: 39°12′50″N 123°07′35″E

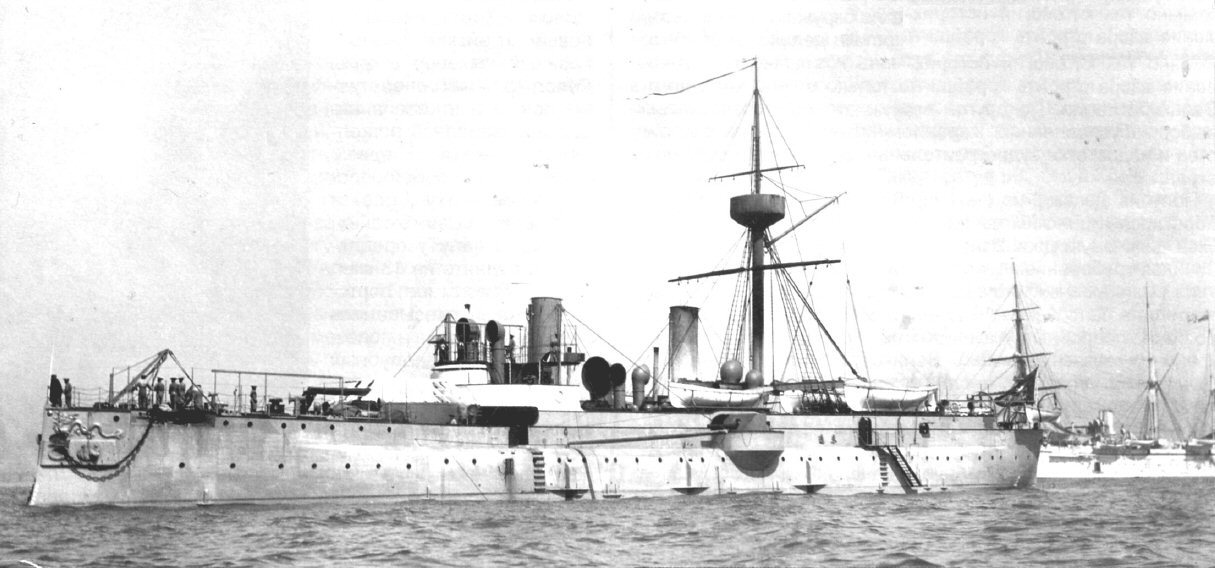
- King Yuen

History

Imperial China
- Name: Jingyuen
- Builder: Stettiner AG Vulcan,
- Cost: 865,000 silver tael
- Laid down: 1 January 1885
- Launched: 3 January 1887
- Completed: 1 January 1888
- Fate: Sunk in combat; 17 September 1894

General characteristics
- Type: Armored cruiser
- Displacement: 2,900 t (2,900 long tons)
- Length: 82.4 m (270 ft 4 in)
- Beam: 11.99 m (39 ft 4 in)
- Draft: 5.11 m (16 ft 9 in)
- Speed: 16 kn (30 km/h; 18 mph)
- Capacity: 320 tons of coal
- Complement: 270 officers and men
- Armament: 2 × 210 mm (8.3 in) guns; 2 × 150 mm (5.9 in) guns; 4 × 457 mm (18.0 in) torpedo tubes; 8 × machine guns
- Armour: Belt: 24 cm (9.4 in); Deck: 2.5 to 3 in (64 to 76 mm); Turret: 20 cm (7.9 in)

Jingyuan (Chinese: 經遠; pinyin: Jīngyuǎn; Wade–Giles: Ching-Yuen or King-Yuen) was an armored cruiser in the late Qing Dynasty Beiyang Fleet. Her sister ship was Laiyuan.

== Background ==
As part of his drive to create a modern navy following the Sino-French War, Viceroy Li Hongzhang turned to Vulcan shipyards in Stettin, Germany. Jingyuan and Laiyuan were called "gunboats" by their designers, but were referred to as "cruisers" by the Chinese. In terms of displacement, they were similar in class to the Japanese Matsushima class. However, in terms of weaponry, they mounted large calibre guns in the manner of a coastal defense monitor, and lacked the speed or a higher muzzle velocity main battery typical of ships designed per the tenets of the then-popular Jeune Ecole theory promoted by French naval architect Emile Bertin.

== Design ==
Jingyuan had a steel housing, divided into 66 waterproof compartments filled with cork, two smokestacks, and single mast. Her belt armor had a thickness of 5.5 to 9.5 inches (140 to 240 mm), but did not extend above the waterline or to the extremities of the hull, and was 8 inches (200 mm) at the conning tower and barbettes. Her deck armor had a thickness of 2.5 to 3 inches (64 to 76 mm) at the extremities. The prow was reinforced for ramming. The power plant was a double expansion reciprocating steam engine with four cylindrical boilers, driving two screws.

The ship's main armament was two breech-loading 8.2-inch (209-mm) Krupp cannon, paired in the forward barbette. Provision was made for only 50 rounds of ammunition per gun. The secondary armament consisted of two 6-inch (152 mm) Krupp guns mounted on sponsons on either side of the deck. The ship also had two 47-mm long guns and five 37 mm Hotchkiss guns, as well as two torpedo tubes.

Jingyuan and Laiyuan were second in displacement after the Beiyang Fleet battleships Dingyuan and Zhenyuan, but were deficient in speed and firepower compared with contemporary vessels such as the British-built Elswick cruisers. Although its armor belt gave Jingyuan an advantage over non-protected vessels, its two-inch lacquered teak deck made it flammable in the event of a battle.

== Service record ==
Jingyuan was laid down on 1 January 1885, launched on 25 March 1887, and completed on 1 January 1888.

On arrival in China in 1888, Jingyuan and Laiyuan were both assigned to the Beiyang Fleet. In the summer of 1889, both vessels were part of the flotilla let by Admiral Ding Ruchang, calling on the Russian naval base of Vladivostok. In early 1894, both vessels accompanied Dingyuan and Zhenyuan on a visit to Singapore, but the flotilla was recalled to Weihaiwei on the eve of the First Sino-Japanese War with the Empire of Japan.

Jingyuan and Laiyuan were both in the Battle of the Yalu River on 17 September 1894. Early in the battle, the captain of Laiyuan moved aggressively against the Japanese squadron, pursuing and severely damaging the slower moving Japanese gunboat Akagi, but receiving considerable damage in return, which set her on fire and removed her from the combat. With Laiyuan apparently doomed, the Japanese flying squadron led by Admiral Tsuboi Kozo (Yoshino, Takachiho, Akitsushima, and Naniwa), concentrated fire on Jingyuan for over an hour. Briefly, Jingyuan appeared to be closing on Yoshino in an apparent attempt to ram, but at 16:48, lurched to the starboard and burst into flames. Soon after, with a large explosion, Jingyuan rolled over and sank. Of the 270 crewmen, only seven escaped.
