= Chinese cruiser Laiyuan =

Coordinates: 37.497°N 122.171°E

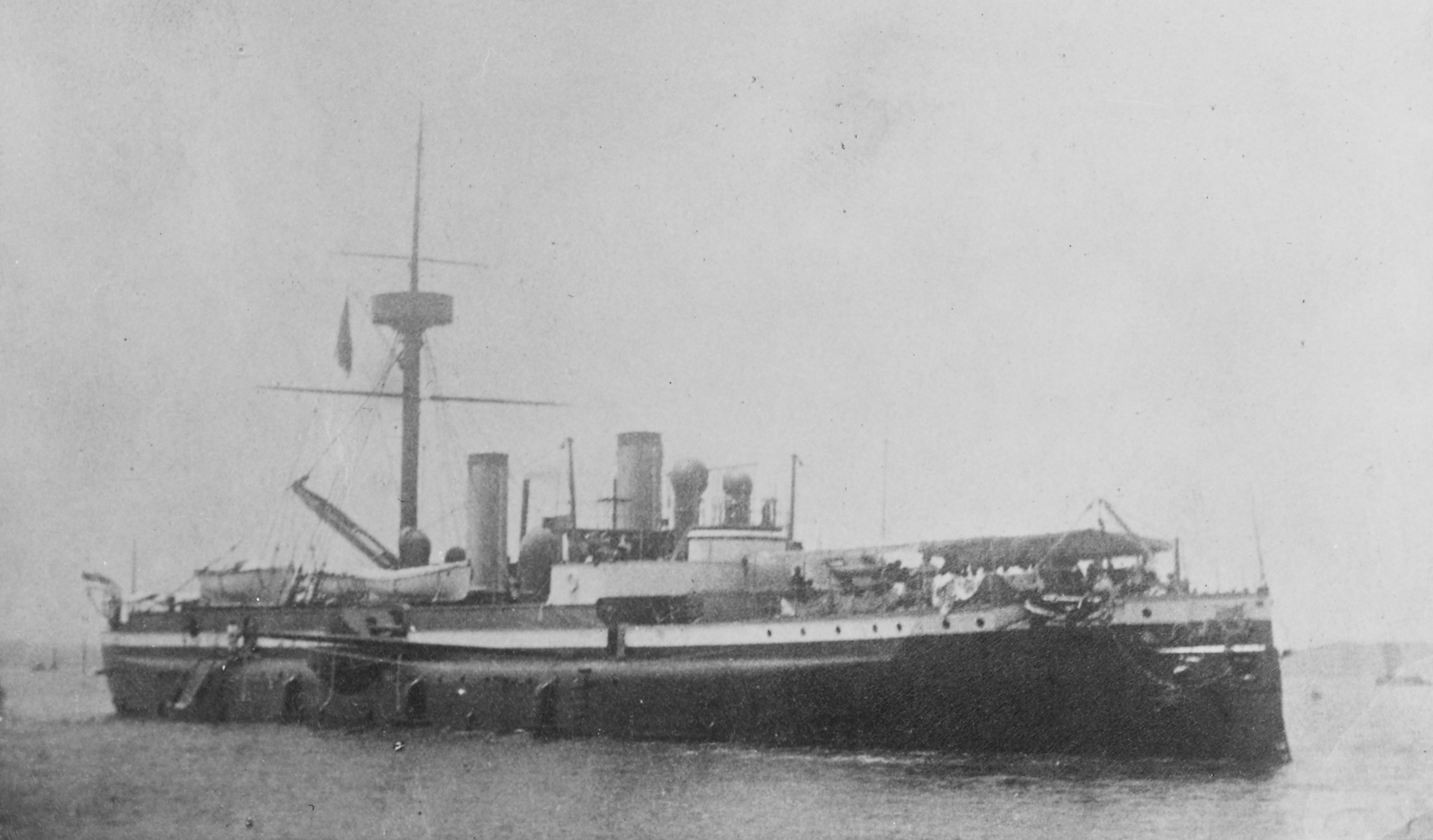
- Lai Yuen

History

Imperial China
- Name: Laiyuen
- Builder: Stettiner AG Vulcan,
- Cost: 865,000 silver tael
- Laid down: 1 January 1885
- Launched: 25 March 1887
- Completed: 1 January 1888
- Fate: Sunk in combat; 5 February 1895

General characteristics
- Type: Armored cruiser
- Displacement: 2,900 t (2,900 long tons)
- Length: 82.4 m (270 ft 4 in)
- Beam: 11.99 m (39 ft 4 in)
- Draft: 5.11 m (16 ft 9 in)
- Speed: 16 kn (30 km/h; 18 mph)
- Capacity: 320 tons of coal
- Complement: 270 officers and men
- Armament: 2 × 210 mm (8.3 in) guns; 2 × 15 cm MRK L/35 (6 inch) guns; 4 × 457 mm (18.0 in) torpedo tubes; 8 × machine guns
- Armour: Belt: 24 cm (9.4 in); Turret: 20 cm (7.9 in)

Laiyuan (Chinese: 來遠; pinyin: Laiyuan; Wade–Giles: Lai Yüan), also known as Lai Yuen, was an armored cruiser in the late Qing dynasty Beiyang Fleet. Its sister ship was Jingyuan.

== Background ==
As part of his drive to create a modern navy following the Sino-French War, Viceroy Li Hongzhang turned to Vulcan shipyards in Stettin, Germany. Jingyuan and Laiyuan were called “gunboats” by their designers, but were referred to as “cruisers” by the Chinese. In terms of displacement were similar in class to the Japanese Matsushima class. However, in terms of weaponry, they mounted large calibre guns in the manner of a coastal defense monitor, and lacked the speed or a higher muzzle velocity main battery typical of ships designed per the tenets of the then-popular Jeune Ecole theory promoted by French naval architect Emile Bertin.

== Design ==
Laiyuan had a steel housing, divided into 66 waterproof compartments filled with cork, a single smokestack, and single mast. Her belt armor had a thickness of 5.5 to 9.5 inches (140 to 240 mm) but did not extend above the waterline or to the extremities of the hull, and was 8 inches (200 mm) at the conning tower and barbettes. Her deck armor had a thickness of 2.5 to 3 inches (64 to 76 mm) at the extremities. The prow was reinforced for ramming. The power plant was a double expansion reciprocating steam engine with four cylindrical boilers, driving two screws.

The ship's main armament was two breech-loading 8-inch (209 mm) Krupp cannon, paired in the forward barbette. Provision was made for only 50 rounds of ammunition per gun. The secondary armament consisted of two 15 cm MRK L/35 (6 inch) Krupp guns mounted on sponsons on either side of the deck. The ship also had two 47-mm long guns and five 37 mm Hotchkiss guns, as well as two torpedo tubes.

Jingyuan and Laiyuan were second in displacement after the Beiyang Fleet battleships Dingyuan and Zhenyuan, but were deficient in speed and in firepower, where compared with contemporary vessels, such as the British-built Elswick cruisers. Although its armor belt gave Laiyuan an advantage over non-protected vessels, its two-inch lacquered teak deck made it flammable in the event of a battle.

== Service record ==
Laiyuan was laid down on 1 January 1885, launched on 3 January 1887, completed on 1 January 1888. On arrival in China in 1880, Jingyuan and Laiyuan were both assigned to the Beiyang Fleet. In the summer of 1889, both vessels were part of the flotilla let by Admiral Ding Ruchang, calling on the Russian naval base of Vladivostok. In early 1894, both vessels accompanied Dingyuan and Zhenyuan on a visit to Singapore, but the flotilla was recalled to Weihaiwei on the eve of the First Sino-Japanese War with the Empire of Japan.

Jingyuan and Laiyuan were both in the Battle of the Yalu River on 17 September 1894. Early in the battle, the captain of Laiyuan moved aggressively against the Japanese squadron, pursuing the slower moving Japanese gunboat Akagi. Laiyuan was four times the size of the Japanese gunboat, and her guns killed the Japanese commander and ten crewmen, brought down the gunboat's mast, destroyed the bridge and holed Akagi in eight locations. On the other hand, the quick-firing 120-mm guns of the Akagi wreaked havoc on the Laiyuan, causing a large fire, and forcing her to break off the pursuit. The fire continued to burn through the remainder of the battle, despite the efforts of the crew to extinguish it, including flooding the powder magazine. Coming under attack by the Japanese flying squadron led by Admiral Tsuboi Kozo (Yoshino, Takachiho, Akitsushima, and Naniwa), Laiyuan took many more hits, but refused to sink and continued to burn almost down to her waterline. At the end of the battle, her engines still operational, Laiyuan escaped to the Beiyang Navy repair base at Lushunkou, under her own power.

Repairs were not completed by the time of the Battle of Lushunkou, when the remnants of the Beiyang Fleet were ordered to retreat to Weihaiwei without giving battle. During the subsequent Battle of Weihaiwei, on 5 February 1895, Laiyuan was attacked by two Japanese torpedo boats. Laiyuan was struck by a torpedo fired by Kotaka, rolled over, and capsized, with a loss of approximately 170 crewmen.
