= Naniwa-class cruiser =

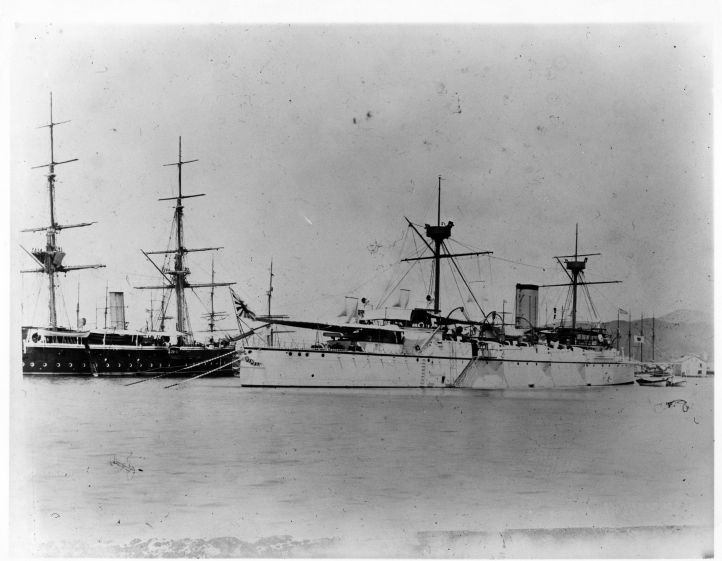
- A Naniwa-class cruiser (right) in Honolulu Harbor, 1893–1894

Class overview
- Name: Naniwa class
- Builders: Armstrong Mitchell, United Kingdom
- Operators: Imperial Japanese Navy
- Preceded by: Izumi
- Succeeded by: Unebi
- Built: 1884–1885
- In commission: 1886–1914
- Completed: 2
- Lost: 2

General characteristics (as built)
- Type: Protected cruiser
- Displacement: 3,727 long tons (3,787 t)
- Length: 320 ft (97.5 m) (o/a)
- Beam: 46 ft (14 m)
- Draught: 20 ft 3 in (6.2 m) (full load)
- Installed power: 6 cylindrical boilers; 7,500 ihp (5,593 kW)
- Propulsion: 2 shafts; 2 compound-expansion steam engines
- Speed: 18 knots (33 km/h; 21 mph)
- Range: 9,000 nmi (17,000 km; 10,000 mi) at 13 knots (24 km/h; 15 mph)
- Complement: 338–342
- Armament: 2 × single 26 cm (10.2 in) guns; 6 × single 15 cm (5.9 in) guns; 2 × single 6 pdr (57 mm (2.2 in)) guns; 10 × quadruple 1 in (25 mm) guns; 4 × 10-barrel 11 mm (0.43 in) guns; 4 × 14 in (356 mm) torpedo tubes
- Armour: Deck: 2–3 in (51–76 mm); Gun shields: 2 in (51 mm); Conning tower: 3 in (76 mm)

The two Naniwa-class cruisers (浪速型防護巡洋艦, Naniwa-gata bōgojun'yōkan) were protected cruisers built for the Imperial Japanese Navy (IJN) during the 1880s. As Japan lacked the industrial capacity to build such warships herself, the vessels were built in Britain. Both ships participated in numerous actions during the First Sino-Japanese War of 1894–1895 and in the Russo-Japanese War of 1904–1905.

== Background ==
The 1876 Treaty of Gangwha forcibly opened up Joseon Korea to the Japanese, much like the Americans forced the Japanese Tokugawa Shogunate to sign the Convention of Kanagawa in 1854, and Joseon formally withdrew from its status as a tributary of Qing China. The Chinese made no significant response at that time and King Gojong began a modest effort to modernize the country to allow it to better withstand foreign pressure. This upset conservative elements in the army and the population which led to the Imo Incident of 1882 where the rioters attacked the Japanese Legation, forcing the diplomats to take refuge aboard a British ship and in the royal palace. The Chinese sent troops that crushed the rebellion and they reasserted control over Joseon, reducing it to a vassal state, rather than resuming its previous pro-forma tributary status.

Concerned about the rising power of Imperial Russia and Japan, Li Hongzhang, Viceroy of Zhili Province, and generally responsible for relations with Russia, Korea and Japan had begun a program of gradually expanding the Beiyang Fleet after the 1874 Japanese reprisal expedition to Taiwan. An 1880 order for two Dingyuan-class ironclads from the German Empire capped the program as neither the Imperial Russian Navy nor the IJN could match them once they were delivered.

In response the Japanese Navy Ministry submitted a budget for the Fourth Naval Expansion Program in 1881, but it was rejected as too expensive. The Ministry then attempted to purchase existing warships from European shipyards after the Imo Incident, but was only able to buy the unprotected cruiser Tsukushi from Chile because its delivery had been embargoed by the builder because of the ongoing War of the Pacific between Chile, Bolivia and Peru. It then proposed the Fifth Naval Expansion Program that was approved in early 1883 after negotiations to reduce its expense. This included funds for one ironclad and a protected cruiser, but the designs for the former proved to be too expensive and the IJN decided to follow the recommendation of Armstrong Mitchell's chief naval architect, William White, to build two improved versions of the pioneering Chilean protected cruiser Esmeralda (later purchased by the IJN and renamed Izumi).

The "Elswick"-type protected cruisers, of which Esmeralda was the first example, had been designed by White's predecessor, George Rendel, for Armstrong Mitchell as a private venture. It was of great interest to Japan because of her high speed, powerful armament, armor protection and relatively low cost, especially since the IJN lacked the resources at the time to purchase ironclads.

Pioneering Japanese naval architect Sasō Sachū requested that Armstrong Whitworth make modifications to the Esmeralda design to customize it for Japanese requirements, and two vessels, Naniwa and Takachiho were ordered under the 1883 fiscal year budget, by Naval Minister Kawamura Sumiyoshi. When completed, Naniwa was considered the most advanced and most powerful cruiser in the world. However, the extremely fast development of technology, weaponry and armor in this field of ship design meant that the supremacy of this design was very short.

The two cruisers together cost £546,980. Prince Yamashina Kikumaro attended the launch, and afterwards had dinner with Baron William Armstrong, who made a toast that "the ship was destined to the service of a country which was likely never to come into collision with our own peace-loving country".

== Design and description ==
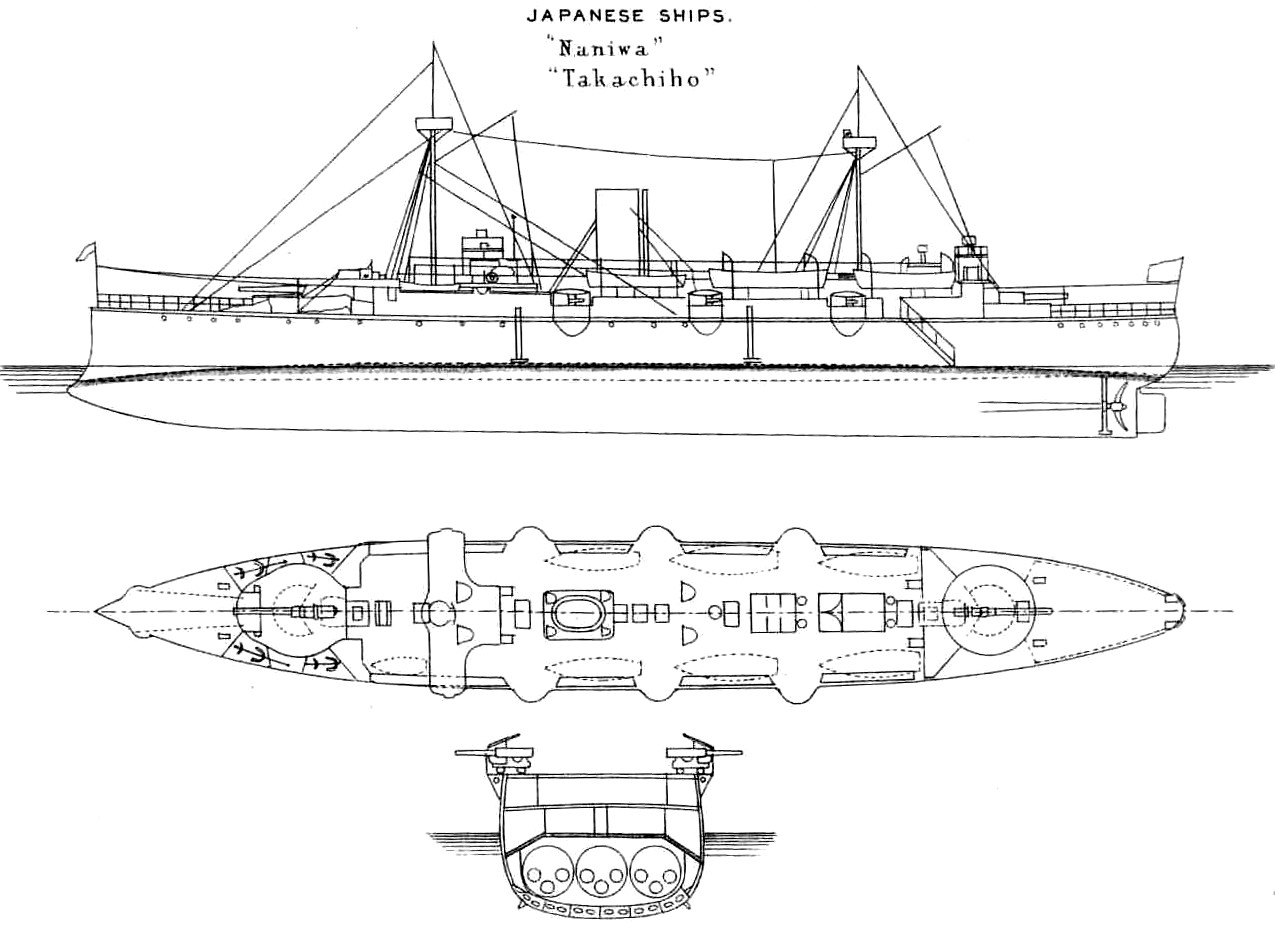
Plan and right elevation line drawings as shown in Brassey's Naval Annual 1888

The Naniwa-class ships displaced 3,727 long tons (3,787 t) at normal load. They had a length between perpendiculars of 300 feet (91.4 m) and an overall length of 320 feet (97.5 m), a beam of 46 feet (14 m) and a draft of 20 feet 3 inches (6.2 m) at deep load. They were fitted with a plough-shaped naval ram of mild steel below the waterline and had a partial double bottom extending between the forward and aft magazines.

The ships were powered by a pair of horizontal, two-cylinder, double-expansion steam engines, each driving a single three-bladed 14-foot (4.27 m) propeller using steam produced by six cylindrical boilers that operated at a pressure of 6.3 atm (638 kPa; 93 psi). The engines were designed to produce a total of 7,500 indicated horsepower (5,600 kW) with forced draught to give the ships a maximum speed of 18 knots (33 km/h; 21 mph). During their speed trials, the cruisers reached speeds of 18.72–18.77 knots (34.67–34.76 km/h; 21.54–21.60 mph) from 7,235–7,604 ihp (5,395–5,670 kW). They carried a maximum of 800 long tons (810 t) of coal which gave them a range of about 9,000 nautical miles (17,000 km; 10,000 mi) at a speed of 13 knots (24 km/h; 15 mph). The ships' crew consisted of 338–342 officers and ratings.

As built, the main battery of the Naniwa-class cruisers consisted of two 35-caliber 260 mm (10.2 in) Elswick Ordnance Company cannon of 28 ton in barbettes fore and aft of the superstructure. Each barbette was fitted with a fixed loading station in its rear and the guns had to return to this position to reload. Two hundred rounds per gun were stored.

The secondary armament was initially six 35-caliber 150 mm (5.9 in) Krupp cannon mounted in semi-circular sponsons on the main deck, with 450 rounds per gun. All of these guns were protected against the weather by gun shields. Defense against torpedo boats was provided by two QF 6 pounder Hotchkiss guns, ten 1-inch Nordenfelt guns and four 11-mm, 10-barrel Nordenfelt guns. In addition, there were four 356 mm (14 in) Whitehead torpedo tubes mounted on the main deck. After the First Sino-Japanese War, both Naniwa and Takachiho were re-armed with eight Elswick QF 6 inch /40 naval guns in order to increase stability and standardize on ammunition for the fleet.

== Ships in class ==
Two Naniwa-class cruisers were purchased from Armstrong Whitworth in England. Naniwa was lost before the start of World War I, Takachiho was lost soon after hostilities commenced.

Naniwa

Ordered in 1883, launched 18 March 1885, and completed 1 December 1885, Naniwa played a major role in the First Sino-Japanese War, notably at the Battle of Pungdo and the Battle of the Yalu River. During the Russo-Japanese War she was present at the opening Battle of Chemulpo Bay, but was subsequently assigned a reserve role. After the war, she was lost after running aground on 26 July 1910 on the coast of Urup, in the Kurile Islands .

Takachiho

Ordered in 1883, launched 16 May 1885, and completed 1 December 1885, Takachiho participated in the Battle of the Yalu River in the First Sino-Japanese War. In the Russo-Japanese War she was present at the opening Battle of Chemulpo Bay, but was subsequently assigned a reserve role. In World War I, while covering the invasion of German-held Qingdao, she was torpedoed by the German torpedo boat S90 on 14 October 1914 and sank with the loss of 271 officers and men.
