= Chinese ironclad Zhenyuan =

Chinese Dingyuan-class ironclad battleship

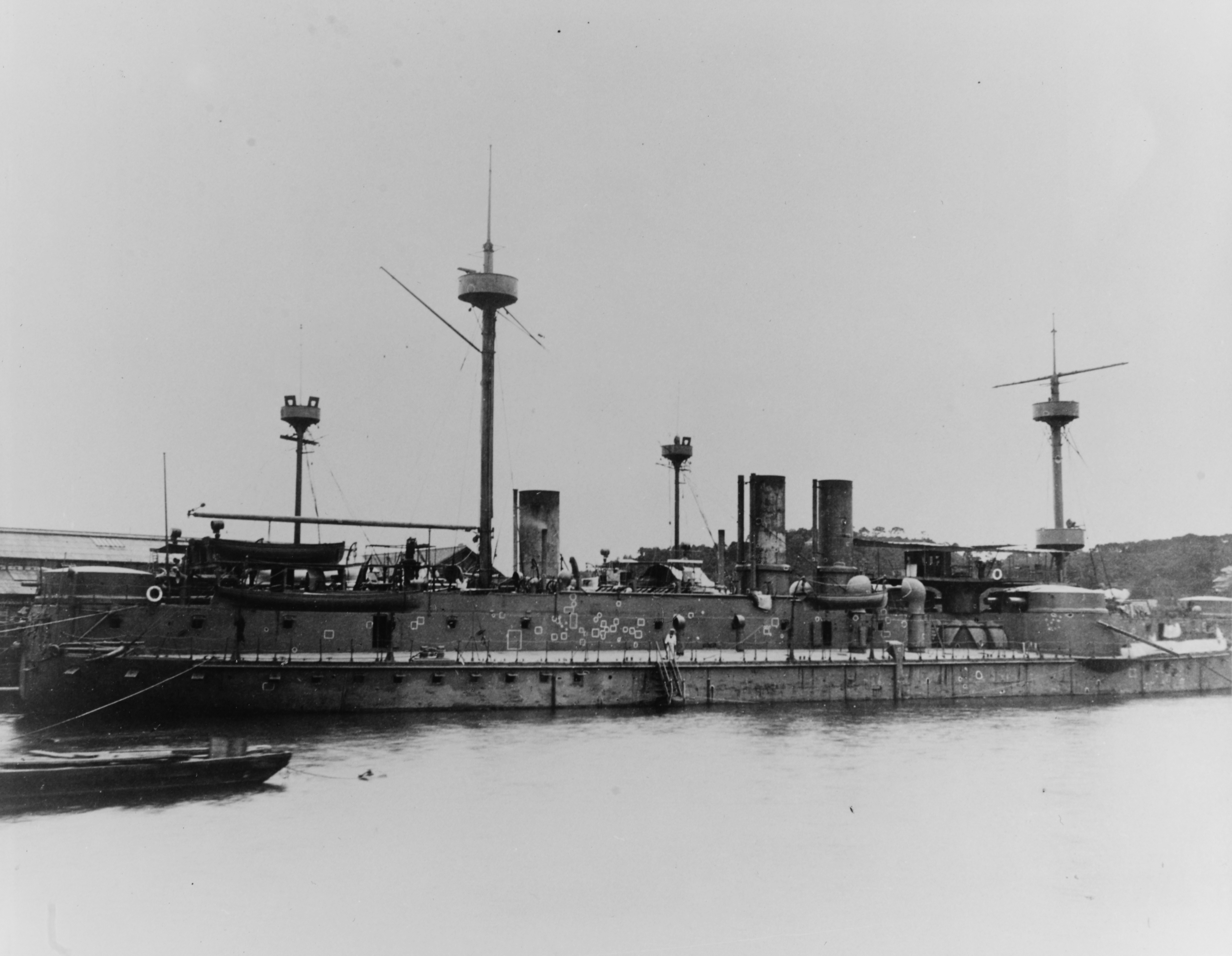
- Zhenyuan, following capture by the Imperial Japanese Navy at Weihaiwei

History

China
- Name: Zhenyuan
- Namesake: "Striking from afar"
- Ordered: 1881
- Builder: AG Vulcan, Stettin
- Laid down: March 1882
- Launched: 28 November 1882
- Completed: April 1884
- Commissioned: November 1885
- Fate: Seized as a war prize, 17 February 1895

Japan
- Acquired: 17 February 1895
- Commissioned: 16 March 1895
- Decommissioned: April 1911
- Renamed: Chin Yen
- Fate: Broken up, 1912

General characteristics
- Class & type: Dingyuan-class ironclad
- Displacement: Normal: 7,220 long tons (7,340 t); Full load: 7,670 long tons (7,790 t)
- Length: 308 ft (94 m)
- Beam: 59 ft (18 m)
- Draft: 20 ft (6.1 m)
- Installed power: 8 fire-tube boilers; 7,200 ihp (5,400 kW)
- Propulsion: 2 compound steam engines; 2 × screw propellers
- Speed: 15.4 knots (28.5 km/h; 17.7 mph)
- Range: 4,500 nmi (8,300 km; 5,200 mi) at 10 knots (19 km/h; 12 mph)
- Complement: 350
- Armament: 4 × 12 in (305 mm) breech-loading guns; 2 × 5.9 in (150 mm) breech-loading guns; 2 × 47 mm (1.9 in) Hotchkiss revolver cannon; 6 × 37 mm (1.5 in) Maxim-Nordenfelt quick-firing guns; 3 × 14 in (356 mm) torpedo tubes
- Armor: Belt: 14 in; Deck: 3 in (76 mm); Barbettes: 12–14 in; Conning tower: 8 in (203 mm)

General characteristics In Japanese service
- Installed power: 6,200 ihp (4,600 kW)
- Speed: 14.5 kn (26.9 km/h; 16.7 mph)
- Complement: 250
- Armament: 4 × 305 mm (12 in) L/25 breech-loading guns; 6 × 152 mm (6 in) QF guns; 2 × 57 mm (2.2 in) Hotchkiss guns; 8 × 47 mm (1.9 in) Hotchkiss revolver cannon

Zhenyuan (Chinese: 鎮遠; pinyin: Zhènyuǎn; Wade–Giles: Chen Yuen) was an ironclad battleship built for the Chinese Beiyang Fleet. She was the second and final member of the Dingyuan class, which included one other vessel, Dingyuan, both of which were built in Germany in the early 1880s. Delivery of the two ironclads was delayed by the Sino-French War of 1884–1885. The ships were armed with a main battery of four 12 in (305 mm) guns in a pair of gun turrets, making them the most powerful warships in East Asian waters at the time.

In the 1880s and early 1890s, the Beiyang Fleet conducted a routine of training exercises and cruises abroad, with emphasis placed on visits to Japan to intimidate the country. The latter resulted in the Nagasaki Incident in 1886 and contributed to a rise in hostility between the two countries that culminated in the First Sino-Japanese War in 1894. She saw action at the Battle of the Yalu River on 17 September, where the Japanese Combined Fleet sank much of the Beiyang Fleet, though both Zhenyuan and Dingyuan survived despite numerous hits. The survivors then retreated to Port Arthur for repairs, but after that city was threatened by the Japanese army, fled to Weihaiwei. While entering the port, Zhenyuan struck an uncharted rock and was badly damaged; she was used as a stationary artillery battery during the Battle of Weihaiwei in February 1895, but Japanese forces captured the city's fortifications, which forced the Chinese to surrender the fleet.

Zhenyuan was seized as a war prize, repaired, and commissioned into the Imperial Japanese Navy as Chin Yen. She frequently toured Japan in the late 1890s and early 1900s to celebrate Japan's victory over China. Obsolescent by the time of the Russo-Japanese War, she nevertheless saw action at the Battle of the Yellow Sea in August 1904 and the Battle of Tsushima in May 1905. She also supported the invasion of Sakhalin in July 1905. After the war, Chin Yen became a training ship, serving in that role until 1911, thereafter being sold to ship breakers in 1912.

== Design ==
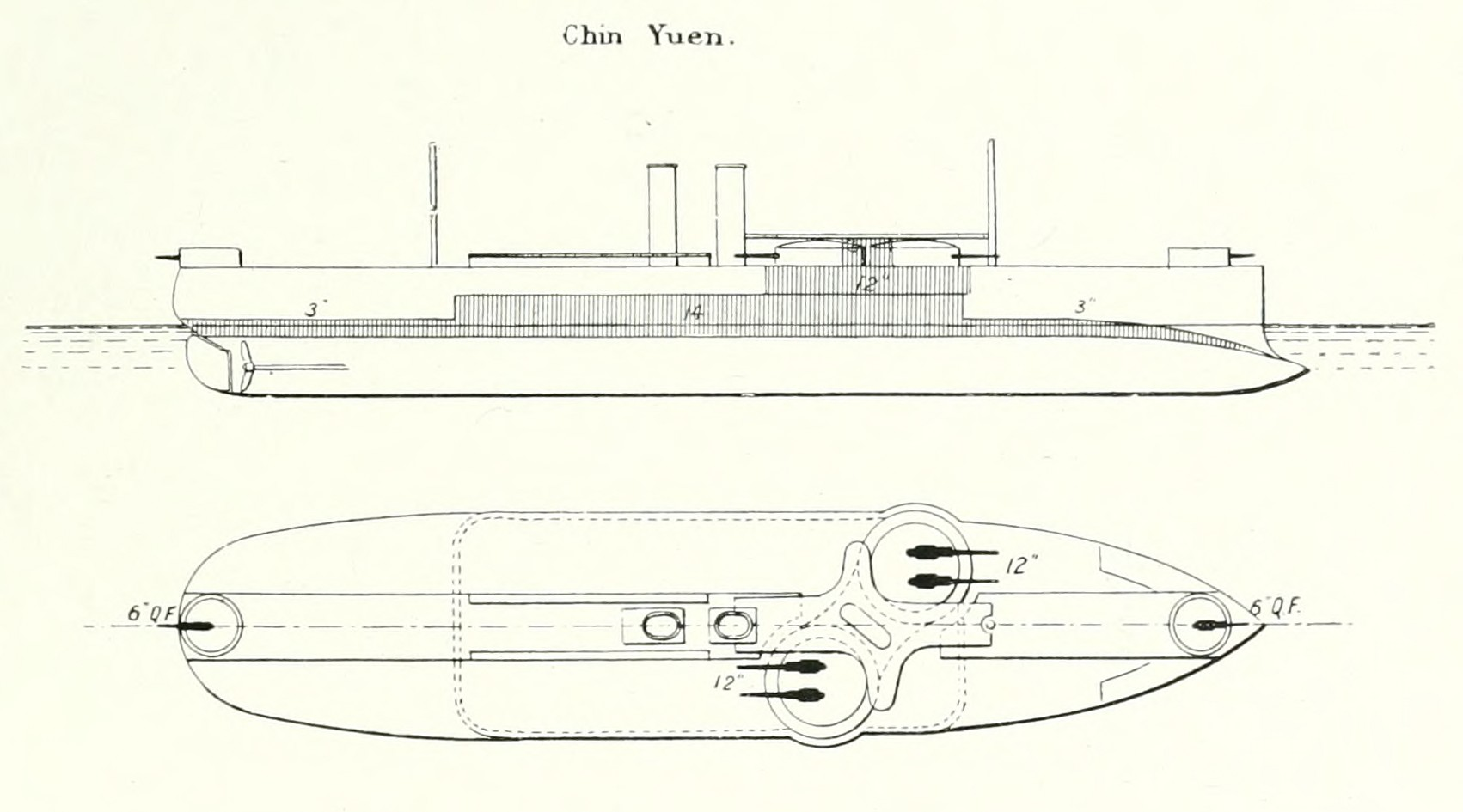
An overview of the layout of a Dingyuan-class ironclad

Following the direct intervention of the imperialist European powers in the mid-19th century, including the First and Second Opium Wars, where their superior steam-powered fleets overwhelmed the small Imperial Chinese Navy that still relied on traditional junks, the Chinese began a naval construction program in the 1880s to meet these threats more effectively. They enlisted British and German assistance, and two Dingyuan-class ironclads were ordered from Germany.

Zhenyuan was 308 ft (94 m) long overall, with a beam of 59 ft (18 m) and a draft of 20 ft (6.1 m). She displaced 7,220 long tons (7,340 t) normally and up to 7,670 long tons (7,790 t) at full load. She was powered by a pair of compound steam engines that each drove a screw propeller. Steam was provided by eight coal-fired fire-tube boilers that were ducted into a pair of funnels amidships. She was capable of a top speed of 15.7 knots (29.1 km/h; 18.1 mph) from 7,500 indicated horsepower (5,600 kW). Her crew consisted of 350 officers and enlisted men.

The ship carried a main battery of four 12 in (305 mm) 25-caliber breech-loading guns in two twin-gun turrets that were placed en echelon forward. These were supported by a secondary battery of two 15 cm MRK L/35 guns in a pair of single turrets, one at the bow and the other at the stern. For defense against torpedo boats, she carried a pair of 3-pounder, 47 mm (1.9 in) Hotchkiss revolver cannon and eight 37 mm (1.5 in) Maxim-Nordenfelt quick-firing guns in casemates. She was also equipped with three 14 in (356 mm) or 15 in (381 mm) torpedo tubes.

She was protected by compound armor that was 14 in for the armor belt, which covered the central part of the ship were the ammunition magazines and propulsion machinery spaces were located. An armor deck that was 3 in (76 mm) thick provided horizontal protection. Her conning tower was covered with 8 in (203 mm) of armor plate on the sides. The barbettes for the gun turrets were 12–14 in thick. A strake of armor that was 8 in thick protected the casemate guns.

=== Modifications ===
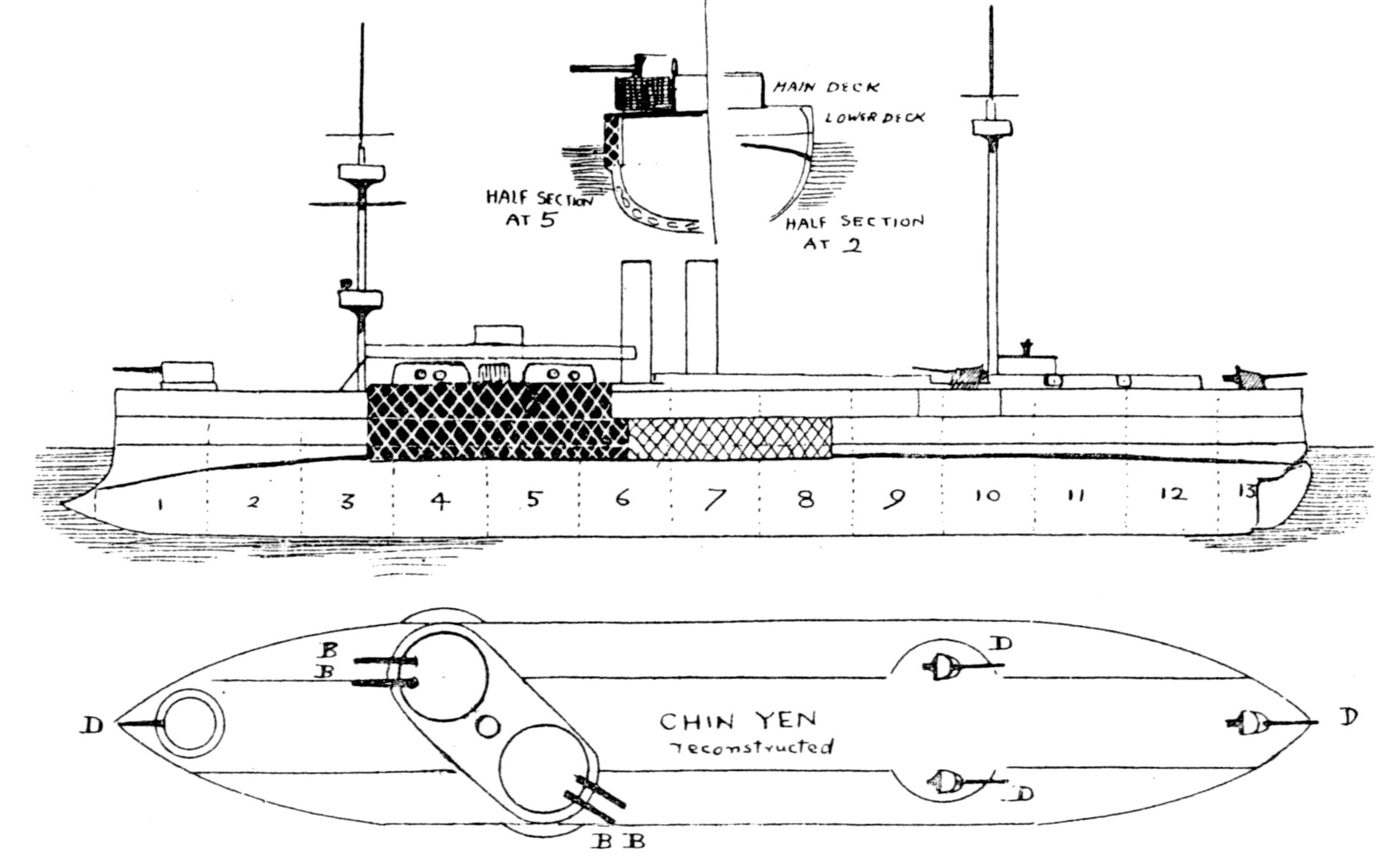
Chin Yen as reconstructed

Upon her acquisition by Japan in 1895, the ship was significantly modernized, including new fire-control directors for the main battery and more powerful secondary and tertiary batteries. The Japanese had initially considered replacing the main battery guns, but the project proved to be beyond the capabilities of Japanese shipyards at the time.

The old, slow-firing 5.9 in guns were replaced with 6 in (152 mm) quick-firing guns; the forward turret was retained, but the stern mount was replaced with an open mount with a gun shield. Two more of the guns were installed abreast of the main mast, both in the same shielded mount as the stern gun. The Dingyuan-class ships suffered from trim problems as a result of their heavy main battery turrets being placed forward, which caused them to nose down and ship water; it also hampered their steering ability. The addition of the 6-inch guns further aft helped to counterbalance the weight of the main battery, significantly improving both defects. The light battery was revised to a pair of 6-pounder Hotchkiss guns and eight of the Hotchkiss 3-pounders, all in individual mounts.

Displacement and other dimensions remained the same, but by that time, the propulsion system was only capable of producing 6,200 ihp (4,600 kW) for a speed of 14.5 knots (26.9 km/h; 16.7 mph). Her crew was reduced significantly, despite the addition of the 6-inch guns, to 250 officers and enlisted men.

== Service history ==
=== Chinese service ===
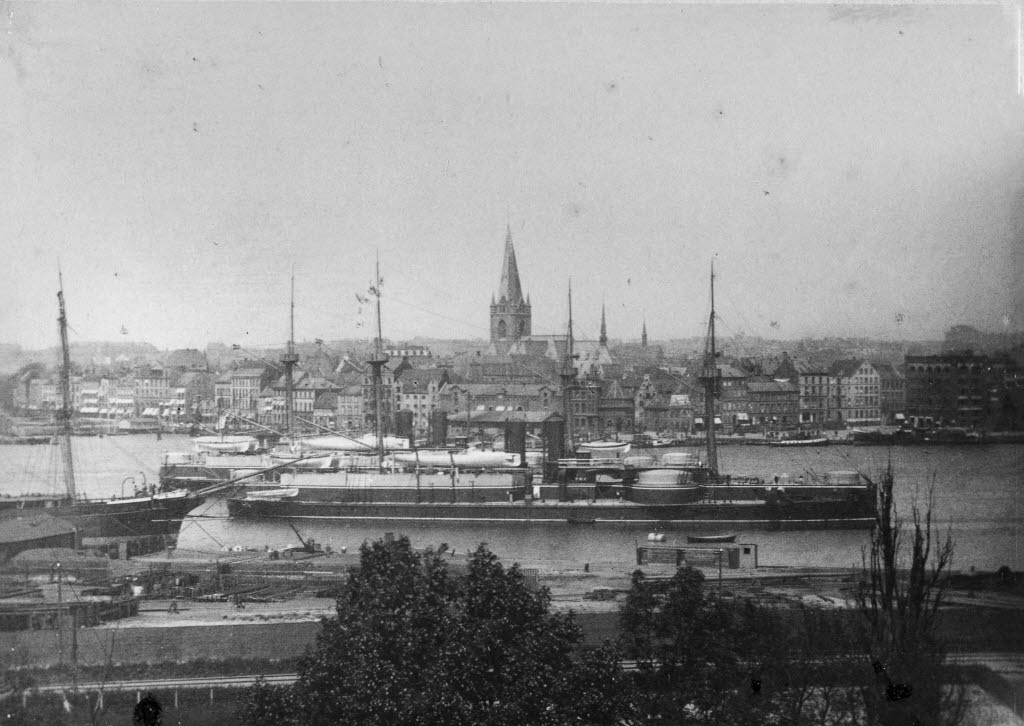
Zhenyuan and Dingyuan in Germany before departing for China

Zhenyuan was ordered in 1881 and was laid down at the AG Vulcan shipyard in Stettin, Germany in March 1882; her name means "striking from afar" in Chinese. Work proceeded quickly and she was launched on 28 November 1882, though fitting-out work continued into early 1884. She was completed in April that year, but the outbreak of the Sino-French War in August prevented both Dingyuan-class ships from being delivered until 1885. Both vessels were manned by German crews, sailing on 3 July 1885 under the German flag in company with the also German-built protected cruiser Jiyuan. The three ships arrived in Tianjin in November, where they were transferred to Chinese control. Li Hongzhang, the Viceroy of Zhili and director of China's naval construction program, inspected the vessels following their arrival. The two ironclads were then commissioned into the Beiyang Fleet, which was based in Port Arthur. The ships steamed south to Shanghai for the winter of 1885–1886.

In the 1880s, the Beiyang Fleet was occupied with an annual routine of winter training cruises to the South China Sea, often in company with the Nanyang Fleet. This cruise typically involved visits to Zhejiang, Fujian, and Guangdong provinces, and sometimes went as far south as stops in Southeast Asia. The rest of the year was spent in northern waters off Zhili, Shandong, and Fengtian provinces, conducting training exercises. Training cruises to foreign ports were conducted in the mid-1880s and early 1890s, both to train navigational skills on voyages far from shore and to show the flag. Discipline aboard the ships of the Beiyang Fleet was poor, which contributed to a low state of readiness of the ships. During this period, the fleet was commanded by Admiral Ding Ruchang, while Zhenyuan was captained by Lin Taizeng, who was promoted to the rank of rear admiral shortly after taking command in 1885. Lin served as Ding's deputy through 1894. At the time, China lacked dry docks large enough to handle Zhenyuan and Dingyuan, forcing the navy to rely on shipyards in Japan or in British Hong Kong for periodic maintenance.

The two Dingyuan-class ships began their training routine in April 1886 in joint maneuvers with the units of the Nanyang Fleet, which culminated in a naval review in Port Arthur. They received the British vessels of the China Station from 19 to 20 May. Zhenyuan, Dingyuan, and four cruisers began the first of their overseas cruises in August 1886, which included stops in Hong Kong, Busan and Wonsan in Korea, Vladivostok, Russia, and Nagasaki, Japan. While at the latter port in August, Chinese crewmen became involved in an altercation with Japanese locals that resulted in the deaths of eight Chinese sailors and two Japanese policemen, with forty-two Chinese and twenty-nine Japanese injured. The so-called Nagasaki Incident was characterized by the Japanese press as an attempt by China to intimidate Japan, leading to calls for naval expansion to counter the Beiyang Fleet. The Japanese government ordered three Matsushima-class protected cruisers in response. The Japanese also refused to allow the Chinese ironclads to return for repairs in their shipyards, hampering the ability of the Beiyang Fleet to keep the vessels operational.

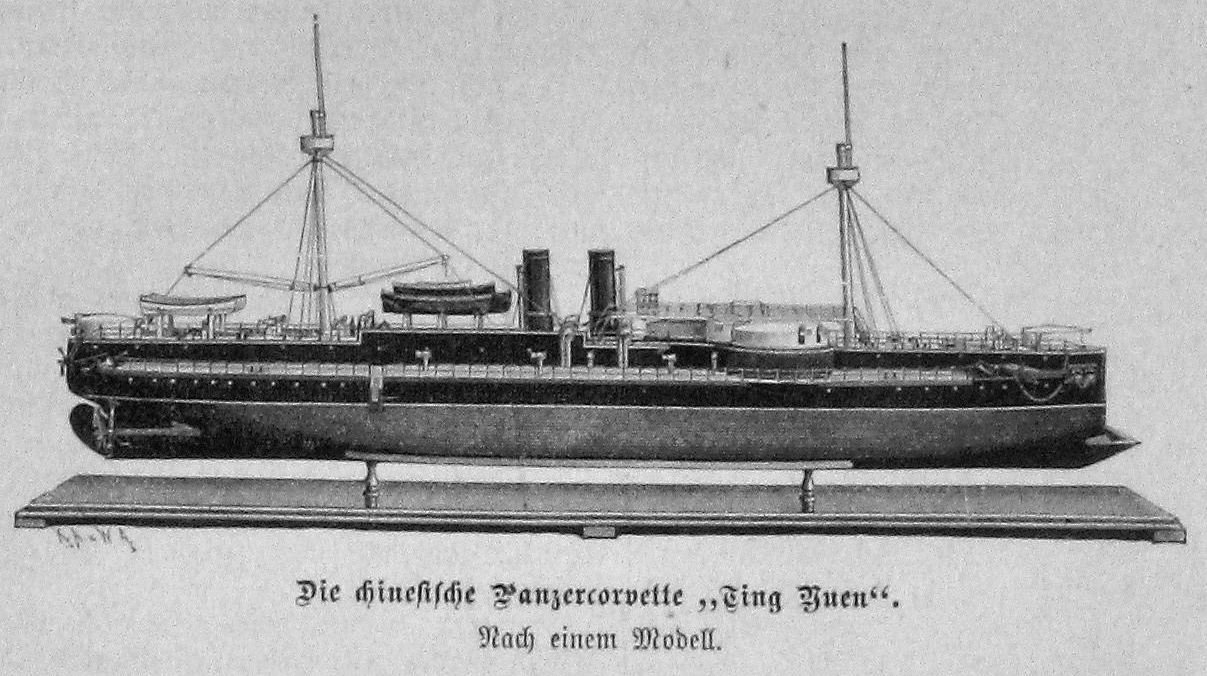
A model of the Dingyuan class depicted in Die Gartenlaube

The year 1887 passed less eventfully, with the ships spending the bulk of the year in the Bohai Sea. Late in the year, another group of four European-built cruisers arrived, further strengthening the fleet and necessitating extensive maneuvers in 1888 to familiarize the crews with the rest of the fleet. The Beiyang Fleet adopted the same black, white, and buff paint scheme used by the Royal Navy at the time, repainting their vessels at some point in 1888. In 1889, the fleet was divided into two divisions; Dingyuan and several cruisers were sent on a tour of Korean ports while Zhenyuan and the rest of the fleet remained in the Bohai Sea for exercises. The two divisions rendezvoused in Shanghai in December, thereafter proceeding to Hong Kong for Zhenyuan and Dingyuan to be drydocked. They then cruised off Korea, where Zhenyuan ran aground in November 1890, forcing another return to Hong Kong for repairs.

Another visit to Japan came in June and July 1891, the first since the Nagasaki Incident; the fleet stopped in Kobe on 30 June and Yokohama on 14 July. At the latter port, a large Japanese delegation of senior military commanders and members of the imperial family received the ships. Another voyage to Japan took place the following year. Coupled with the Nagasaki Incident, these voyages contributed to the growing tensions between China and Japan, since Hongzhang intended them to make clear Chinese naval strength at a time the Japanese fleet was small and poorly developed. At the core of the dispute was control over Korea, which since the Convention of Tientsin of 1884, was treated as a co-protectorate of China and Japan.

==== First Sino-Japanese War ====
In early 1894, the Donghak Peasant Revolution broke out in Korea, prompting China to send an expedition of 28,000 to suppress the rebels. Japan viewed this as a violation of the Tientsin Convention and deployed 8,000 troops in response, leading to the outbreak of the First Sino-Japanese War on 1 August. The Chinese fleet was no match for the new Combined Fleet of Japan, as years of insufficient naval budgets had not allowed Hongzhang to update the vessels—funds he had planned to use to add new quick-firing guns to Zhenyuan and Dingyuan were instead appropriated for the 60th birthday of the Dowager Empress Cixi—and the Chinese lacked effective commanders and sufficiently trained crews. At the time, the American soldier of fortune Philo McGiffen served as the ship's executive officer to advise Lin. And to add to China's disadvantages during the war, the Japanese had broken the Chinese diplomatic codes in 1888, giving them access to China's internal communications.

As the Chinese made preparations in August for action, they removed the gun shields from the main battery turrets. Experience at the Battle of Pungdo had revealed the thin shields created numerous splinters when struck by enemy fire, and these fragments had inflicted numerous casualties to the gun crews of the cruiser Jiyuan at Pungdo. The crews also placed bags of coal around the gun batteries as a form of improvised armor. The ships were repainted light gray to make them more difficult to observe at sea. The ships of the Beiyang Fleet then steamed to Taku to take on supplies, thereafter doing little for the next month.

===== Battle of the Yalu River =====
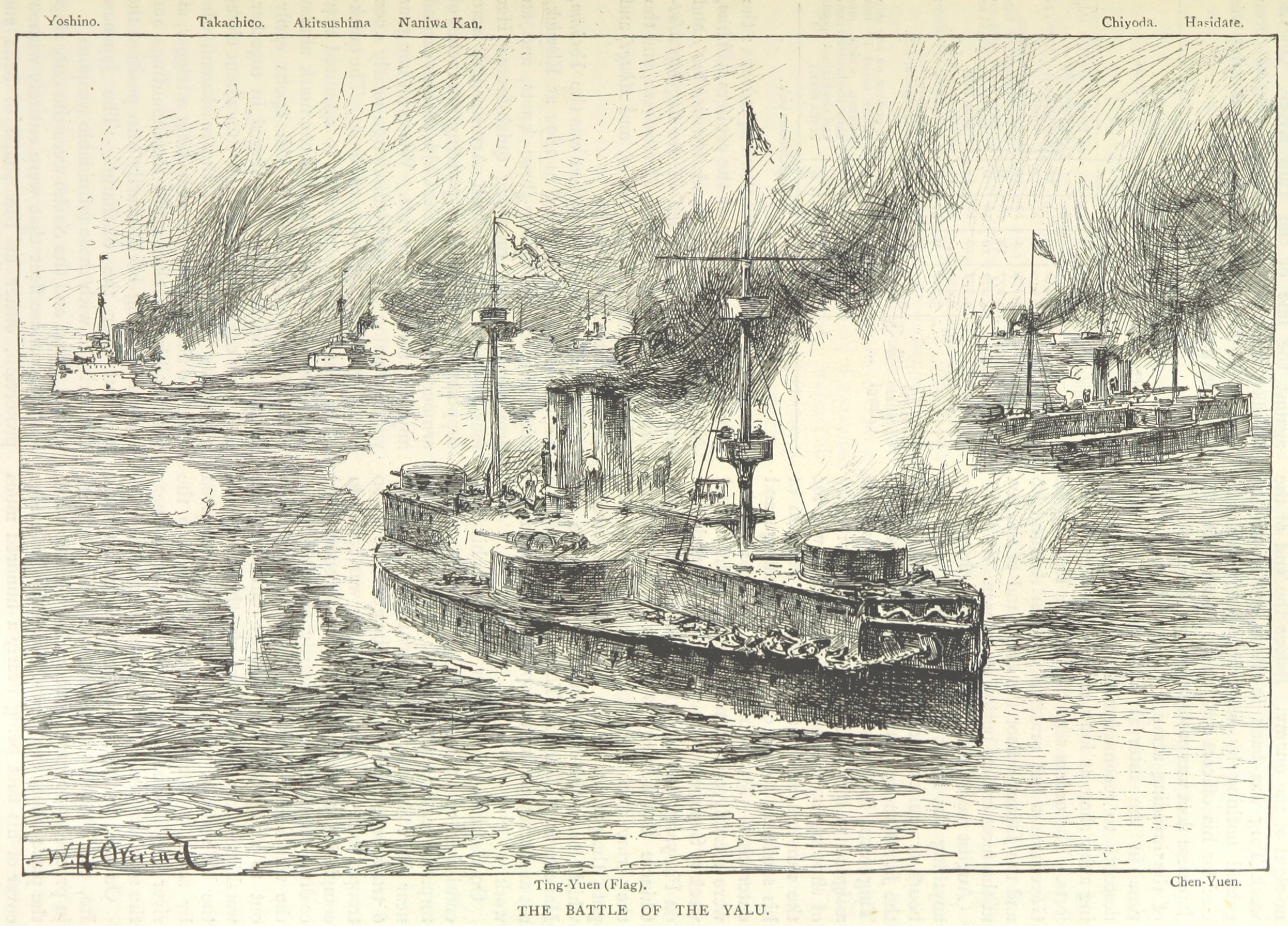
Sketch of Dingyuan (center) and Zhenyuan (right) under fire at the Yalu River

Ding took the fleet on a sweep into the Korea Bay on 12 September to clear the way for a convoy of troopships scheduled to deliver reinforcements to Korea. While on the way to the bay, he received faulty reports indicating the presence of Japanese warships off the Shandong Peninsula, prompting him to change course to search for them. Finding no enemy vessels, he took the fleet to Weihaiwei (modern Weihai), and on 15 September, the fleet rendezvoused with the convoy to cover its approach to the mouth of the Yalu River, where the transports deposited the men and supplies on 16 September. During the unloading process, Zhenyuan and the bulk of the fleet remained underway to provide distant support and avoid presenting themselves as stationary targets to Japanese torpedo boats known to be in the area. While the Chinese were on the way back to Port Arthur, the Combined Fleet under Vice Admiral Itō Sukeyuki intercepted them on 17 September, leading to the Battle of the Yalu River. The poorly trained Beiyang Fleet sailed in a disorganized line abreast formation, while the Japanese approached them from the south in line ahead; the Chinese ships steamed at around 6 knots (11 km/h; 6.9 mph) and the Japanese at 10 knots (19 km/h; 12 mph).

Itō turned his ships to port to pass in front of the oncoming Beiyang Fleet. Dingyuan opened fire first, at about 12:20, at the extreme range of 5,300 yd (4,800 m), far in excess of what fire-control equipment was capable of accurately directing at the time. The blast effect from Dingyuan's initial salvo destroyed her own bridge, collapsing it and trapping Ding and his staff for the duration of the action, depriving the Beiyang Fleet of central control. The rest of the Chinese fleet quickly followed Dingyuan, but failed to score any hits as their opponents passed in front. The Japanese ships returned fire at 12:25, having divided into two squadrons and turned back to starboard to encircle the Chinese. Concentrating their fire on the cruisers on the Chinese right flank, they quickly destroyed the Chinese cruisers Yangwei and Chaoyong. The battle quickly devolved into a melee at close range, and the Chinese cruisers Zhiyuan and Jingyuan were sunk. In return, the Chinese warships inflicted serious damage on the old ironclad Hiei, which had been unable to keep pace with the rest of Itō's fleet, and was eventually forced to disengage and flee. Zhenyuan and Dingyuan hit the auxiliary cruiser Saikyō Maru with four 12-inch shells and inflicted significant damage.

Zhenyuan's heavy citadel armor proved to be impervious to the Japanese shellfire directed against it, though the large-caliber Canet guns mounted on the Matsushima-class cruisers proved to be nearly useless and the other Japanese cruisers were engaged with their Chinese counterparts. At 15:30, Zhenyuan scored a hit with her main battery on the Japanese flagship Matsushima, striking her forward barbette. The shell disabled the forward main gun, set the ship on fire, disabled four of Matsushima's secondary guns, and inflicted heavy casualties. Itō was forced to shift his flag as a result. Zhenyuan caught fire several times during the action, but her crew was able to quickly suppress the fires. By around 17:00, both sides were low on ammunition and the Chinese began to reform their surviving vessels into line-ahead formation. The Japanese eventually broke off at around 17:30 and withdrew. The battered Beiyang Fleet, by then reduced to the two Dingyuan-class ships and four smaller vessels, limped back to Port Arthur, arriving there the next day.

In the course of the action, Zhenyuan had expended all of her 5.9-inch ammunition and most of her 12-inch shells, having just twenty-four solid steel shells remaining. She had taken some 220 hits, but none penetrated her belt and only a small number pierced the deck. Repairs to the damaged ships began immediately, and fresh supplies and ammunition were sent to ready the vessels for action. By late October, the Japanese Army had begun to approach the port, forcing the Chinese to withdraw the Beiyang Fleet across the Bohai Strait to Weihaiwei on 20 October. Zhenyuan remained in Port Arthur while the rest of the fleet left so that repairs could continue to be made, but by early November, the Japanese were poised to seize the port, prompting her to join the rest of the fleet at Weihaiwei.

===== Battle of Weihaiwei =====
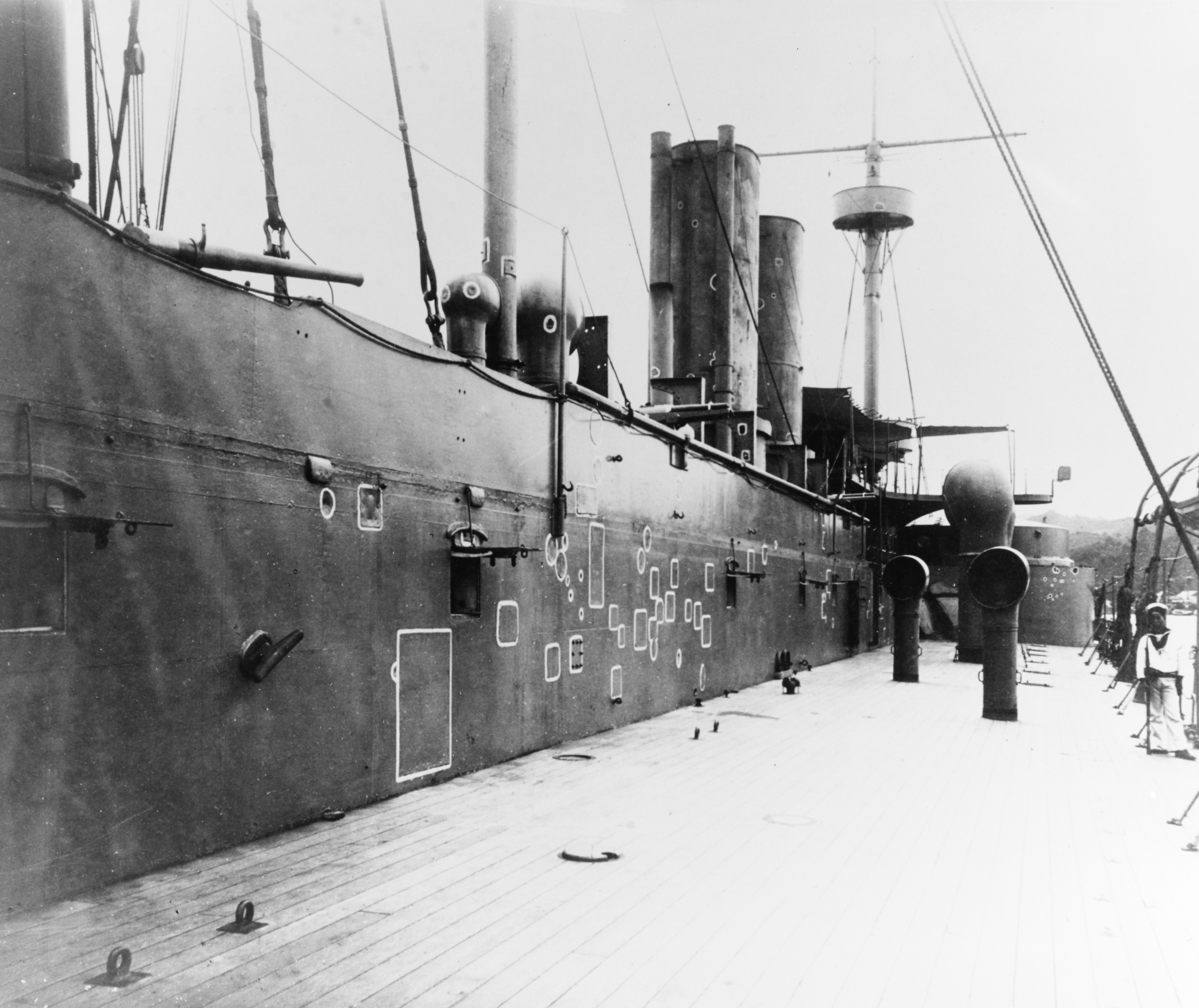
Zhenyuan after the battle

While approaching Weihaiwei on 14 November, Zhenyuan struck a reef as the ship attempted to maneuver around the obstacles that had been erected off the harbor entrance to prevent a Japanese attack. The grounding tore a hole that was 20 ft (6.1 m) long and caused significant flooding, including the port engine room. The vessel remained stuck on the reef for three weeks, listing to port with her main deck awash. The salvage team eventually towed her off the reef and brought the ship into the anchorage at Weihaiwei, where she was run aground to avoid sinking. Divers were sent from Shanghai to patch the hole with concrete. Lin took responsibility for the accident and committed suicide the following day with an overdose of opium. Captain Yang Yung-Lin took his place as the ship's commander. Weihaiwei lacked the dry dock facilities necessary to properly repair Zhenyuan, and the concrete patch, which was completed by January 1895, left her only partially seaworthy, so she was left moored in port. The grounding contributed to a significant decline in morale among the crews of the fleet, since the loss of a fully operational ironclad seriously degraded their ability to resist a Japanese attack.

The Japanese Army had advanced to Weihaiwei by the end of January 1895, launching a major attack on the port on the 30th to begin the Battle of Weihaiwei. They quickly captured the fortifications on the eastern side of the city, which forced the Chinese ships to withdraw to the western portion of the harbor, where they would be out of range for the guns in the fortress. Though Zhenyuan was unable to get underway, her guns could still be used to support the garrison and disrupt Japanese movements ashore. On 1 February, she fired 119 shells to help repel the Japanese troops. Japanese torpedo boats broke into the harbor on the night of 4/5 February and torpedoed Dingyuan, disabling her and prompting Ding to shift his flag to Zhenyuan. The next night, the torpedo boats made another assault on the Chinese fleet, but they missed Zhenyuan and instead sank a cruiser, a training ship, and an auxiliary vessel.

On 9 February, Zhenyuan scored a hit on the cruiser Itsukushima, though the shell failed to detonate. By that time, the Japanese inflicted serious damage on Dingyuan, leading to Ding's decision to scuttle the ship, which provoked many of the senior officers of the Beiyang Fleet to commit suicide, including Yang on 12 February. The next day, the Chinese surrendered, and a party from the Combined Fleet entered the port on 17 February to inspect the vessels in the harbor. They found Zhenyuan to be in salvageable condition, as the only damage to the hull was from the grounding incident. Seized as a war prize, the ship would be repaired and commissioned into the Japanese fleet.

=== Japanese service ===
Chen Yen in service under the Japanese flag

The Japanese refloated the ship and Saikyō Maru, having been repaired after the Battle of the Yalu River, towed her to Port Arthur. There, she was commissioned into the Japanese Navy on 16 March and renamed Chin Yen, the Japanese version of her original name. She then was dry-docked for temporary repairs that lasted from April to June. During this process, a team inspected the damage that had been inflicted during the war for lessons that could be incorporated into future Japanese warships. The primary observation was that side armor should be strengthened instead of deck armor, given the short battle ranges of the day, since close-range direct fire, with its flat trajectory, would most likely strike the side of a ship, rather than pass over the belt.

On 5 July, Chin Yen, the largest vessel in the Japanese fleet and its only capital ship, got underway for a tour of Japan. She first visited Nagasaki from 10 to 16 July, before passing through the Seto Inland Sea, where she stopped in Hiroshima, Kure, and Kobe. She arrived in Yokohama on 28 July and was then assigned to the Yokosuka Naval District for a substantial rebuilding as well as permanent repairs to her wartime damage. The main battery could not be updated apart from the installation of fire-control directors, but the secondary battery was substantially improved.

The Meiji Emperor visited the ship at Yokosuka on 25 November 1896, after which Chin Yen embarked on a tour of Japan to celebrate the country's victory over China. With the Fuji class of modern pre-dreadnought battleships nearing completion, Chin Yen was classified as a second class battleship, though she remained in service with the Combined Fleet until 21 March 1898, when she became the flagship of the Reserve Fleet. By that time, both Fuji-class ships had entered service, replacing her as the largest and most powerful vessels in the fleet. Over the next several years, Chin Yen was occupied with cruises in Japanese waters and visits to numerous ports in the country. During the Boxer Uprising in China, she served with the forces of the Eight Nation Alliance during the Battle of Tientsin, helping to break the siege of the city.

==== Russo-Japanese War ====
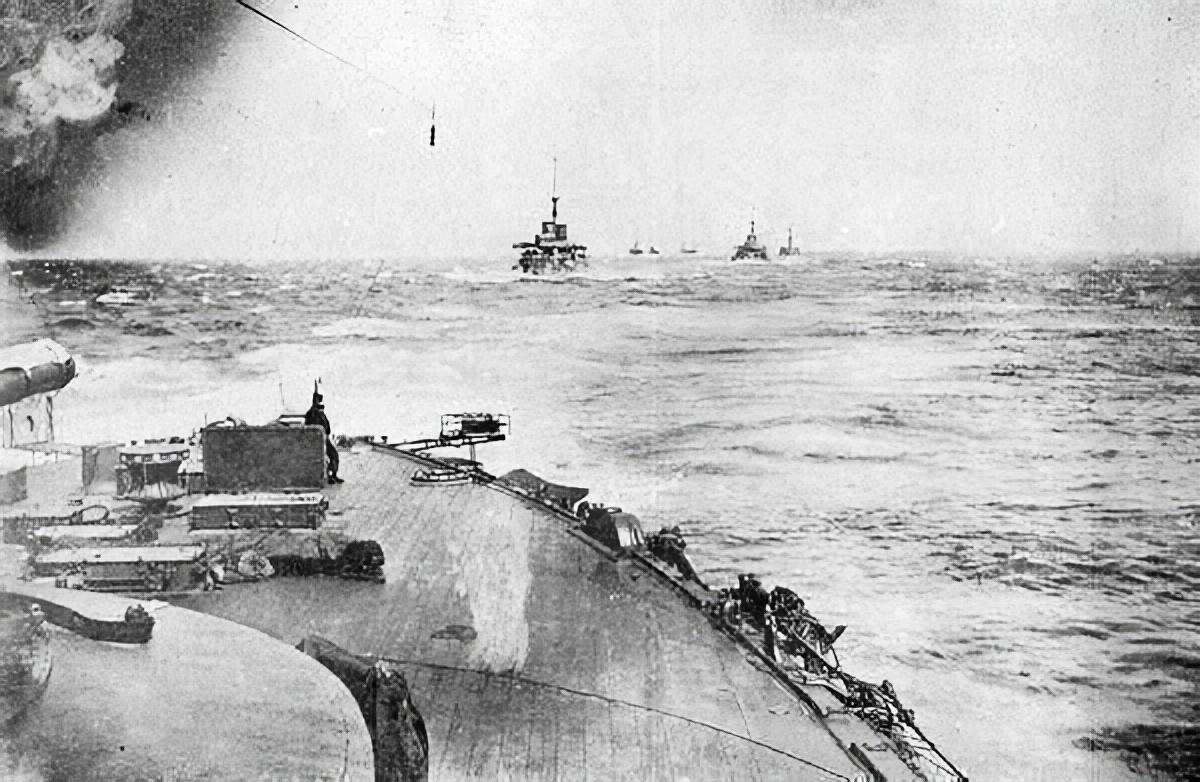
Elements of the Japanese fleet en route to Tsushima

Competition over control of Korea brought Japan into a second conflict, now with the Russian Empire in 1904. The Russo-Japanese War began on 8 February with a surprise torpedo-boat attack on the Russian First Pacific Squadron that occupied Port Arthur. Now obsolete, Chin Yen was assigned to the 5th Squadron of 3rd Fleet, the flagship of Vice Admiral Kataoka Shichirō, along with the three Matsushima-class cruisers. The ships had departed from Sasebo near Nagasaki to join the rest of the fleet in preparation for war already on 6 February.

Chin Yen helped to enforce the blockade of the Russian fleet in Port Arthur, which led to the Battle of the Yellow Sea on 10 August, where she saw action as part of the Main Force under Admiral Tōgō Heihachirō. The battle resulted from a Russian attempt to break the blockade. During the action, which resulted in the Russians being forced back into port, Chin Yen scored several hits on Russian ships in exchange for suffering two hits that did not inflict serious damage. After resuming the blockade, the Japanese fleet also conducted bombardments of Russian positions in the area. On 6 March, Chin Yen and several other ships shelled Vladivostok, where another Russian squadron was located. In a forty-minute bombardment, the Japanese vessels failed to inflict any serious damage.

The ship next saw action at the Battle of Tsushima on 27–28 May 1905; the Russians had assembled a Second Pacific Squadron from vessels of the Baltic Fleet to relieve the ships in Port Arthur and sent it on a very long voyage to Asia. Tōgō intercepted the Russians in the Tsushima Strait and Chin Yen and the rest of 5th Squadron had formed the rear of his line of battle, tasked with engaging their Russian counterparts. The ships sank the supply ship Kamchatka and badly damaged the battleship Knyaz Suvorov. The next morning, the 5th Squadron ships helped to clear the area of any remaining Russian warships still in action and escorted the seven warships that had surrendered to Japanese ports, where they would be taken as war prizes.

Chin Yen and the rest of 5th Squadron then proceeded to Tsushima, where they arrived on 20 June. From there, Chin Yen was detached for a refit in Kure and was then reassigned to the Ōminato Guard District in northern Honshu. The ship got underway on 4 July as part of an amphibious assault force that landed on Sakhalin three days later. After the end of the war on 5 September, Chin Yen went to Port Arthur to escort the armored cruiser Bayan, which had been scuttled there during the war and then raised by a Japanese salvage team. A fleet review was held on 23 October to celebrate Japan's victory, which was to be Chin Yen's last activity as part of the active fleet. The review began with a parade of captured Russian warships, followed by Chin Yen and other former Chinese vessels as part of a display of the spoils the Japanese Navy had seized in the two wars.

==== Later career ====
Chin Yen was reclassified as a first-class coastal defense ship on 11 December. For the next five and a half years, she was used as a training ship for naval cadets and non-commissioned officers. During this period, the ship also took part in training maneuvers with the fleet, as she did in a series of major exercises in October and November 1908 that concluded with a fleet review for the emperor. She was finally decommissioned in April 1911; her training duties were taken by her old opponent Itsukushima. Chin Yen was employed as a target ship for the new armored cruiser Kurama in late 1911 and was later sold to ship breakers in April 1912. The funds raised were used to cover part of the cost of the grand hall at the Naval Academy Etajima in Hiroshima.

Two of the ship's anchors were removed in 1896 during the reconstruction to be preserved in Ueno Park in Tokyo as a monument to Japan's victory. This was a cause of public outrage in China. After Japan's defeat in World War II, the Chinese nationalist government insisted on their return, which was granted by the American occupation authority. The anchors left Tokyo on 1 May 1947 and arrived in Shanghai in October. They were installed at the naval academy in Qingdao and after the Communist victory in the Chinese Civil War, they were moved to the Military Museum of the Chinese People's Revolution in Beijing.
