= HNoMS Viking =

Norwegian Navy vessel

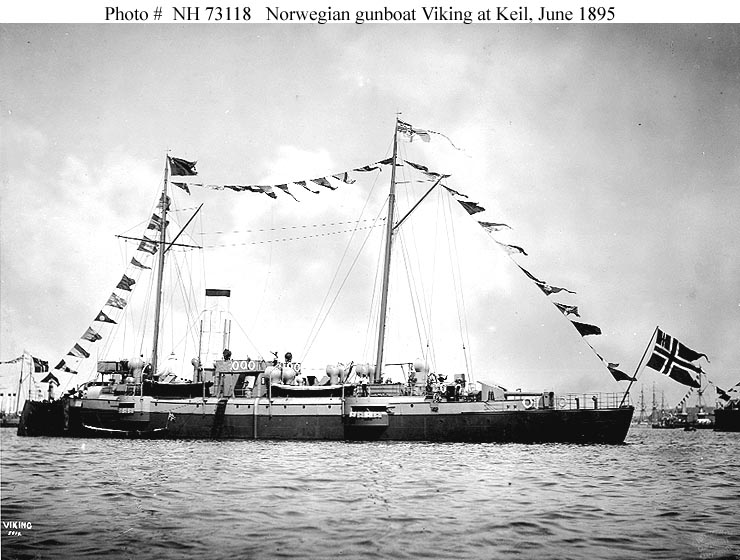
- Viking, dressed with flags at Kiel, Germany, during ceremonies marking the opening of the Kiel Canal, June 1895

History

NorwayNorway
- Name: Viking
- Namesake: The Viking – Norse explorer, warrior, merchant, and pirate of the Viking Age
- Builder: Navy Yard, Karljohansvern
- Yard number: 72
- Launched: 2 April 1891
- Commissioned: 1891
- Decommissioned: 1920
- Notes: Served as a hospital ship for the Norwegian Red Cross

General characteristics
- Class & type: .1 class gunboat
- Displacement: 1,181 long tons (1,200 t)
- Length: 63.5 m (208 ft 4 in)
- Beam: 9.3 m (30 ft 6 in)
- Draught: 3.66 m (12 ft 0 in)
- Propulsion: Reciprocating steam engine, 2,000 hp (1,491 kW), 2 shafts
- Speed: 15 knots (17 mph; 28 km/h)
- Complement: 125
- Armament: 2 × 12 cm (5 in) guns; 4 × 57 mm (2 in) QF guns; 4 × 1-pounder 37 mm (1 in) automatic gun; 3 × 46 cm (18 in) torpedo tube
- Armour: 1.5 in (4 cm) deck

HNoMS Viking was a 1. class gunboat built for the Royal Norwegian Navy. Like the other Norwegian gunboats of her era, she carried a heavy armament on a diminutive hull. The vessel was built at the Naval Yard at Horten, and had yard number 72.

== Characteristics ==
Viking was built of steel covered with a cellulose belt. She was 62 m long with a beam of 9.3 m and a normal draft of 3.96 m. She displaced 1,123 tons. Her engines produced 2,000 ihp and drove two propellers.

Viking was not armored, but had a protective deck of 1.5 in (4 cm) thickness.

Viking's main battery initially consisted of two Krupp 15 cm MRK L/40 guns. It also had four 65 mm quick-firing guns and four 37 mm guns. She had three 'carriages' to launch torpedoes.

== Service ==
Viking served with the Royal Norwegian Navy until stricken in 1920. Later she was used as a hospital ship by the Norwegian Red Cross.
