= 15 cm MRK L/40 =

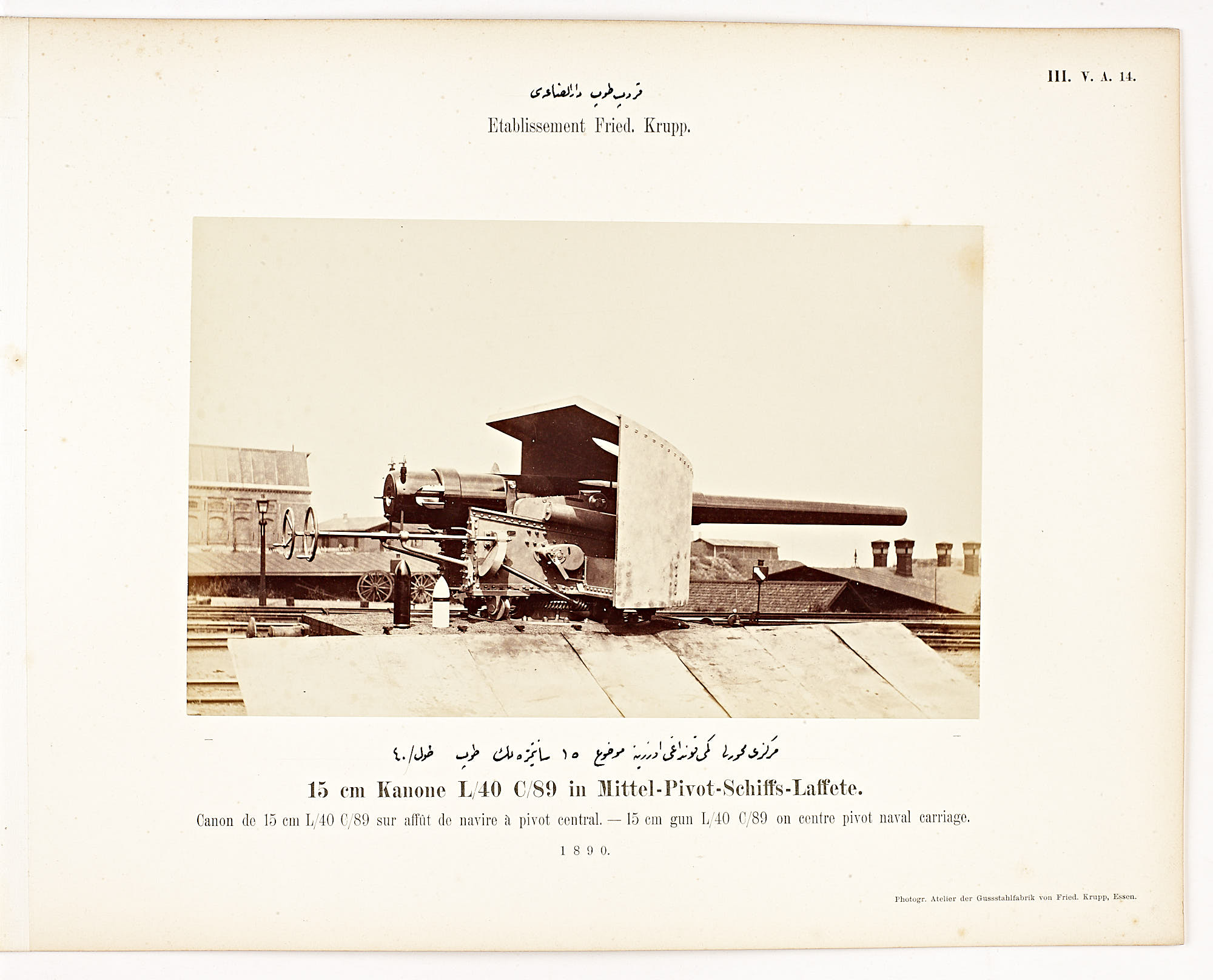
- A 15 cm MRK L/40 C/89 in 1890
- Place of origin: German Empire

Service history
- Used by: Norway (In a test)

Production history
- Designer: Krupp
- Designed: 1889
- Manufacturer: Krupp
- Produced: 1890
- No. built: 2+

Specifications
- Mass: 5,300 kg
- Length: 5,960 mm (L/40)
- Caliber: 149.1 mm
- Muzzle velocity: Pattern C/80: 685 m/s (light grenade); 610 m/s (heavy grenade)

The 15 cm Mantel Ring Kanone L/40 or 15 cm Kanone L/40 was basically a rare, slightly longer version of the 15 cm MRK L/35. It was a long rifled breech loader built-up gun with a Krupp cylindroprismatic sliding breech. Shortly after its introduction, Krupp introduced quick-firing guns of 15 cm caliber, making the 15 cm MRK L/40 practically obsolete.

== Development ==
=== The 15 cm MRK L/35 ===
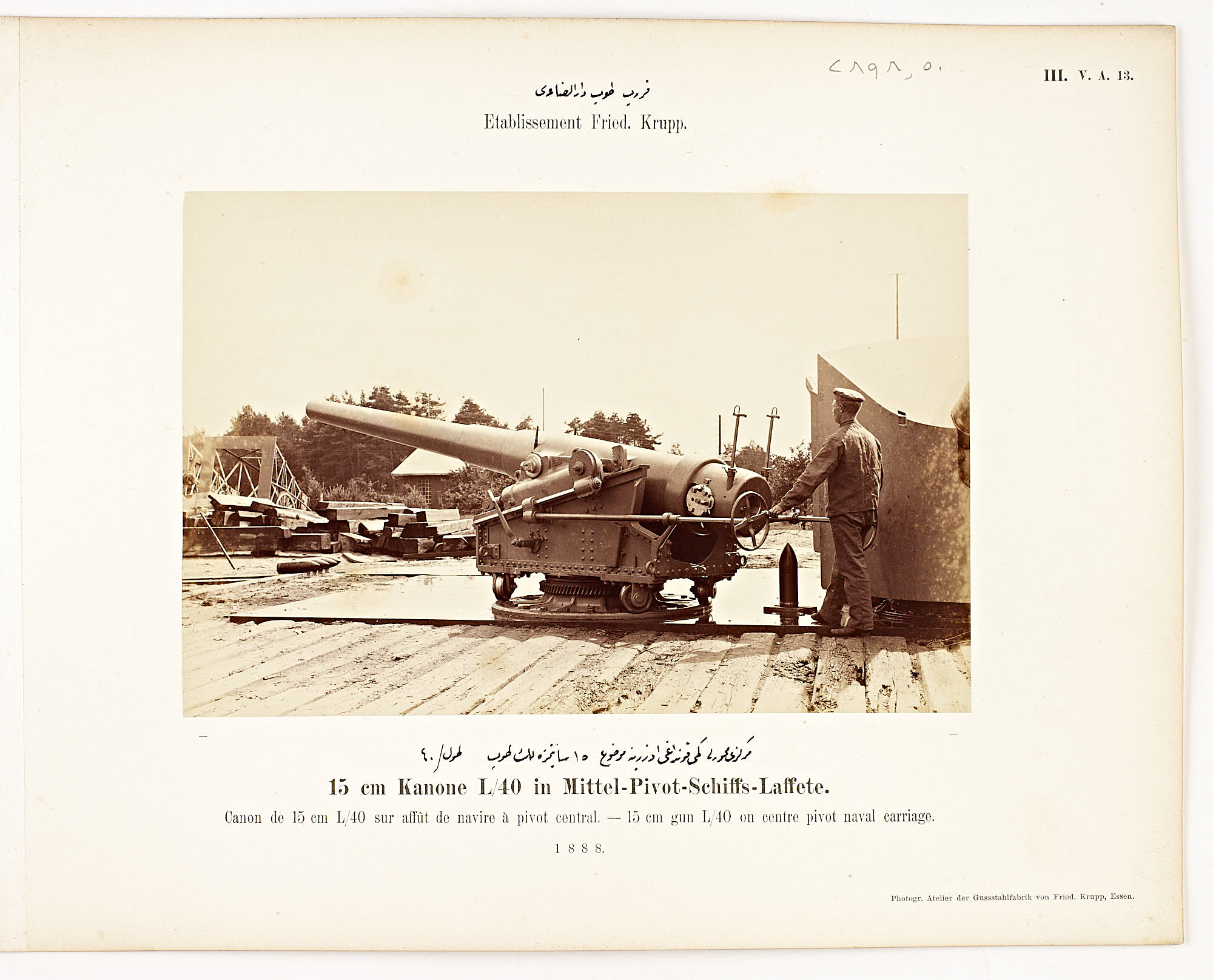
The gun on a photo bearing the year 1888

In March 1882, the first 15 cm Mantel Ring Kanone L/35 was tested in Meppen alongside the new 30.5 cm MRK L/35. It had two conspicuous characteristics: its great length and the great length (L/4) of the projectiles that it fired. The effect of the increased length of the gun was almost obvious, i.e. the velocity of the projectile increased.

The effect of the longer and therefore heavier projectiles was less obvious. The total energy with which the longer projectiles left the barrel was about the same as that of the shorter projectiles. However, the longer projectiles of the same caliber were slowed down by drag only a little more than the shorter ones. Which meant that at realistic combat distances, both projectiles had lost a lot of their velocity, but the longer projectile retained the punch of its weight.

=== The 15 cm MRK L/40 ===
Not much was published about the development of the 15 cm MRK L/40. It showed up in a table about the Krupp Pattern 1886 (C/86) guns. This showed data about guns from 10.5 to 40 cm caliber with lengths of L/35 and L/40. By this table, the 15 cm L/40 would have a weight of 7,600 kg and use a charge of 28.5 kg. The fact that this table gave a uniform velocity of 640 m/s for all calibers from 10.5 to 40 cm, shows that this was a design, not a summary of guns that had actually been built and tested.

Some years later, tables about the Krupp guns of the C/87 and C/89 pattern were published. These also contained a 15 cm MRK L/40, but suffer from the same defect: they were calculations, not data about guns that had been built. This is again shown by the uniform velocity of the guns. Because it is known that at least one C/89 model was built, the characteristics section is based on the C/89 pattern.

From 15 July 1889 till 1 March 1890, Krupp tested the recently invented smokeless powder, a new more effective type of propellant. During these extensive tests, about 20 guns were used. There was no mention of a 15 cm L/40.

From two photographs bearing the years 1888 and 1890, we know that at least two 15 cm MRK L/40 were built.

The photo of a 15 cm L/40 gun bearing the year 1888 does not give much more information than that it was a 15 cm L/40 gun on a centre pivot naval carriage. It could be a gun constructed to the C/86 or C/87 pattern. The problem is that it is not clear what the years printed on official Krupp gun photographs mean. These years could refer to the year that the photo was made, but they could also refer to the year that the gun was designed. The only thing that is sure, is that the image cannot depict the C/89 version of the gun.

The other photo of a 15 cm L/40 gun bears the caption '15 cm gun L/40 C/89 on centre pivot naval carriage' and the year 1890. It therefore shows a 15 cm MRK L/40 gun constructed according to the 1889 pattern. The C/89 data is used in the characteristics section.

So far, we know only about a single 15 cm MRK L/40 leaving the Krupp premises. This is the Norwegian 15 cm MRK L/40 described below. It was described as an M88 model built in 1891, which makes it difficult to link it to either of the photos.

== Characteristics ==
=== The barrel ===
The barrel of the 15 cm MRK L/40 C/87 was 5,960 mm long. The length of bore was 5,540 mm. The barrel weighed 5,300 kg.

The barrel of the 15 cm MRK L/40 C/89 was to be of the same dimensions, but to weigh 5,650 kg, or 350 kg more.

=== The carriage ===
The front or centre pivot carriage of the C/87 gun weighed 5,700 kg. For the C/89, this was to be 6,000 kg.

=== Projectiles ===
The 15 cm MRK L/40 C/87 could fire the old short grenades and the new longer (L/4) grenades. It used a charge of 19 kg of gunpowder. With that, the old 2.8 caliber long steel grenade was propelled to 685 m/s. The heavy 3.5 caliber long steel grenade got a velocity of 610 m/s.

The 15 cm MRK L/40 C/89 would use a charge of 22 kg. This would give the old L/2.8 steel grenade a velocity of 720 m/s. The heavy L/3.5 grenade would attain a velocity of 630 m/s.

== Use ==
=== Norway ===
The Norwegian navy's gunboat HNoMS Viking was meant to be armed with two 15 cm MRK L/40. One of these was a C/88 gun made in 1891. During trials in Horten the barrel burst on 18 September 1891, killing one man and severely wounding an officer.

Previously, this particular gun had been test-fired by Krupp. With the projectiles of 112.2 lb (50.9 kg) and charges of 58.3 lb (26.4 kg) and 41.8 lb (19.0 kg) of a very slow burning gunpowder. This gave velocities of 2,070 ft (630 m) and 1,893 ft (577 m) m/s. During these trials, pressures between 2,600 and 2,690 Atm were measured.

During the trials in Horten, the Norwegians used the prismatic gunpowder P.P. C/82. This gunpowder was used in the smaller charges for the previous 15 cm models. At first 14 rounds were fired with a reduced charge of 26.4 lb (12.0 kg), developing 11.8 tons of pressure. Then a fifteenth round was fired with a charge of 52.8 lb (23.9 kg). This caused the gun to burst at the breech block. During this fatal shot, a pressure of 7,400 Atm was measured and velocity was 637 m/s.
