= Nagasaki incident =

1886 riot of Chinese sailors in Japan

Nagasaki Incident
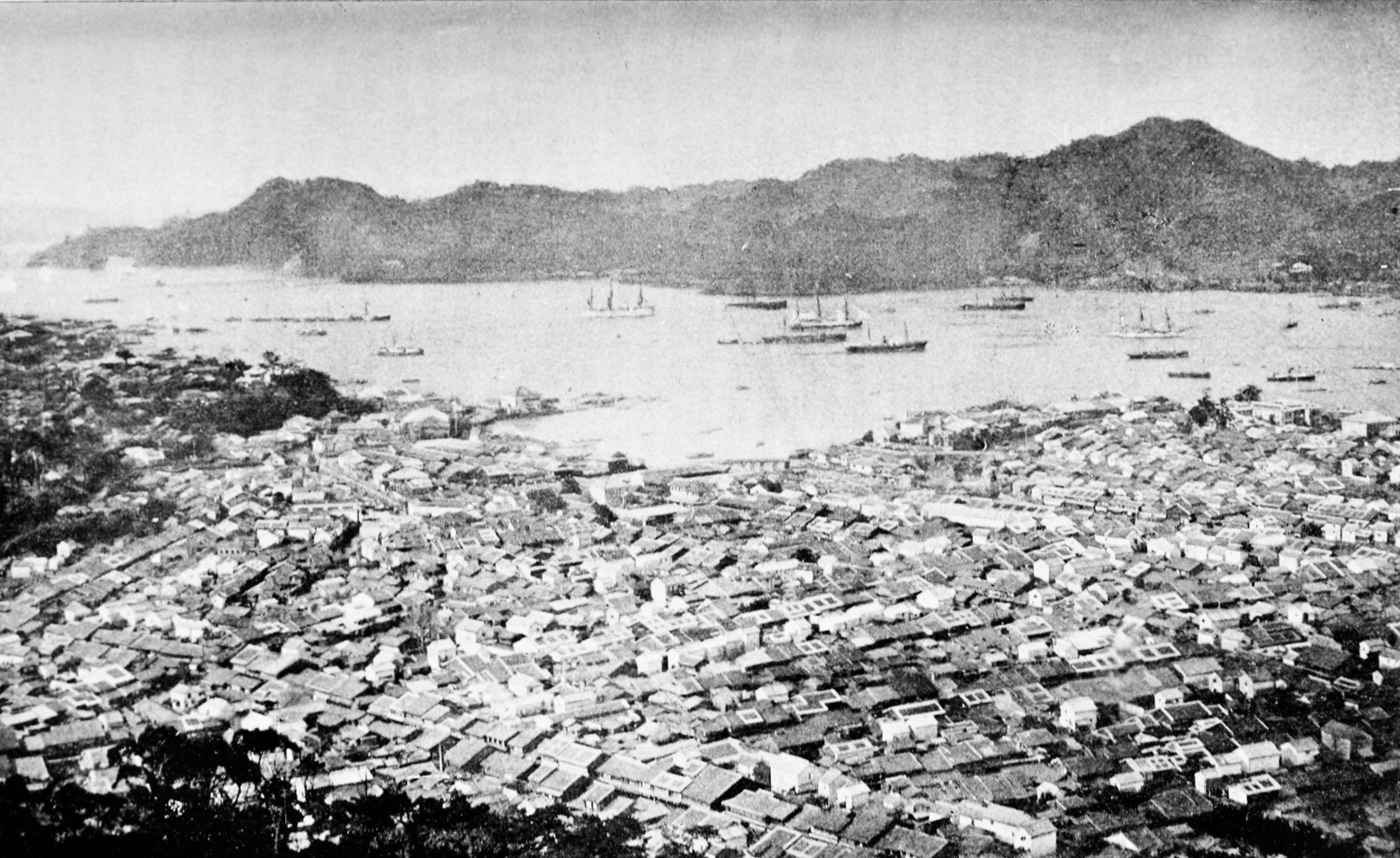
- Date: 13-15 August 1886
- Location: Nagasaki
- Caused by: Beiyang Fleet heading to Nagasaki
- Methods: Rioting
- Result: Anti-Qing sentiments in Japan

Parties
Qing sailors	Nagasaki Prefecture Police Department

Number
500 Chinese sailors	

Casualties and losses
57 total casualties	More than 21 injured

Casualties
- Deaths: 3 dead
- First Sino-Japanese War

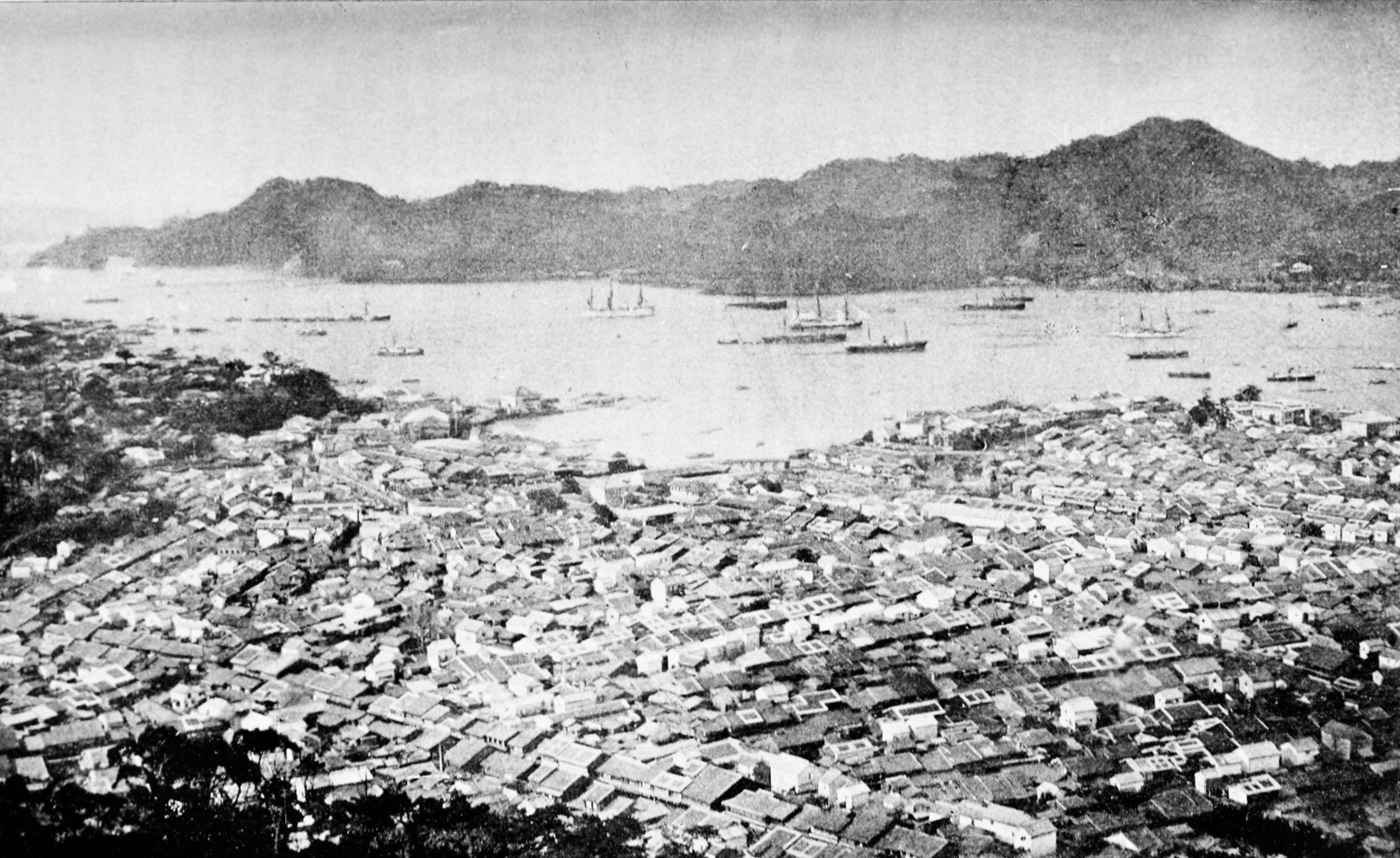
Nagasaki harbor (1893)

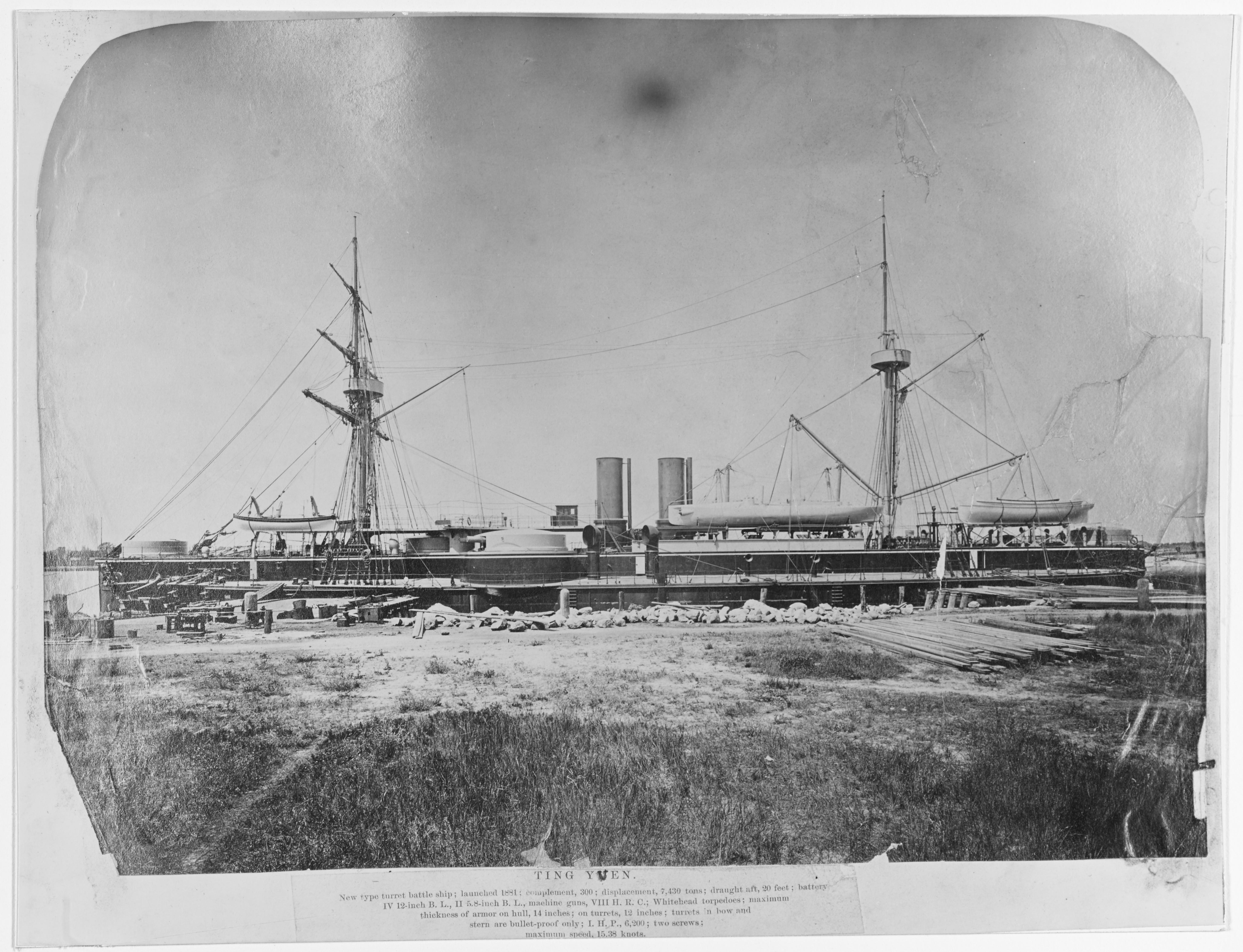
Dingyuan

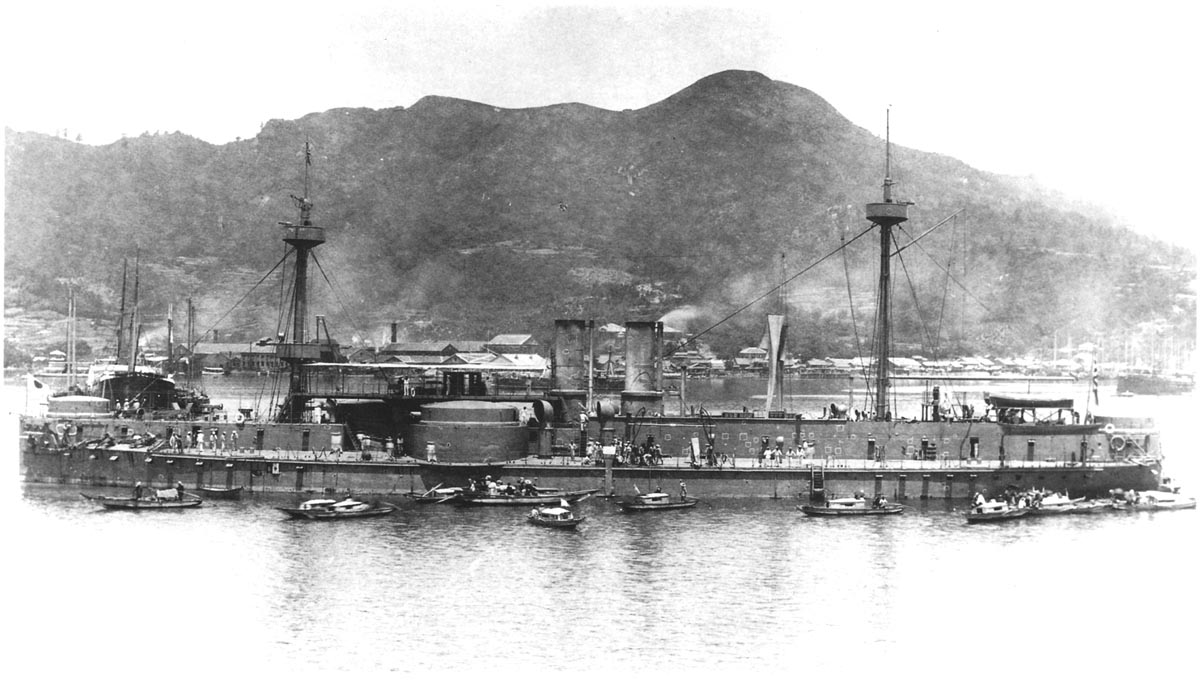
Zhenyuan

The Nagasaki incident (長崎事件, Nagasaki Jiken), also known as the Nagasaki―Qing Navy Incident (長崎清国水兵事件) was an incident took place on August 13, 1886 (the twelfth year of the reign of Emperor Guangxu of the Qing Dynasty) during the Beiyang Fleet visit to Nagasaki, Japan. Some Chinese sailors violated military discipline when they went ashore for shopping, went to local brothels and drank and made troubles. As a result, they clashed with the Japanese police. A Japanese policeman was stabbed and seriously injured, and a Chinese sailor was slightly injured. In February 1887, the two sides reached an agreement under the mediation of the British and German ministers. Both parties compensated the dead and injured persons of the other party.

== Outline ==
On 1 August 1886 (Meiji 19), the Qing dynasty's Beiyang Fleet, consisting of four warships, the Dingyuan, the Zhenyuan, the Jiyuan, and Weiyuan, entered the Nagasaki harbor port during a visit to various major Asian harbours. At that time, Qing China was militarily superior to Meiji Japan. The Dingyuan had more tonnage than the heaviest Japanese cruisers in service, due to Japan's policy of following the Jeune École naval strategy, which emphasized small rapid assault craft. In addition, Japan had recently suffered setbacks in the Kapsin Coup in which around 400 Japanese troops stationed in Joseon Korea were defeated by nearly 2,000 Qing-Joseon soldiers.

On August 13, around 500 Chinese troops went on shore leave, with many visiting the red-light district, leading to altercations with locals. The resulting property damages was blamed on the soldiers. Locals also claimed that drunken Chinese soldiers went around the city pursuing women and children much to public outrage. The Nagasaki Prefecture Police Department attempted to restore order with the help of a large number of local civilians. The policemen engaged in several hand-to-hand battles with the Chinese sailors who used swords purchased from stores; the melees resulted in at least 80 deaths. A sense of unrest subsequently pervaded across the city.

On August 14, at a conference between the governor of Nagasaki prefecture Kusaka Yoshio and the Qing consulate Xuan Cai, the Qing navy prohibited its soldiers from going ashore as a group for one day and agreed to have their troops supervised by officers when on shore leave.

On August 15, at around 1:00 PM, following the cessation of the agreement, about 300 Qing troops went ashore; some were armed with clubs. A group of Qing sailors attacked three police officers, resulting in one death. A driver of a rickshaw (jinrikisha) witnessed the scuffle and, in indignation, tried to punch one of the Qing troops. In response, the Qing sailors rioted. The Nagasaki police responded and again fought with the Qing sailors, resulting in more casualties. On the Qing side, 4 were killed (1 officer and 3 soldiers) and 53 were injured (3 officers and 50 soldiers). On the Japanese side, 2 constables were killed with 3 police officers injured along with 16 more. Several tens of Japanese civilians were also injured.

== Aftermath ==
Combined with the Kapsin Coup of 1884 (Meiji 17), the incident stirred up anti-Qing sentiment in Japan and was regarded as a distant cause to the First Sino-Japanese War. Also, Toyoma Mitsuru created the political association called the Genyosha, which was the first turning away from civil rights theory to sovereign rights theory.

The Qing government did not apologize to Japan for the incident and behaved with confidence in the superiority of their navy. At that time, the Qing possessed the newest model of navy battleships, the Dingyuan. It was thought that the Japanese navy could not match this ship at this time as the German-built Dingyuan possessed more tonnage than the French-built Japanese cruisers that were in service. (The Dingyuan was eventually scuttled after the Battle of Weihaiwei in 1895.) The Qing's confidence was bolstered by the events of the Kapsin Coup where a small Japanese contingent was defeated by a much larger Qing-Joseon garrison.

The Qing successfully made demands to the Japanese government wherein Japanese police would not prohibit the wielding of swords by visiting Qing troops; the Japanese were also forced to pay a large sum for reparations. These concessions however stoked anti-Qing sentiment in Japan, presaging further confrontation.

The incident also led to the breaking of the Qing cypher. A Japanese man named Wu Oogoro picked up a Beiyang Navy sailor's dictionary which was marked with 0-9 between the Chinese characters (Kanji). The Japanese intelligence department subsequently analysed these characters and figures and determined that it was a guide to decipher Qing codes. In order to completely crack the code, Japanese Foreign Minister Mutsu Munemitsu deliberately provided a writing in Chinese characters of moderate length to the Qing ambassador Wang Feng Cao. The next day the Japan Telecom legation successfully intercepted the telegram sent by the embassy to Zongli Yamen. Sato Yoshimaro, a bureaucrat in the telecom legation, used this kanji text with known content to crack the Qing code. This provided Japan with an advantage in the First Sino-Japanese war.

== See also ==
- First Sino-Japanese War
