= 15 cm MRK L/35 =

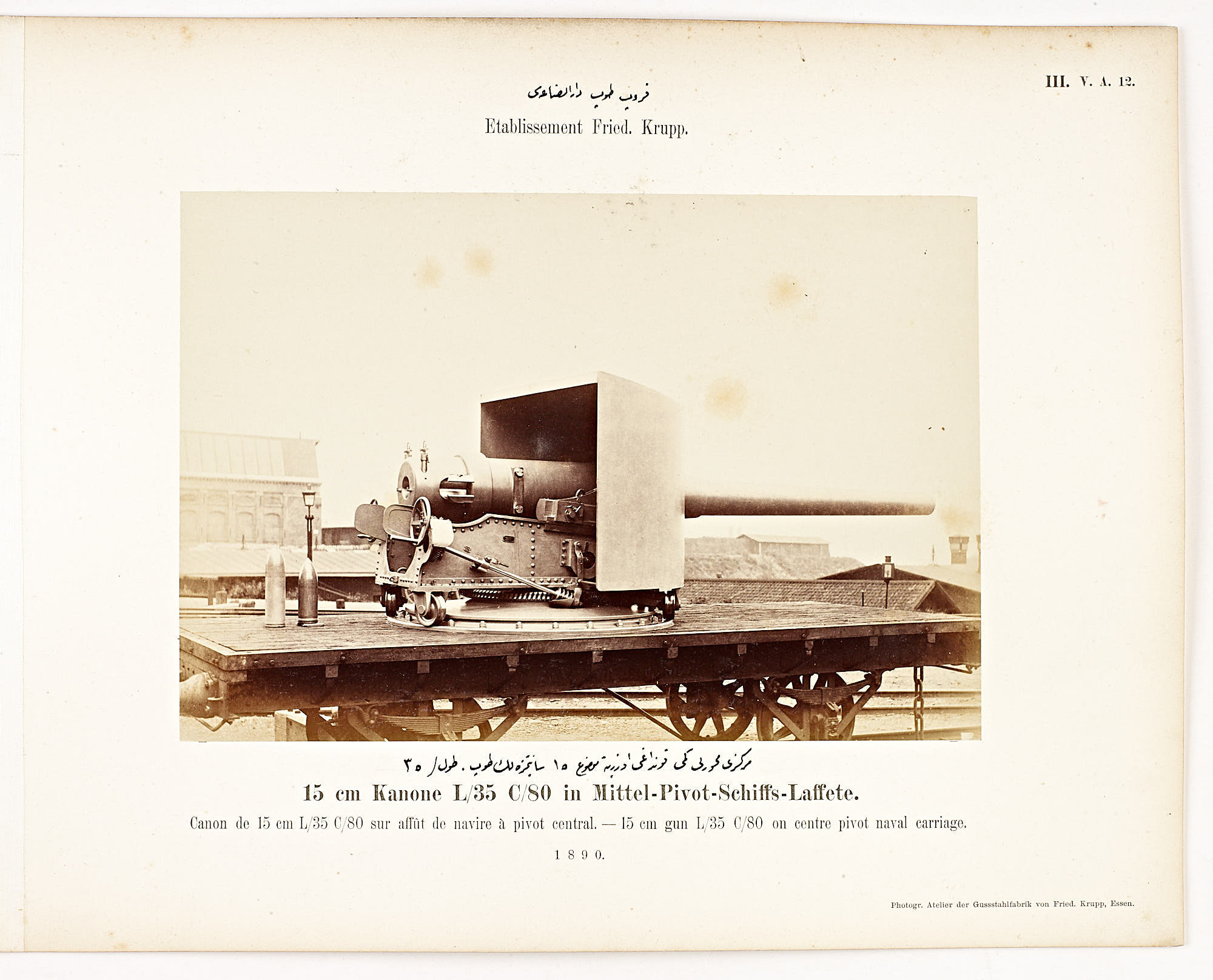
- A 15 cm MRK L/35 C/80 in 1890
- Place of origin: German Empire

Service history
- Used by: Austro-Hungarian Navy; Dutch Navy; Imperial Chinese Navy

Production history
- Designer: Krupp
- Designed: 1880
- Manufacturer: Krupp
- Produced: 1882
- No. built: ?

Specifications
- Mass: 4,470 kg
- Length: 5,220 mm
- Caliber: 149.1 mm
- Muzzle velocity: C/80: 620 m/s (L/2.8 steel grenade); 550 m/s (L/3.5 steel grenade); C/87: 650 m/s (L/2.8 steel grenade); 580 m/s (L/3.5 steel grenade); 757 m/s (L/2.8 w.smokel. gp.)

The 15 cm Mantel Ring Kanone L/35, known as 15 cm Kanone L/35 was a 15 cm 35 caliber long Krupp Mantel Ring Kanone (MRK). It was very similar to the related 15 cm MRK L/25 and 15 cm MRK L/30, and the somewhat later 15 cm MRK L/40. Like these, it was a rifled breech loader built-up gun with a Krupp cylindroprismatic sliding breech.

== Development ==
=== Towards long guns and long projectiles ===
The 15 cm Mantel Ring Kanone L/35 came about when Krupp wanted to profit from a slower burning type of gunpowder invented in the early 1870s, the so-called prismatic gunpowder P.P. C/75. After first lengthening some heavier pieces to a length of 25 calibers (L/25). Krupp started to lengthen the 15 cm RK L/26. In November 1879, it tested a 15 cm MRK L/28, which used a charge of 15 kg of P.P. C/75 and also had earlier innovations like copper driving bands and parallel grooves.

A next innovation were very long projectiles of 3.5 and 4 calibers length, instead of about L/2.8. At longer ranges, these were less vulnerable to drag than shorter higher caliber projectiles of the same weight. However, to remain stable in flight, these longer projectiles required an increase twist rate.

Krupp then designed the so-called Construction C/80. This was an overall specification for the characteristics of guns of 15 cm caliber and higher and with lengths from L/25 to L/35. The next gun that was tested was the prototype gun 15 cm (6 inch) MRK L/30, which had the odd caliber of 6 British inches. In July 1880 this was tested and achieved excellent results.

=== The 15 cm MRK L/35 is tested ===
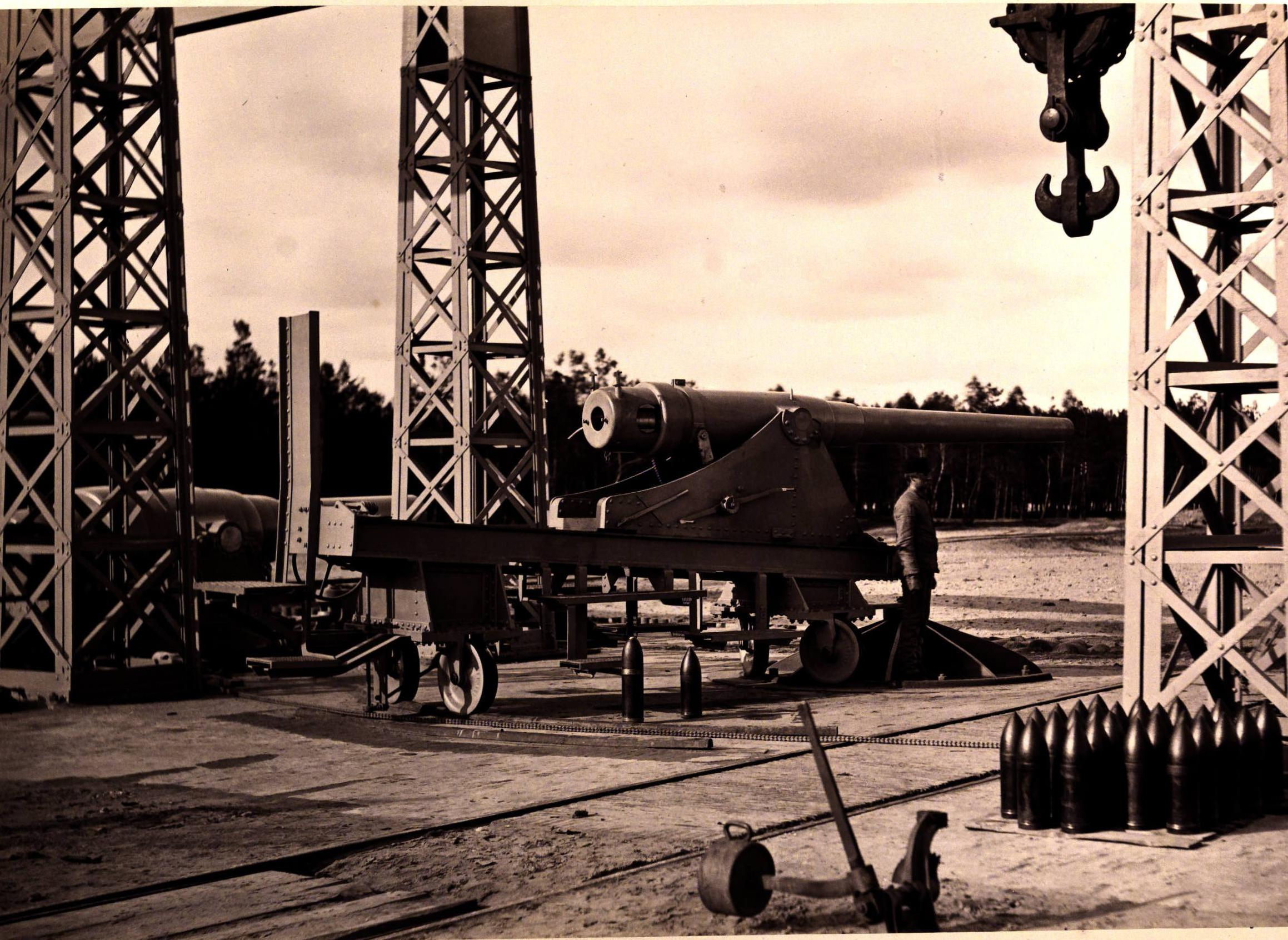
15 cm MRK L/35 C/80 in Meppen in 1882

In March 1882, the first 15 cm Mantel Ring Kanone L/35 was tested in Meppen alongside the new 30.5 cm MRK L/35. In retrospect, this test seems to have been connected to the launch of the first Dingyuan-class ironclad in December 1881, see below.

During the test, the 15 cm L/35 stood on an old coastal carriage that weighed 5,368 kg and provided a firing height of 2.18 m. The carriage allowed elevation to 30 degrees and declination to 6 degrees. The armor-piercing grenades were L/3.35 and L/4 and weighed 51 kg. The charge was 17 kg of single channel prismatic gunpowder of 1.75 density, P.P. C/75.

The caliber of this 15 cm Mantel Ring Kanone L/35 was 149.1 mm. The barrel was 5,220 mm long, length of bore 4,800 mm. It had 36 parallel grooves of 1.5 mm deep and 9 mm wide. The progressive twist rate was 25 calibers. The barrel weighed 4,750 kg including the breech block.

The results of the tests were very good. At the muzzle, velocity was 538 m/s. At 2,000 m, it was 409 and 417 m/s. The main difference to the C/80 plan were the heavier projectiles; 51 kg instead of 38.5 kg. This lowered initial velocity from 605 to 538 m/s, but increased the punch of the gun.

To put these results into perspective, a comparison was made between the old 15 cm Ring Kanonen and the new long Mantel Ring Kanonen. E.g. the projectile of the 15 cm L/35 had a total vis viva of 752 meter ton while that of the RK L/25 had 440. As one of the most important characteristics of a naval gun is weight, this had to be corrected for the weight of the gun. Per 1,000 kg of barrel weight, the difference was 159 vs 110. It meant that the L/35 was about 70% more powerful than the L/26, and that corrected for its higher weight, this was still almost 50% more.

=== The C/87 model ===
Later the C/87 model was developed. During a test it shot long projectiles that weighed 51 kg. With a charge of 19 kg, these attained a speed of 581 m/s at the muzzle. With a charge of 19.5 kg, this was 581 m/s.

== Characteristics ==
=== Versions ===
There were at least two production versions of the 15 cm MRK L/35. The first production version was the C/80, which stands for Construction 1880, i.e. the 1880 design. Later the C/87 followed.

=== The barrel ===
The 15 cm MRK L/35 had a caliber of 14.91 cm. The barrel was 5,220 mm long with a length of bore of 4,800 mm. It weighed 4,470 kg. It seems that the C/87 weighed 4,800 kg.

The early version of the gun had 36 grooves of 1.5 mm deep and 9.5 mm wide. The final twist rate was 372.8 cm or L/25.

The length of the gunpowder part of the chamber was 862 mm with a diameter of 175 mm. It measured 20.59 dm^{3}.

=== The carriage ===
The carriage with a front or centre pivot weighed 5,000 kg. The pivot carriages for the C/87 weighed the same.

=== Projectiles ===
The C/80 model shot long grenades of 51 kg. The steel grenade was 3.5 calibers (L/3.5) long, the cast iron grenade was L/4, and the cast steel one was L/4.5. It could also shoot the older short projectiles of L/2.8 length. The steel grenade weighed 39 kg, the cast iron grenade weighed 31.5 kg, and the shrapnel shot weighed 39 kg.

With 17 kg of gunpowder, the old L/2.8 steel grenade attained a velocity of 620 m/s at the muzzle. The new, heavier L/3.5 steel grenade attained velocity of 550 m/s. The effective punch of the new grenade was only a bit higher at the muzzle. The difference in effectiveness increased with the distance.

The C/87 model also shot short and long projectiles. The difference was a charge of 19 kg. With this charge, the old L/2.8 steel grenade attained a velocity of 650 m/s at the muzzle. The heavy L/3.5 steel grenade attained velocity of 580 m/s. In an 1890 test, 12 kg of a new kind of smokeless powder was used. This resulted in a remarkable increase in the velocity of the short projectile from 650 m/s to 757 m/s.

== Use ==
=== Austro-Hungarian Navy ===
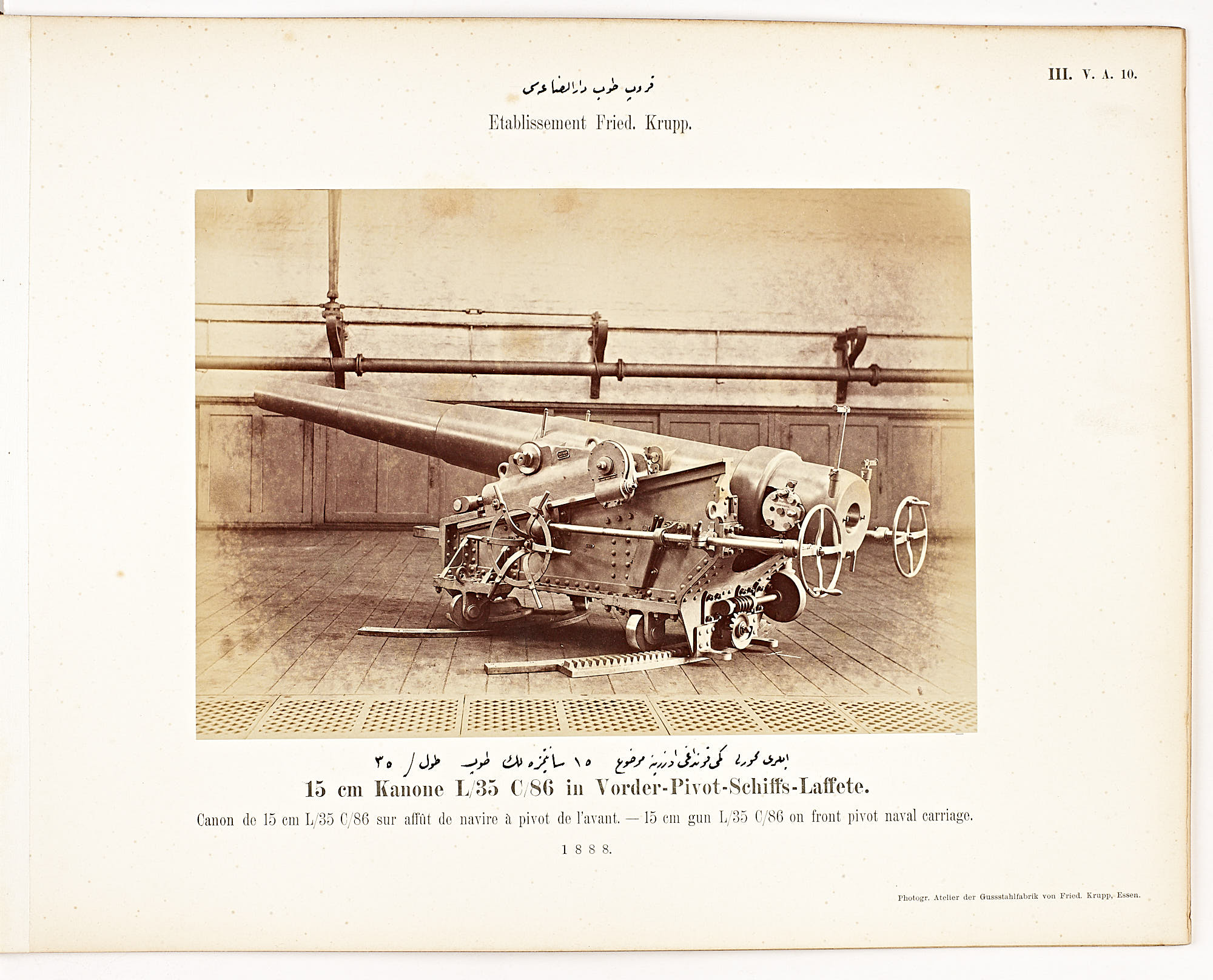
The Austro-Hungarian Navy had the C/86 model

The Austro-Hungarian Navy had the C/80 model and the C/86 model. Kronprinzessin Erzherzogin Stephanie had two 30.5 cm MRK L/35 and also six 15 cm MRK L/35.

=== Chinese Navy ===
- The two Dingyuan-class ironclads were launched for the Chinese navy in Stettin in 1881 and 1882. The two 15 cm guns that each of these ships mounted were noted to be L/35 long. Therefore, it can only have been the 15 cm MRK L/35. Therefore, the Chinese Navy adopted the gun before the German navy did.
- Zhiyuan of the Zhiyuan class - This protected cruiser had one shielded 15 cm SK L/35 gun per side, amidships as its secondary armament.
- The Chinese cruisers Jingyuan and Laiyuan both had two 21 cm L/35 and two 15 cm MRK L/35.

=== Spanish Navy ===
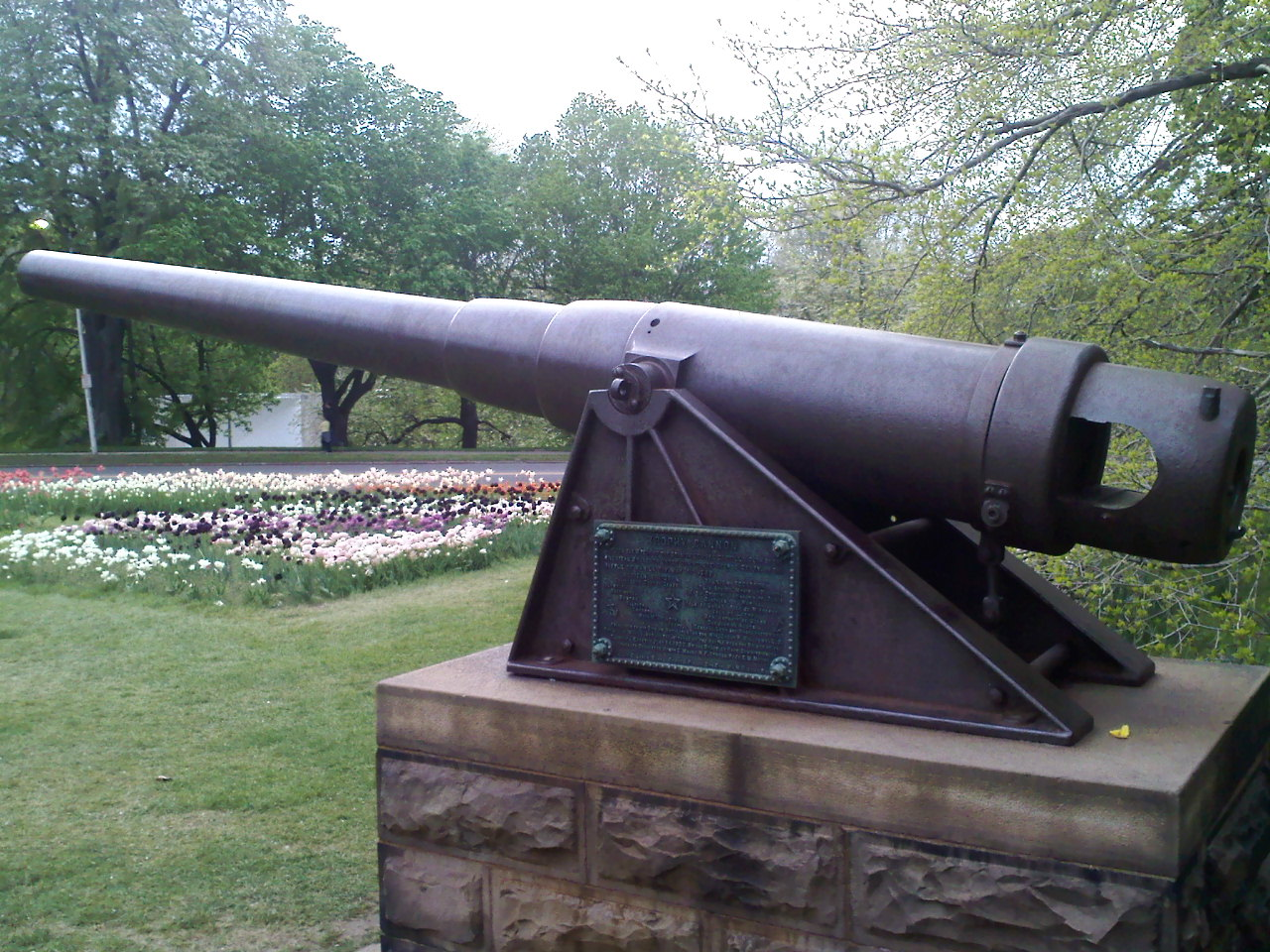
Gun from Spanish cruiser Castilla, sunk at the Battle of Manila Bay in 1898. Near Highland Park, Rochester, NY.

The Spanish cruiser Castilla was re-armed with four 15 cm MRK L/35 in or before 1885.

=== Dutch Navy ===
The Dutch Navy used the 15 cm MRK L/35 as 15 cm A No. 2. Its 15 cm SK L/35 was known as 15 cm No. 1, so without the 'A'. This seems very strange, but the logic is comparable to the German navy using 'Kanone' for 'Mantel Ring Kanone'. The Dutch used the 15 cm A No. 2. on board the small protected cruiser Sumatra. This ship belonged to the Indische Militaire Marine.

Judging by the higher number of grooves, The Dutch 15 cm MRK L/35 was a later model of the gun.

=== Japan ===
Naniwa class - The two ships of this class of protected cruisers had three 15 cm MRK L/35 guns per side, amidships as their secondary armament.

=== German Navy ===
The 15 cm MRK L/30 was taken into use by the German Navy before the 15 cm MRK L/35. That is, if the German Navy used the L/35.

== Further development ==
After creating the 15 cm MRK L/35, it seemed logical to design even longer versions of the same gun. Krupp did just that by designing the 15 cm MRK L/40 C/87 and C/89. However, just as these guns were designed, technical innovations led to the Quick-firing gun. Therefore, the 15 cm SK L/35 became the real successor of the 15 cm MRK L/35.
