= List of ships of the Chinese Navy (1644–1945) =

This is a list of Chinese naval vessels from the Qing Dynasty to the end of World War II (1644–1945), including vessels of the Imperial Chinese Navy (1875–1912), the Republican Beiyang Fleet (1912–1928) and the Republic of China Navy (1924–1945):

Name	Class	Type	Manufacturer	Displacement	Launched	Fate	Source(s)
Keang Soo (江蘇) later Chen Wu (鎮吳)		Dispatch boat	(United Kingdom) J. Samuel White and Company	1289	1863	1867/11/3 Sold to Satsuma Domain as Kasuga Maru; 1870/4 Captured by Imperial Japan as Kasuga; 1894/2/2 Stricken	
Pekin (北京) later Chin T'ai (金台)	Vigilant-class	Gunboat	(United Kingdom) Young, Magnay and Company	860	1856 (as HMS Mohawk, purchased 1862)	1865/12/30 Sold to Egypt	
China (中國) later I T'ung (一統)		Gunboat	(United Kingdom) Devonport Dockyard (United Kingdom) Greenock Foundry Company	913	1862 (as HMS Africa, purchased 1862)	1865/12/30 Sold to Egypt	
Kwang Tung (廣東) later Pai Yueh (百粵)		Dispatch boat	(United Kingdom) Laird	522	1863	1860s Sold to India	
Tien Tsin (天津) later San Wei (三衛)		Dispatch boat	(United Kingdom) Laird	448	1863	Later used as customs cruiser in Canton; 1865/12/30 Sold to Egypt	
Amoy (廈門) later Kuang Wan (廣萬)	Algerine-class	Gunboat	(United Kingdom) R. & H. Green, Blackwall	370	1857 (as HMS Jasper, purchased 1862)	1865/12/30 Sold to Egypt	
Mokeden (盛京) later Te Sheng (得勝)		Transport	Unknown	Unknown	1860s (as Ballarat)	1860s Auctioned in UK	
Thule (都利)		Transport	Unknown	Unknown	1860s	1860s Sold to India; Later transferred to Zanzibar	
Dai Ching (大清)		Gunboat	(United Kingdom) James C. Jewett & Co.	520	1863	1863/4/21 Sold by manufacturer to US Navy; 1865/1/26 Burnt	
Kiang Soo (江蘇)	Kiang Soo-class	Gunboat	(United Kingdom) James C. Jewett & Co.	183	1863	1863/6/22 Sold to Union Navy as Fuchsia; 1865/8/5 Sold as commercial ship	
Chih Kiang (浙江)	Kiang Soo-class	Gunboat	(United Kingdom) James C. Jewett & Co.	183	1863	1863/6/22 Sold to Union Navy as Tulip; 1864/11/11 Lost in explosion at Ragged Point, Virginia	
Ting Yuen (定遠)	Ting Yuen-class	Ironclad	(German Empire) Stettiner Maschinebau A.G. Vulcan	7220	1881	1895/2/6 or 1895/2/10 Sunk by Japanese torpedoes during Battle of Weihaiwei	
Chen Yuen (鎮遠)	Ting Yuen-class	Ironclad	(German Empire) Stettiner Maschinebau A.G. Vulcan	7220	1882	1895/2/17 Captured by Japan after Battle of Weihaiwei as Chin'en; 1911/4/1 Stricken	
Ping Yuen (平遠) formerly Lung Wei (龍威)		Ironclad	(Qing dynasty) Fujian Maritime Administration	2150	1888	1895/2/12 or 1895/2/17 Captured by Japan as Ping Yuen Go; 1900 Renamed as Heien; 1904/9/18 Mined off Pigeon Bay (Piegen Bay) west of Port Arthur	
Chao Yung (超勇)	Tsukushi-class	Cruiser	(United Kingdom) Mitchell	1380	1880 or 1881	1894/9/17 Sunk during Battle of the Yalu River	
Yang Wei (揚威)	Tsukushi-class	Cruiser	(United Kingdom) Mitchell	1380	1881	1894/9/17 Sunk during Battle of the Yalu River	
Tsi Yuen (濟遠)		Cruiser	(German Empire) Stettiner Maschinebau A.G. Vulcan	2300-2355	1883	1895/2/12 or 1895/2/17 Captured by Japan after Battle of Weihaiwei as Saien; 1904/11/30 Mined off Port Arthur	
Nan Chen (南琛)	Nan Chen-class (Note: An improvement of the Kai Chi-class)	Cruiser	(German Empire) Howaldt	2200	1883	1903 or 1910 Stricken	
Nan Shui (南瑞)	Nan Chen-class	Cruiser	(German Empire) Howaldt	2200	1884	1919 or 1920 Stricken	
Chih Yuen (致遠)	Chih Yuen-class	Armoured cruiser	(United Kingdom) Armstrong Elswick Shipyard	2300	1886	1894/9/17 Sunk during Battle of the Yalu River	
Ching Yuen (靖遠)	Chih Yuen-class	Armoured Cruiser	(United Kingdom) Armstrong Elswick Shipyard	2300	1886	1895/2/9 Sunk during Battle of Weihaiwei; 1896-7 Raised and scrapped	
King Yuen (經遠)	King Yuen-class (Note: Based on the French corvette Résolue (1872))	Armoured Cruiser	(German Empire) Stettiner Maschinebau A.G. Vulcan	2900	1887	1894/9/17 Sunk during Battle of the Yalu River	
Lai Yuen (來遠)	King Yuen-class	Armoured Cruiser	(German Empire) Stettiner Maschinebau A.G. Vulcan	2900	1887	1895/2/5 or 1895/2/6 Sunk by Kotaka during Battle of Weihaiwei	
Yang Wu (揚武)	King Yuen-class	Corvette	(Qing dynasty) Fujian Maritime Administration	1560-1608	1872	1884/8/23 Sunk by French Torpedo Boat No. 46 during Battle of Fuzhou	
Hai An (海安) formerly Chen An (鎮安)	Hai An-class (Note: Based on the French corvette Armorique (1863))	Frigate	(Qing dynasty) Jiangnan Shipyard	2630-2800	1872	1878 Stricken	
Yu Yuen (馭遠)	Hai An-class	Frigate	(Qing dynasty) Jiangnan Shipyard	2630-2800	1873	1885/2/14 Sunk by friendly fire from Teng Ching, or 1885/2/15 Sunk by French ironclad Bayard at Battle of Shipu	
Kai Chi (開濟)	Kai Chi-class (Note: Based on the French frigate Duguay-Trouin (1873))	Frigate	(Qing dynasty) Fujian Maritime Administration	2110-2200	1882-1883	1902/6/22 Sunk by accidental explosion in Nanjing	
Ching Ching (鏡清)	Kai Chi-class	Frigate	(Qing dynasty) Fujian Maritime Administration	2100 or 2110-2200	1886	1918 or 1920 Stricken	
Huan Tai (寰泰)	Kai Chi-class	Frigate	(Qing dynasty) Fujian Maritime Administration	2110-2200	1886	1903/8/17 Sunk by collision with RMS Empress of India	
Pao Min (保民)		Corvette	(Qing dynasty) Jiangnan Shipyard	1477 or 1480	1885	1903 Hulked; 1920/3 Sold in Vietnam; 1920 Stricken	
Fu Sheng (福勝)	Fu Sheng-class	Rendel gunboat	(United Kingdom) Laird	256	1875	1884/8/23 Sunk during Battle of Fuzhou	
Chen Sheng (建勝)	Fu Sheng-class	Rendel gunboat	(United Kingdom) Laird	256	1875	1884/8/23 Sunk during Battle of Fuzhou	
Lung Hsiang (龍驤) formerly Alpha	Lung Hsiang-class	Rendel gunboat	(United Kingdom) Mitchell	320	1876	1900s or 1910s Stricken	
Hu Wei (虎威) formerly Beta	Lung Hsiang-class	Rendel gunboat	(United Kingdom) Mitchell	320	1876	1900s or 1910s Stricken	
Fei Ting (飛霆) formerly Gamma	Fei Ting-class	Rendel gunboat	(United Kingdom) Mitchell	400-420	1876	1905/8/13 Sunk by accidental explosion	
Tse Tien (策電) formerly Delta	Fei Ting-class	Rendel gunboat	(United Kingdom) Mitchell	420	1876	1918 Sold c. 1929 Stricken	
Chen Pei (鎮北) formerly Epsilon	Chen Pei-class (Note: An improvement of the Fei Ting-class)	Rendel gunboat	(United Kingdom) Mitchell	430-440	1879	1895 Captured by Japan as Chinhoku; 1906/6/8 Stricken	
Chen Nan (鎮南) formerly Zeta	Chen Pei-class	Rendel gunboat	(United Kingdom) Mitchell	430-440	1879	1895 Captured by Japan as Chinnan; 1908/5/15 Stricken	
Chen His (鎮西) formerly Eta	Chen Pei-class	Rendel gunboat	(United Kingdom) Mitchell	430-440	1879	1895 Captured by Japan as Chinzei; 1908/5/23 Sold to civil service	
Chen Tung (鎮東) formerly Theta	Chen Pei-class	Rendel gunboat	(United Kingdom) Mitchell	430-440	1879	1895 Captured by Japan as Chintō; 1906/6/8 Stricken	
Chen Chung (鎮中) formerly Iota	Chen Chung-class (Note: An improvement of the Chen Pei-class)	Rendel gunboat	(United Kingdom) Mitchell	440	1880	1895 Captured by Japan as Chinchu; 1906/6/8 Stricken	
Chen Pien (鎮邊) formerly Kappa	Chen Chung-class	Rendel gunboat	(United Kingdom) Mitchell	440	1880	1895 Captured by Japan as Chinpen; 1906/6/8 Stricken	
Hai Ting Ching (海鏡清) formerly Lambda also Chen Hai	Chen Chung-class	Rendel gunboat	(United Kingdom) Mitchell	440	1880	1900s or 1929 Stricken	
Hui Chi (惠吉) formerly T'ien Chi (恬吉)		Gunboat	(Qing dynasty) Jiangnan Shipyard	600	1868	1878 Stricken	
Wan Nien Ching (萬年清)		Gunboat	(Qing dynasty) Fujian Maritime Administration	1450	1869	1887/1/9 Lost in collision with P. & O. Nepal	
Tsao Chiang (操江)		Gunboat	(Qing dynasty) Jiangnan Shipyard	600-640	1869-1876	1894/7/25 Captured by Japanese cruiser Akitsushima and renamed Sōkō; 1903/5/22 Sunk in accident 1903/7/9 Refloat as border patrol boat 1924 Sold as commercial vessel Sōkō Maru	
Tse Hai (測海)		Gunboat	(Qing dynasty) Jiangnan Shipyard	600 or 730	1869	1918 Stricken	
Mei Yuen (湄雲)	Mei Yuen-class	Gunboat	(Qing dynasty) Fujian Maritime Administration	515-578	1869	1895 Captured by Japan as Miun; Later returned to China after Triple Intervention; Later stricken	
Foo Hsing (福星)	Mei Yuen-class	Gunboat	(Qing dynasty) Fujian Maritime Administration	515-578	1870	1884/8/23 Sunk by the French during Battle of Fuzhou	
Wei Ching (威靖)		Gunboat	(Qing dynasty) Jiangnan Shipyard	1000	1870	1905 Sold	
Chen Hai (鎮海)	Chen Hai-class (Note: An improvement of the Mei Yuen-class)	Gunboat	(Qing dynasty) Fujian Maritime Administration	572-578	1871	Unknown	
Ching Yuen (靖遠)	Chen Hai-class	Gunboat	(Qing dynasty) Fujian Maritime Administration	578	1872	1918 Stricken	
Chen Wei (振威)	Chen Hai-class	Gunboat	(Qing dynasty) Fujian Maritime Administration	578	1872	1884/8/23 Sunk by Villars during Battle of Fuzhou; 1918 Stricken	
Fu Po (伏波)	Fu Po-class	Gunboat	(Qing dynasty) Fujian Maritime Administration	1258	1870	1910s/1930 Stricken	
An Lan (安瀾)	Fu Po-class	Gunboat	(Qing dynasty) Fujian Maritime Administration	1258	1871	1874/9/26 Sunk in accident	
Fei Yun (飛雲)	Fu Po-class	Gunboat	(Qing dynasty) Fujian Maritime Administration	1258	1872	1884/8/23 Sunk during Battle of Fuzhou; Later refloated, further fate unknown	
Chi An (濟安)	Fu Po-class	Gunboat	(Qing dynasty) Fujian Maritime Administration	1258	1873	1884/8/23 Sunk during Battle of Fuzhou	
Yuan Kai (元凱)	Wei Yuen-class, or Fu Po-class	Gunboat	(Qing dynasty) Fujian Maritime Administration	1258	1875	1930 Stricken	
King Ou (金甌) also known as Tiong Sing		Rendel gunboat	(Qing dynasty) Jiangnan Shipyard	200	1875	1895 Captured by Japan during Battle of Weihaiwei as Hei Yuen; Later returnted to China as Tiong Sing? c. 1950 Renamed to King Ou; 1914 Stricken	
Yi Hsiang (藝新)		Gunboat	(Qing dynasty) Fujian Maritime Administration	245	1876	Unknown	
Teng Ying Chow (登瀛洲)	Wei Yuen-class, or Fu Po-class	Gunboat	(Qing dynasty) Fujian Maritime Administration	1258	1876	1918/1920 Stricken	
Wei Yuen (威遠)	Wei Yuen-class	Gunboat	(Qing dynasty) Fujian Maritime Administration	1100-1268	1877	1895/2/6 Sunk by Japanese torpedo boat Dai Jyuichi Gō during Battle of Weihaiwei	
Chao Wu (超武)	Wei Yuen-class	Gunboat	(Qing dynasty) Fujian Maritime Administration	1209	1878	1930 Stricken	
Teng Ching (澄慶)	Wei Yuen-class	Gunboat	(Qing dynasty) Fujian Maritime Administration	1100-1268	1880	1885/2/15 Sunk by friendly fire from Yu Yuen, or 1885/2/15 Sunk by French ironclad Bayard at Battle of Shipu	
Heng Hai (橫海)	Wei Yuen-class	Gunboat	(Qing dynasty) Fujian Maritime Administration	1268	1884	1886/3/17 Sunk in accident	
Ching Ch'ing	Wei Yuen-class	Gunboat	(Qing dynasty) Fujian Maritime Administration	1268	1884	Unknown	
Kuang Chia (廣甲)	Wei Yuen-class	Gunboat	(Qing dynasty) Fujian Maritime Administration	1296-1300	1887	1894/9/17 Sunk in accident, or 1894/9/17 Badly damaged by the Japanese during the Battle of the Yalu River and beached	
Hai Tung Hung (海東雄)		Rendel gunboat	(Qing dynasty) Whampoa Dockyard, Guangdong	430	1880	c. 1918 Stricken	
Kuang Yuan (廣元)	Kuang Yuan-class	Gunboat	(Qing dynasty) Whampoa Dockyard, Guangdong	300	1886	c. 1929 Stricken	
Kuang Heng (廣亨)	Kuang Yuan-class	Gunboat	(Qing dynasty) Whampoa Dockyard, Guangdong	300	1886	c. 1929 Stricken	
Kuang Li (廣利)	Kuang Yuan-class	Gunboat	(Qing dynasty) Whampoa Dockyard, Guangdong	300	1886	c. 1929 Stricken	
Kuang Chien (廣貞)	Kuang Yuan-class	Gunboat	(Qing dynasty) Whampoa Dockyard, Guangdong	300	1886	c. 1929 Stricken	
Kuang Woo (廣戊)	Kuang Woo-class	Gunboat	(Qing dynasty) Whampoa Dockyard, Guangdong	560	1886 or 1887-89	c. 1929 Stricken	
Kuang Chi (廣己)	Kuang Woo-class	Gunboat	(Qing dynasty) Whampoa Dockyard, Guangdong	560	1886 or 1887-89	c. 1929 Stricken	
Kuang Keng (廣庚)	Kuang Woo-class	Gunboat	(Qing dynasty) Whampoa Dockyard, Guangdong	320 or 560	1889	c. 1929 Stricken	
Kuang King (廣金)	Kuang King-class	Gunboat	(Qing dynasty) Whampoa Dockyard, Guangdong	320 or 600	1890	c. 1929 Stricken	
Kuang Yu (廣玉)	Kuang King-class	Gunboat	(Qing dynasty) Whampoa Dockyard, Guangdong	320 or 600	1890	c. 1929 Stricken	
Kuang Yi (廣乙)	Kuang Yi-class	Cruiser	(Qing dynasty) Fujian Maritime Administration	1000	1889	1894/7/25 Scuttled after badly damaged in the Battle of Pungdo	
Kuang Ping (廣丙)	Kuang Yi-class	Cruiser	(Qing dynasty) Fujian Maritime Administration	1000	1891	1895 Captured by Japan as Kōhei; 1895/12/21 Sunk in accident	
Fu Ching (福清) formerly Kuang Ting (廣丁)	Kuang Yi-class, or Nan Chen-class	Cruiser	(Qing dynasty) Fujian Maritime Administration	1000	1893	1898/6 Sunk in a storm	
Kan I (乾一) later Lushun Project I (旅順工程一號)	Vulcan first class (Kan-class)	Torpedo boat	(German Empire) Stettiner Maschinebau A.G. Vulcan	28	1881-1882	Unknown	
Kan II (乾二) later Lushun Project II (旅順工程二號)	Vulcan first class (Kan-class)	Torpedo boat	(German Empire) Stettiner Maschinebau A.G. Vulcan	28	1881-1882	Unknown	
Ting I (定一)	Vulcan second class (Ting-class)	Torpedo boat	(German Empire) Stettiner Maschinebau A.G. Vulcan	15.7	1882-3	1895/2/7 Sunk in combat	
Ting II (定二)	Vulcan second class (Ting-class)	Torpedo boat	(German Empire) Stettiner Maschinebau A.G. Vulcan	15.7	1882-3	1895/2/7 Sunk in combat	
Chen I (鎮一)	Vulcan second class (Ting-class)	Torpedo boat	(German Empire) Stettiner Maschinebau A.G. Vulcan	15.7	1882-3	1895/2/7 Sunk in combat	
Chen II (鎮二)	Vulcan second class (Ting-class)	Torpedo boat	(German Empire) Stettiner Maschinebau A.G. Vulcan	15.7	1882-3	1895/1/2 Sunk by friendly fire from Wei Yuen, or 1895/2/7 or 1895/2/8 Captured by the Japanese as Dai Nijyuhachi Gō	
Chong Chia (中甲) (Note: Could be alternate name for Kan I)	Vulcan second class (Chong-class)	Torpedo boat	(German Empire) Stettiner Maschinebau A.G. Vulcan	15.7	1880s	1895/2/7 Sunk in combat	
Chong Yi (中乙) (Note: Could be alternate name for Kan II)	Vulcan second class (Chong-class)	Torpedo boat	(German Empire) Stettiner Maschinebau A.G. Vulcan	15.7	1880s	1895/2/7 Sunk in combat	
Lei Lung (雷龍)	Lei Lung-class	Torpedo boat	(German Empire) Stettiner Maschinebau A.G. Vulcan	58 or 66	1883	1925 Stricken	
Lei Fu (雷虎)	Lei Lung-class	Torpedo boat	(German Empire) Stettiner Maschinebau A.G. Vulcan	58 or 66	1883	1925 Stricken	
Lei Chung (雷中)	Vulcan third class (Lei Chung-class)	Torpedo boat	(German Empire) Stettiner Maschinebau A.G. Vulcan	74	1884	1925 Stricken	
You I (右一)	Vulcan third class (Lei Chung-class)	Torpedo boat	(German Empire) Stettiner Maschinebau A.G. Vulcan	74	1884	1895/2/7 Sunk in combat Later refloat by Japan as Dai Nijyunana Gō; 1908/4/1 Stricken	
Lei Chen (雷乾)	Bagua-class	Torpedo boat	(German Empire) Elbing Schichau	27	1885-6	1925 Stricken	
Lei Kun (雷坤)	Bagua-class	Torpedo boat	(German Empire) Elbing Schichau	27	1885-6	1925 Stricken	
Lei Li (雷離)	Bagua-class	Torpedo boat	(German Empire) Elbing Schichau	27	1885-6	1925 Stricken	
Lei Kan (雷坎)	Bagua-class	Torpedo boat	(German Empire) Elbing Schichau	27	1885-6	1925 Stricken	
Lei Chien (雷震)	Bagua-class	Torpedo boat	(German Empire) Elbing Schichau	27	1885-6	1925 Stricken	
Lei Sun (雷巽)	Bagua-class	Torpedo boat	(German Empire) Elbing Schichau	27	1885-6	1925 Stricken	
Lei Ken (雷艮)	Bagua-class	Torpedo boat	(German Empire) Elbing Schichau	27	1885-6	1925 Stricken	
Lei Tui (雷兌)	Bagua-class	Torpedo boat	(German Empire) Elbing Schichau	27	1885-6	1925 Stricken	
Lei Chung	Bagua-class	Torpedo boat	(German Empire) Elbing Schichau	27	1885-6	1925 Stricken	
Fu Lung (福龍)		Torpedo boat	(German Empire) Elbing Schichau	120	1885	1895/2/7 Captured by Japan as Fukuryū; 1909/4/1 Stricken	
Tso I (左一)		Torpedo boat	(United Kingdom) Yarrow	27 or 90	1886-1887	Unknown	
Tso II (左二) formerly Tso I (左一)	Vulcan third class (Lei Lung-class)	Torpedo boat	(German Empire) Stettiner Maschinebau A.G. Vulcan	66	1882-3	1895/2/7 Sunk in combat	
Tso III (左三) formerly Tso II (左二)	Vulcan third class (Lei Lung-class)	Torpedo boat	(German Empire) Stettiner Maschinebau A.G. Vulcan	66	1882-3	1895/2/7 Sunk in combat	
You II (右二)	Vulcan third class (Lei Lung-class)	Torpedo boat	(German Empire) Stettiner Maschinebau A.G. Vulcan	66	1882-3	1895/2/7 Sunk in combat	
You III (右三)	Vulcan third class (Lei Lung-class)	Torpedo boat	(German Empire) Stettiner Maschinebau A.G. Vulcan	66	1882-3	1895/2/7 Sunk in combat Later refloat by Japan as Dai Nijyuroku Gō; 1908/4/1 Stricken	
Chien Wei (建威)		Training ship	Unknown	340	Unknown (as Prussian Mattadore, purchased 1870)	Unknown	
Min Chien (敏捷)		Training ship	Unknown	700	Unknown (as British vessel, purchased 1886)	1893/11/21 Captured by Japan as Binshō; 1909 Sold	
Tau Hai (導海)		Dredger	(German Empire) Stettiner Maschinebau A.G. Vulcan	500	1883	1890s Captured by Japan; Later fate unknown	
Yung Pao (永保)	Yung Pao-class	Transport	(Qing dynasty) Fujian Maritime Administration	1258	1873	1874/9/29 Sunk in storm	
Hai Ching (海鏡)	Yung Pao-class	Transport	(Qing dynasty) Fujian Maritime Administration	1258	1873	1890s Captured by Japan	
Chen Hang (琛航)	Yung Pao-class	Transport	(Qing dynasty) Fujian Maritime Administration	1258 or 1450	1874	1884/8/23 Sunk during Battle of Fuzhou; 1930 Stricken	
Tai Ya (大雅)	Yung Pao-class	Transport	(Qing dynasty) Fujian Maritime Administration	1258	1874	1884/8/23 Sunk during Battle of Fuzhou	
Tai An (泰安) (Note: Originally planned to be sister ship of Teng Ying Chow)	Wei Yuen-class, or Fu Po-class	Transport	(Qing dynasty) Fujian Maritime Administration	1258	1876	1892 Sold to commercial use 1915 Stricken	
Kang Chi (康濟) later Fu Chi (復濟)	Wei Yuen-class	Training ship	(Qing dynasty) Fujian Maritime Administration	1209	1879	1910 Stricken	
Li Yun (利運)		Transport	Unknown	1080	Unknown (as commercial ship, purchased 1888)	Unknown	
Hai Chi (海圻)	Hai Chi-class	Armoured Cruiser	(United Kingdom) Armstrong Elswick Shipyard	4300	1898	1937/8/11 or 1937/8/12 Scuttled as blockship	
Hai Tien (海天)	Hai Chi-class	Armoured Cruiser	(United Kingdom) Armstrong Elswick Shipyard	4300	1897	1904/4/25 Sunk in accident	
Hai Yung (海容)	Hai Yung-class cruiser	Armoured Cruiser	(German Empire) Stettiner Maschinebau A.G. Vulcan	2950 or 2954 or 3000	1897	1937/8/11 or 1937/9/25 Scuttled as blockship	
Hai Shew (海籌)	Hai Yung-class cruiser	Armoured Cruiser	(German Empire) Stettiner Maschinebau A.G. Vulcan	2950 or 2954 or 3000	1897	1937/8/11 or 1937/9/25 Scuttled as blockship	
Hai Chen (海琛)	Hai Yung-class cruiser	Armoured Cruiser	(German Empire) Stettiner Maschinebau A.G. Vulcan	2950 or 2954 or 3000	1898	1937/8/11 or 1937/9/25 Scuttled as blockship	
Chao Ho (肇和)	Chao Ho-class	Armoured Cruiser	(United Kingdom) Armstrong Elswick Shipyard	2460	1911	1937/9/21 or 1939/9/28 Sunk by Japanese aircraft near Humen	
Ying Swei (應瑞)	Chao Ho-class	Armoured Cruiser	(United Kingdom) Vickers Shipyard	2460	1911	1937/10/23 or 1937/10/25 Sunk by Japanese aircraft near Nanjing	
Fei Hung (飛鴻)	Chao Ho-class	Armoured Cruiser	(United States) New York Shipping Company	2600	1912	1914 Sold to Greece as Elli; 1940/8/15 Sunk by Italian submarine Delfino	
Chiang Yuan (江元)	Chiang Yuan-class (Note: Based on the Japanese gunboat Uji)	Gunboat	(Empire of Japan) Kawasaki Shipbuilding Corporation	525 or 550 or 565	1904 or 1905 or 1906-7	1949/12/31 Scuttled after accident? 1949 To Communist China; 1963 Stricken	
Chiang Hung (江亨)	Chiang Yuan-class	Gunboat	(Empire of Japan) Kawasaki Shipbuilding Corporation	525 or 550 or 565	1907	1929/10/12 Sunk by Soviet vessels during Battle of Tongjiang; Later refloated 1931/9/8 Wrecked? 1937/9 Captured by Japan?	
Chiang Li (江利)	Chiang Yuan-class	Gunboat	(Empire of Japan) Kawasaki Shipbuilding Corporation	525 or 550 or 565	1907	1937/9 Captured by Japan? or 1937/9/26 or 1937/12/18 Scuttled as blockship	
Chiang Chen (江貞)	Chiang Yuan-class	Gunboat	(Empire of Japan) Kawasaki Shipbuilding Corporation	525 or 550 or 565	1907	1938/7/20 Sunk by Japanese aircraft near Hunnan; 1938/11/15 Salvaged and seized by Japan	
Chu Tai (楚泰)	Chu-class (Note: An improvement of the Chiang Yuan-class)	Gunboat	(Empire of Japan) Kawasaki Shipbuilding Corporation	740 or 752	1906	1938/6/1 Sunk by Japanese aircraft? 1939 Badly damaged by Japanese aircraft 1939/6/1 Beached; 1941/4/19 Destroyed by Japanese aircraft	
Chu Tong (楚同)	Chu-class	Gunboat	(Empire of Japan) Kawasaki Shipbuilding Corporation	740 or 752	1906	1949 To Communist China; Later sunk by Nationalist aircraft Later refloated by Communist China as Yi Chuan (宜川); 1958-62 Dismantled during the backyard furnace campaign	
Chu You (楚有)	Chu-class	Gunboat	(Empire of Japan) Kawasaki Shipbuilding Corporation	740 or 752	1906 or 1907	1937/8 or 1937/10/1 or 1937/10/2 Sunk by Japanese aircraft	
Chu Chien (楚謙)	Chu-class	Gunboat	(Empire of Japan) Kawasaki Shipbuilding Corporation	740 or 752	1907	1937/7/31 or 1937/8/11 Scuttled as blockship 1948-9 Stricken	
Chu Yu (楚豫)	Chu-class	Gunboat	(Empire of Japan) Kawasaki Shipbuilding Corporation	740 or 745 or 752	1907	1937/9/29 or 1937/10/2 Sunk by Japanese aircraft? Later raised? 1937/12/18 Scuttled as blockship?	
Chu Kuan (楚觀)	Chu-class	Gunboat	(Empire of Japan) Kawasaki Shipbuilding Corporation	740 or 752	1907	1955/12/31 or 1960s Stricken	
Kiang Hsi (江犀) formerly as Hsin Pei (新壁)	Kiang Hsi-class (Note: Based on the German gunboat Otter)	Gunboat	(German Empire) Krupp Germania	140 or 150	1911	1937 Captured by Japan? 1941/8/24 Sunk by Japanese aircraft	
Kiang Kun (江鯤) formerly as Hsin Chen (新珍)	Kiang Hsi-class (Note: Based on the German gunboat Otter)	Gunboat	(German Empire) Stettiner Maschinebau A.G. Vulcan	140 or 150	1911 or 1912	1937 Captured by Japan? 1941/8/24 Sunk by Japanese aircraft	
Chien Chung (建中) formerly as Hsin Min (新敏)	Chien Chung-class (Note: An improvement of Kiang Hsi)	Gunboat	(Republic of China (1912–1949)) Yangtze Machinery Works	90	1912 or 1915	1928/5 Dismantled	
Yung An (永安) formerly as Hsin Tie (新逖)	Chien Chung-class	Gunboat	(Republic of China (1912–1949)) Yangtze Machinery Works	90	1912 or 1916	1928/5 Dismantled	
Kung Chen (拱辰) formerly as Hsin Chan (新瞻)	Chien Chung-class	Gunboat	(Republic of China (1912–1949)) Yangtze Machinery Works	90	1912 or 1916	1928/5 Dismantled? 1938/10 Sunk by Japanese aircraft?	
Kiang Ta (江大)	Kiang Ta-class	Gunboat	(British Hong Kong) Unknown Hong Kong dockyard or (Qing dynasty) Unknown Hankow dockyard	250	1908	1937/9/26 Sunk by Japanese aircraft near Pearl River	
Kiang Han (江漢) formerly as Kiang Ching (江清)	Kiang Ta-class	Gunboat	(British Hong Kong) Unknown Hong Kong dockyard or (Qing dynasty) Unknown Hankow dockyard	250	1908	Unknown	
Kiang Kung (江鞏)	Kiang Ta-class	Gunboat	(British Hong Kong) Unknown Hong Kong dockyard or (Qing dynasty) Unknown Hankow dockyard	250	1908	1938/10/25 Sunk by Japanese aircraft near Panyu	
Kiang Ku (江固)	Kiang Ta-class	Gunboat	(British Hong Kong) Unknown Hong Kong dockyard or (Qing dynasty) Unknown Hankow dockyard	250	1908	Unknown	
Yung Feng (永豐) later Zhong Shan (中山)	Yung Feng-class	Gunboat	(Empire of Japan) Mitsubishi Shipbuilding Nagasaki Dockyard	780 or 830	1912	1938/10/24 Sunk by Japanese aircraft 1997/1/28 Recovered, later restored as museum boat	
Yung Hsiang (永翔)	Yung Feng-class	Gunboat	(Empire of Japan) Kawasaki Shipbuilding Corporation	780 or 830	1912	1937/8 or 1937/9/26 or 1937/12/18 Scuttled as blockship Later refloated by Japan; 1942 Given to Reorganized National Government as Hai Hsiang (海祥); 1945 Returned to Republic of China as Yung Hsiang; 1953/8/16 Stricken	
Yung Chi (永績)	Yung Chi-class (Note: Sometimes classified as Yung Feng-class)	Gunboat	(Republic of China (1912–1949)) Jiangnan Shipyard	860	1915 or 1918	1938/10/21 Sunk by Japanese aircraft 1938/11/8 Captured by Japan (as Asuga?); 1940/5/22 Given to Reorganized National Government as Hai Hsing (海興); 1945/9 Returned to Republic of China as Yung Chi; 1949/4/25 Sunk by Communist China? 1949 Defected to Communist China as Yan'an (延安); 1960/6/19 Sunk during missile tests c. 1970 Stricken	
Yung Chien (永健)	Yung Chi-class	Gunboat	(Republic of China (1912–1949)) Jiangnan Shipyard	860	1915 or 1917	1937/8/25 Sunk by Japanese aircraft Later refloated by Japan; 1937/10/25 or 1937/11 Renamed Asuka; 1945/5/7 Sunk by American aircraft Possibly refloated?	
Kuan Chuan (甘泉)		Gunboat	(Qing dynasty) Jiangnan Shipyard	305	1908	1929 Stricken	
An Hai (安海)	An Hai-class	Gunboat	(Qing dynasty) Fujian Maritime Administration	65	1901	Unknown	
Ting Hai (定海)	An Hai-class	Gunboat	(Qing dynasty) Fujian Maritime Administration	65	1902	Unknown	
An Feng (安豐)		Gunboat	(Qing dynasty) Jiangnan Shipyard	169	1908	Unknown	
Chen Hai (澄海)		Gunboat	(Qing dynasty) Jiangnan Shipyard	120	1911	Unknown	
Chen (辰) or T.B. 2	Chen-class (Note: Based on the Austro-Hungarian torpedo boat Sperber)	Torpedo boat	(German Empire) Stettiner Maschinebau A.G. Vulcan	90 or 120	1895	1937/8/11 Scuttled as blockship	
Su (宿) or T.B. 4	Chen-class	Torpedo boat	(German Empire) Stettiner Maschinebau A.G. Vulcan	90 or 120	1895	1937/8/11 Scuttled as blockship	
Lieh (列)	Lieh-class (Note: Based on the Austro-Hungarian torpedo boat SMS Rabe)	Torpedo boat	(German Empire) Elbing Schichau	62 or 89 or 90	1895	1931 Stricken? 1937/8 Scuttled as blockship	
Chang (張)	Lieh-class	Torpedo boat	(German Empire) Elbing Schichau	62 or 89 or 90	1895	1929 Stricken? 1937/8 Scuttled as blockship	
Fei Ting (飛霆)		Torpedo boat	(United Kingdom) J. Samuel White and Company (United Kingdom) Armstrong Elswick Shipyard	349-401	1890 (as Sea Serpent)	1895 Delivered to China; 1900/6/17 Captured by Russia; 1902/12/19 Returned to China; 1913 Sold as civil vessel Kung Ting (公霆)	
Fei Ying (飛鷹)		Torpedo gunboat	(German Empire) Stettiner Maschinebau A.G. Vulcan	837	1895	1926 Engines removed? 1932/7/6 Sunk by Nationalist aircraft 1932 Stricken	
Hai Lung (海龍)	Hai Lung-class	Destroyer	(German Empire) Elbing Schichau	280	1898	1900/6/17 Captured by Great Britain; Later renamed Taku; 1916/10/26 Stricken	
Hai Ching (海青)	Hai Lung-class	Destroyer	(German Empire) Elbing Schichau	280	1898	1900/6/17 Captured by Great Britain; Later given to Germany as Taku; 1914/6/13 Stricken	
Hai Hua (海華)	Hai Lung-class	Destroyer	(German Empire) Elbing Schichau	280	1898	1900/6/17 Captured by Great Britain; Later given to Russia as Taku, since 1901/1/27 Lieutenant Burakov; 1904/7/26 Sunk in combat	
Hai Hse (海犀)	Hai Lung-class	Destroyer	(German Empire) Elbing Schichau	280	1898	1900/6/17 Captured by Great Britain; Later given to France as Takou; 1911/9/30 Scuttled	
Hu Peng (湖鵬) or T.B. 7	Hu Peng-class (Note: Based on Japanese Type 67 TBD)	Torpedo boat	(Empire of Japan) Kawasaki Shipbuilding Corporation	96 or 97	1906 or 1907-8	1937/10/1 Sunk; 1937/10/2 Abandoned after badly damaged	
Hu Oah (湖鶚) or T.B. 8	Hu Peng-class	Torpedo boat	(Empire of Japan) Kawasaki Shipbuilding Corporation	96 or 97	1906 or 1907-8	1937/10/8 Abandoned after badly damaged 1938 Captured by Japan as A1; 1938/6/15 Renamed Kawasemi; 1938/12/31 Given to Reorganized National Government as Hai Ching (海靖); 1945 Returned to Republic of China, mistakenly named Hu Ying; 1947/7 Stricken	
Hu Ying (湖鷹) or T.B. 9	Hu Peng-class	Torpedo boat	(Empire of Japan) Kawasaki Shipbuilding Corporation	96 or 97	1906 or 1907	1937/8/8 or 1938/8/9 Sunk by Japanese aircraft	
Hu Shun (湖隼) or T.B. 10	Hu Peng-class	Torpedo boat	(Empire of Japan) Kawasaki Shipbuilding Corporation	96 or 97	1906 or 1907	1937/10/3 Sunk by Japanese aircraft	
Chien An (建安)	Chien An-class (Note: Based on French d'Iberville-class torpedo boats)	Torpedo boat	(Qing dynasty) Fujian Maritime Administration	830-861 or 871 or 900	1899 or 1900	1930/11 Refitted and renamed Ta Tong (大同); 1937/8/11 Scuttled as blockship	
Chien Wei (建威)	Chien An-class	Torpedo gunboat	(Qing dynasty) Fujian Maritime Administration	830-861 or 871 or 900	1899 or 1900-1902	1931/6/15 Refitted and renamed Tze Chiang (自強); 1937/8/11 Scuttled as blockship	
Yu Chang (豫章) formerly Chang Feng (長風)	Chang Feng-class destroyer	Destroyer	(German Empire) Elbing Schichau	390	1911	1932/1/21 Sunk in accident	
Chien Kang (建康) formerly Ching Po (睛波) formerly Fu Po (伏波)	Chang Feng-class destroyer	Destroyer	(German Empire) Elbing Schichau	390	1912	1937/9/25 Abandoned after badly damaged 1937/9/27 Sunk; 1938 Refloated by Japan as Yamasemi; 1939/12/21 Given to Reorganized National Government as Hai Sui (海綏); 1945 Returned to Republic of China; 1947/7 Stricken	
Tung An (同安) formerly Ch'ing Yuen (慶雲) formerly Fei Yuen (飛雲)	Chang Feng-class destroyer	Destroyer	(German Empire) Elbing Schichau	390	1912	1937/8 or 1937/9/26 or 1937/12/18 Scuttled as blockship Later refloated by Japan; 1939/12/13 Given to Reorganized National Government as T'ung Ch'un (同春); 1944 Abandoned	
Ching Po (鯨波)	(Note: Based on Italian Soldato-class destroyer)	Destroyer	(Kingdom of Italy) Gio Ansaldo	396 or 400	1912	1911 or 1913 Confiscated by Italy as Ascaro; 1930/5/31 Stricken	
Lung Tuan (龍湍)	(Note: Based on Austro-Hungarian Huszár-class destroyer)	Destroyer	(Austria-Hungary) Stabilimento Tecnico Triestino	389.4	1912	1914/8/28 Confiscated by Austria-Hungary as Warasdiner; 1920 Ceded to Italy and scrapped	
An Lan (安瀾) formerly as Kwang Tung (廣東)	An Lan-class	Gunboat	(United Kingdom) William Denny and Brothers	439	1868	1929 Stricken	
Chen Tao (鎮濤) formerly as Shang Tung (山東)	An Lan-class	Gunboat	(United Kingdom) William Denny and Brothers	439	1868	1929 Stricken	
Peng Chao Hai (蓬州海)		Gunboat	(United Kingdom) Unknown London dockyard	600	1869	Later employed on customs duties 1891 Rearmed; 1913 Stricken	
Unknown	Vulcan first class	Gunboat	(Empire of Japan) Unknown Tokyo shipyard	58	1883-4	Unknown	
Unknown	Vulcan first class	Gunboat	(Empire of Japan) Unknown Tokyo shipyard	58	1883-4	Unknown	
Unknown	Vulcan first class	Gunboat	(Empire of Japan) Unknown Tokyo shipyard	58	1883-4	Unknown	
Unknown	Vulcan first class	Gunboat	(Empire of Japan) Unknown Tokyo shipyard	58	1883-4	Unknown	
Unknown	Vulcan first class	Gunboat	Unknown	64	1883-4	Unknown	
Unknown	Vulcan first class	Gunboat	Unknown	64	1883-4	Unknown	
Chen Hai (鎮海)	Chen Hai-class	Gunboat	Unknown	350	1860s	Unknown	
Cheng Qing (澄清)	Chen Hai-class	Gunboat	Unknown	350	1860s	Unknown	
Sui Ching (綏靖)	Chen Hai-class	Gunboat	Unknown	350	1867	1918 Stricken	
Si Chew		Gunboat	Unknown	500	1878	1929 Stricken	
Kuang Ching	Kuang Ching-class	Gunboat	1894?	300	1894	1929 Stricken	
Kuang Pi	Kuang Ching-class	Gunboat	1894?	300	1894	1929 Stricken	
Chien I (建翼)		Torpedo boat	(Qing dynasty) Fujian Maritime Administration	30	1902	Never operational	
No 65	Monfalcone-class, light	Light cruiser	(Austria-Hungary) Cantiere Navale Triestino	1800	1910s	1915 Seized by Italy; 1917/10 Captured by Austria-Hungary; Further fate unknown	
No 66	Monfalcone-class, light	Light cruiser	(Austria-Hungary) Cantiere Navale Triestino	1800	1910s	1915 Seized by Italy; 1917/10 Captured by Austria-Hungary; Further fate unknown	
No 67	Monfalcone-class, light	Light cruiser	(Austria-Hungary) Cantiere Navale Triestino	1800	1910s	1915 Seized by Italy; 1917/10 Captured by Austria-Hungary; Further fate unknown	
No 68	Monfalcone-class, large	Cruiser	(Austria-Hungary) Cantiere Navale Triestino	4900	1910s	1914 Seized by Italy; 1917/10 Captured by Austria-Hungary; Later scrapped	
Tung Chi (通濟) formerly as Chian Ching (建靖)		Training ship	(Qing dynasty) Fujian Maritime Administration	1900	1895	1937/8/11 or 1937/8/12 Scuttled as blockship	
Foo An (福安)	Tung Chi-class	Transport	(Qing dynasty) Fujian Maritime Administration	1700 or 1800-1900	1894 or 1895	1932 Stricken? 1937/8 Scuttled as blockship	
Wu Feng (舞鳳)		Officer ship	(German Empire) Royal Tsingtao Dockyard	200 or 220	1910 or 1912	1937/8/11 Scuttled as blockship? 1937/9 Sunk by Japanese aircraft?	
Lien Ching (聯鯨) later Chi Jih (皦日)		Surveying Vessel formerly officer ship	(Qing dynasty) Jiangnan Shipyard	500	1910	1937/8/26 Sunk by Japanese aircraft or destroyers	
Hai Yan (海燕)		Gunboat	(Republic of China (1912–1949)) Taku Dockyard	56	1917	1937/7/29 Sunk by Japanese aircraft? 1937/7/30 Captured by Japan; Given to Reorganized National Government	
Hai Fu (海鳧)	Hai Fu-class	Gunboat	(Republic of China (1912–1949)) Jiangnan Shipyard	150 or 166	1917	Unknown	
Hai Ou (海鷗)	Hai Fu-class	Gunboat	(Republic of China (1912–1949)) Jiangnan Shipyard	150 or 166	1917	Unknown	
Hai Hung (海鴻)	Hai Hung-class	Gunboat	(Republic of China (1912–1949)) Fujian Maritime Administration	190	1916 or 1917	Unknown	
Hai Ku (海鵠)	Hai Hung-class	Gunboat	(Republic of China (1912–1949)) Fujian Maritime Administration	190	1917 or 1919	Unknown	
Hai Hoo (海鶴)	Hai Ho-class	Gunboat	(Republic of China (1912–1949)) Taku Dockyard	211	1917	c. 1938 Captured by Japan; Given to Reorganized National Government	
Hai Peng (海蓬)	Hai Ho-class	Gunboat	(Republic of China (1912–1949)) Taku Dockyard	211	1920	Unknown	
Li Sui (利綏)	Tsingtau-class	Gunboat	(German Empire) Elbing Schichau	211	1903 (as SMS Vaterland, taken 1917)	1932 Captured by Japan as Risui; 1937 Given to Manchukuo; 1945/8/22 Captured by Soviets as training vessel Pekin; Scrapped in 1950s	
Li Chieh (利捷)		Gunboat	(German Empire) Joh. C. Tecklenborg	266	1909 (as SMS Otter, taken 1917)	1929/10/19 Badly damaged by Soviet aircraft 1932 Scrapped	
Kuai 1 or No 1	MAS (Orlando da 12 Tonn. 2 serie)	Motor torpedo boat	(Kingdom of Italy) Orlando Brothers	16	1918 (as MAS 226, purchased 1921)	1933 Stricken	
Kuai 2 or No 2	MAS (Orlando da 12 Tonn. 2 serie)	Motor torpedo boat	(Kingdom of Italy) Orlando Brothers	16	1918 (as MAS 227, purchased 1921)	1933 Stricken	
Kuang Ting		Torpedo gunboat	Unknown	1030	1891	c. 1914 Stricken	
Hoi Fu		Gunboat	Unknown	680	1904	1937/9 Sunk by Japanese aircraft	
Fu Yu		Gunboat	Unknown	750	1904	1937/10 Sunk by Japanese aircraft	
Wei Sheng (威勝)	Wei Sheng-class	Gunboat	Unknown	932	1922	1937/8/11 Scuttled as blockship	
Teh Sheng (德勝)	Wei Sheng-class	Gunboat	Unknown	932	1922	1937/8/11 Scuttled as blockship	
Yi Sheng (義勝)		Gunboat	Unknown	350	1911	1937 or 1938 Scuttled	
Shun Sheng (順勝)		Gunboat	Unknown	380	1911	1937 or 1938 Scuttled	
We Feng		Gunboat	Unknown	200	1912	Unknown	
Chen Shen or Chen Sheng		Gunboat	Unknown	275	1899	1937 Captured by Japan	
Chien Tien (青天) formerly Kung Sheng (公勝)		Gunboat	Unknown	279	1922	Unknown	
Ning Hai (甯海)	Ning Hai-class	Light Cruiser	(Empire of Japan) Harima	2500	1931	1937/9/23 Sunk by Japanese aircraft Raised and repaired 1939 Given to Reorganized National Government; 1943 Transferred to Japan; 1944 renamed Ioshima; 1944/9/19 Sunk by USS Shad	
Ping Hai (平海)	Ning Hai-class	Light Cruiser	(Republic of China (1912–1949)) Jiangnan Shipyard	2500	1932 or 1935	1937/9/23 Sunk by Japanese aircraft Raised and repaired 1939 Given to Reorganized National Government; 1943 Transferred to Japan; 1944 renamed Yasoshima; 1944/11/25 Sunk by US aircraft	
Unnamed submarine	Type II	Coastal submarine	(Nazi Germany) Flender Werke	275	1940	1939 Taken over by Germany; 1940 Completed as U-121; Later scuttled	
Unnamed submarine	Type II	Coastal submarine	(Nazi Germany) Flender Werke	275	1940	1939 Taken over by Germany; 1940 Completed as U-120; Later scuttled	
Hsien Ning (咸寧)		Gunboat	(Republic of China (1912–1949)) Jiangnan Shipyard	418	1928	1938/7/1 Sunk by Japanese aircraft	
Ming Sen (民生)	Minquan-class	Gunboat	(Republic of China (1912–1949)) Jiangnan Shipyard	460 or 600	1931	1937/10/3 Sunk by Japanese aircraft 1939 Repaired and captured by Japan as Hitonose; 1944/12/21 Lost in collision with Kosho; Salvaged; Sunk by naval mine	
Ming Cheun (民權) later Hsien Ning later Chang Chiang	Minquan-class	Gunboat	(Republic of China (1912–1949)) Jiangnan Shipyard	420 or 460 or 550	1929	1949 To Communist China? Renamed Hsien Ning; Renamed Chang Chiang; Unknown	
Yung Sui (永綏)		Gunboat	(Republic of China (1912–1949)) Jiangnan Shipyard	650	1929	1949/4 Sunk by Communist China; Salvaged by Communist China; 1970s Stricken	
Yat Sen (逸仙)		Light cruiser (Note: Akin to the pre-WW1 light cruisers, but had more in common with gunboats at time of construction)	(Republic of China (1912–1949)) Jiangnan Shipyard	1520 or 1650	1930	1937/9/25 Damaged by Japanese aircraft and beached Salvaged by Japan and renamed Atada; 1945/8 Captured by Allies; 1946/8/25 Returned to China; 1960s Stricken	
Chang Ning (長寧)	Ning-class	Patrol Boat	(Republic of China (1912–1949)) Jiangnan Shipyard	400	1937-8	1937-8 Captured by Japan	
Cheng Ning (正寧)	Ning-class	Patrol Boat	(Republic of China (1912–1949)) Jiangnan Shipyard	400	1937-8	1937-8 Captured by Japan	
Chung Ning (崇寧)	Ning-class	Patrol Boat	(Republic of China (1912–1949)) Jiangnan Shipyard	300 or 400	1937-8	1937-8 Captured by Japan	
Kiang Ning (江寧)	Ning-class	Patrol Boat	(Republic of China (1912–1949)) Jiangnan Shipyard	300 or 400	1933 or 1937-8	1937-8 Captured by Japan	
Wei Ning (威寧)	Ning-class	Patrol Boat	(Republic of China (1912–1949)) Jiangnan Shipyard	300 or 400	1937-8	1937-8 Captured by Japan as Bunsei; 1945 Recaptured by China; 1949 Sunk; Salvaged by Communist China; 1950s Stricken	
Yun Ning	Ning-class	Patrol Boat	(Republic of China (1912–1949)) Jiangnan Shipyard	400	1937-8	1937-8 Captured by Japan as Unsei	
Fu Ning (撫寧)	Ning-class	Patrol Boat	(Republic of China (1912–1949)) Jiangnan Shipyard	400	1937-8	1937-8 Scuttled	
Hai Ning (海寧)	Ning-class	Patrol Boat	(Republic of China (1912–1949)) Jiangnan Shipyard	300 or 400	1933 or 1937-8	1937-8 Scuttled	
Sui Ning (綏寧)	Ning-class	Patrol Boat	(Republic of China (1912–1949)) Jiangnan Shipyard	300 or 400	1937-8	1937-8 Scuttled	
Suh Ning (肅寧)	Ning-class	Patrol Boat	(Republic of China (1912–1949)) Jiangnan Shipyard	300 or 400	1937-8	1937-8 Scuttled	
Tai Ning	Ning-class	Patrol Boat	(Republic of China (1912–1949)) Jiangnan Shipyard	400	1937-8	1937-8 Scuttled	
Wu Ning	Ning-class?	Patrol Boat	(Republic of China (1912–1949)) Jiangnan Shipyard	300	1930s	1930s Destroyed?	
Yi Ning (義寧)	Ning-class?	Patrol Boat	(Republic of China (1912–1949)) Jiangnan Shipyard	300	1930s	Unknown	
Tung Hsin (同心)		Minelayer	(Republic of China (1912–1949)) Foochow Arsenal	500	1935	1937 Captured by Japan	
Tung Teh (同德)		Minelayer	(Republic of China (1912–1949)) Foochow Arsenal	500	1935	1937 Captured by Japan	
Yung Sheng (勇勝)		Gunboat	Unknown	300	1928	c. 1937 Scuttled	
Jen Shen or Jen Sheng		Gunboat	Unknown	300	1931	c. 1937 Scuttled	
Fu Po	Flower-class	Corvette	(United Kingdom) Robb	1170	1940 (as HMS Petunia, purchased 1945)	1947/3/19 Lost in collision	
Ying Shan (英山)	Peterel-class	Gunboat	(United Kingdom) Yarrow	310	1927 (as HMS Gannet, transferred 1942)	1949 To Communist China; 1960s Stricken	
Ying Hao (英豪)		Gunboat	(United Kingdom) Thornycroft	185	1933 (as HMS Sandpiper, transferred 1942)	1949/4 Scuttled? 1949 To Communist China; 1960s Stricken	
Lung Huan later Ying Teh (英德)		Gunboat	(United Kingdom) Yarrow	354 or 372	1931 (as HMS Falcon, transferred 1942)	1949 To Communist China; 1960s Stricken	
Mei Yuan (美原)	Wake-class	Gunboat	(Republic of China (1912–1949)) Jiangnan Shipyard	370	1927 (as USS Tutuila, transferred 1942)	1949 To Communist China; 1960s Stricken	
Kuai 1		Motor torpedo boat	(United Kingdom) Thornycroft or (British Hong Kong) Unknown Hong Kong dockyard	14	1934	1938 Interned in Hong Kong; 1939 Purchased by UK as MTB26; 1941 Lost	
Kuai 2		Motor torpedo boat	(United Kingdom) Thornycroft or (British Hong Kong) Unknown Hong Kong dockyard	14	1934	1938 Interned in Hong Kong; 1939 Purchased by UK as MTB27; 1941 Lost	
Kuai 3		Motor torpedo boat	(Kingdom of Italy) Baglietto	18	1931	1937-8 Lost?	
Kuai 4		Motor torpedo boat	(Kingdom of Italy) Baglietto	18	1931	1937-8 Lost?	
Kuai 5		Motor torpedo boat	(United Kingdom) Thornycroft	14	1936	1937-8 Lost?	
Kuai 6		Motor torpedo boat	(United Kingdom) Thornycroft	14	1936	1937-8 Lost?	
Kuai 7		Motor torpedo boat	(United Kingdom) Thornycroft	14	1936	1937-8 Lost?	
Kuai 8		Motor torpedo boat	(United Kingdom) Thornycroft	14	1936	1937-8 Lost?	
Kuai 101		Motor torpedo boat	(Nazi Germany) Lürssen	49	1937	1937-8 Lost?	
Kuai 102		Motor torpedo boat	(Nazi Germany) Lürssen	49 or 60	1937	1949 To Communist China; 1960s Stricken	
Kuai 103		Motor torpedo boat	(Nazi Germany) Lürssen	49	1937	1937-8 Lost?	
Unnamed depot ship		Depot ship	(Nazi Germany) Neptun	2190	1937	1937 Purchase cancelled by Germany; 1938 Completed as Tanga; 1947 Transferred to USA; 1948 Transferred to Denmark as Aegir; 1967 Scrapped	
Unnamed S-boat	Schnellboot	Fast attack craft	(Nazi Germany) Lürssen	46.5	1932 (as S2)	1937 Purchase cancelled by Germany; 1938 Transferred to Spain as LT11	
Unnamed S-boat	Schnellboot	Fast attack craft	(Nazi Germany) Lürssen	46.5	1932 (as S3)	1937 Purchase cancelled by Germany; 1938 Transferred to Spain as LT12	
Unnamed S-boat	Schnellboot	Fast attack craft	(Nazi Germany) Lürssen	46.5	1932 (as S4)	1937 Purchase cancelled by Germany; 1938 Transferred to Spain as LT14	
Unnamed S-boat	Schnellboot	Fast attack craft	(Nazi Germany) Lürssen	46.5	1932 (as S5)	1937 Purchase cancelled by Germany; 1938 Transferred to Spain as LT15	
Kung Sheng (公勝) formerly as Chin Tien (青天)		Surveying Vessel	Unknown	300	1911 or 1931	1930s Destroyed?	
Kan Lu (甘露)		Surveying Vessel	(United Kingdom) Leith	2132	1903 (as Lorena, later Atalanta)	Unknown	
Ching An		Transport	Unknown	4000	1906	Unknown	
Ting An (定安)		Transport	Unknown	2011	1901	Unknown	
Hwa An (華安?)		Transport	Unknown	10573	1899	Unknown	
Pu An (普安)		Transport	Unknown	4600	1896	Unknown	
Hai Chao		Sloop	Unknown	Unknown	Unknown	Unknown	
Unnamed depot ship		Depot ship	(British Hong Kong) Unknown Hong Kong dockyard	1500	1940s	Unknown	
Kieh An (克安)		Transport	Unknown	2011	1901	Unknown	
Hai Chow (海周)	Arabis-class	Gunboat	(United Kingdom) Workman, Clark & Co.	1250	1916 (as HMS Pentstemon)	Formerly as Hai Li, Lila, Noemi and Stiges; 1930s Destroyed?	
Cheng Po (澄波)		Unknown	(France) Unknown French dockyard	Unknown	Unknown (Purchased 1869)	Unknown	
Hai Tung Yun (海東雲)		Unknown	Unknown	Unknown	Unknown (Purchased 1869)	Unknown	
An Lan (安瀾)		Experimental, steamboat	(Qing dynasty) Fujian Maritime Administration	Unknown	1868	Unknown	
Wei Yuen (威遠)		Unknown	(France) Unknown French dockyard	Unknown	Unknown (Purchased 1875)	Unknown	
Kao Sheng (高升)		Transport, merchant	Unknown	Unknown	Unknown	1894 Sunk by Japan	
Fu An (gunboat) (福安)		Unknown	(United Kingdom) Armstrong Elswick Shipyard	Unknown	Unknown (Purchased 1894)	Unknown	
Confucius (孔夫子) later Tien Ping (天平)		Gunboat	Unknown	430	Unknown (as American merchant Confucius, purchased 1855)	Unknown	
Tieh Pi (鐵皮) later Chun Ho (鈞和)		Gunboat	Unknown	354	Unknown (as Pu Lu (普魯), purchased 1856)	Unknown	
Wei Lin Mi (威林密)		Gunboat	Unknown	Unknown	Unknown (Purchased 1862)	1862 Sold	
O Fen (呃吩)		Transport	Unknown	Unknown	Unknown (Confiscated 1863)	Unknown	
Hyson (海生) later Ching Po (靜波)		Gunboat	Unknown	Unknown	Unknown (Purchased 1865)	1877 Sold	
Fu Po (伏波)		Transport	Unknown	Unknown	Unknown (Purchased 1865)	Sold	
Chang Sheng (長勝)		Transport	Unknown	Unknown	Unknown (Purchased 1865)	Unknown	
Ching Hai (靖海)		Transport	Unknown	Unknown	Unknown (As private vessel Ku Tung (古董), confiscated 1865)	Unknown	
Fu Yuan (福源)		Transport	Unknown	Unknown	Unknown (Purchased 1866)	Unknown	
Hua Fu Pao (華福寶)		Transport	Unknown	Unknown	Unknown (Purchased 1866)	Unknown	
Fu Sheng (福勝)		Unknown	Unknown	Unknown	Unknown (Purchased 1860s)	1866 Destroyed in storm	
Fei Lung (飛龍)		Transport	Unknown	Unknown	Unknown (Purchased c. 1867)	Unknown	
Chen Hai (鎮海)		Transport	Unknown	Unknown	Unknown (Purchased c. 1867)	Unknown	
Cheng Ching (澄清)		Transport	Unknown	Unknown	Unknown (Purchased c. 1867)	Unknown	
Sui Ching (綏靖)		Transport	Unknown	Unknown	Unknown (Purchased c. 1867)	Unknown	
Tien Po (恬波) later Ching Po (靜波)		Transport	Unknown	Unknown	Unknown (Purchased c. 1868)	1882 Sold	
An Lan (安瀾)		Transport	Unknown	Unknown	Unknown (Purchased c. 1868)	Unknown	
Chan Tao (鎮濤)		Transport	Unknown	Unknown	Unknown (Purchased c. 1868)	Unknown	
