= Hai Yung =

Hai Yung may refer to:

- Chinese cruiser Hai Yung, a protected cruiser in the Chinese fleet
- Hai Yung class cruiser, a class of protected cruisers
