= Minquan =

Minquan may refer to:

- Principle of Minquan, one of the Three Principles of the People
- Minquan County, in Henan, China
- Minquan Subdistrict, Henan
- Minquan Subdistrict, Hubei
- Minquan-class gunboat - A class of early 20th century gunboats
  - Chinese gunboat Minquan

== See also ==
- Minquan West Road
  - Minquan West Road metro station
