= Ragged Point =

Ragged Point may refer to:

- Ragged Point, Barbados, a village in Saint Philip Parish in Barbados
- Ragged Point (California), a cape along the Big Sur coast in San Luis Obispo County, California
- Ragged Point Beach, Virginia, an unincorporated community in Westmoreland County, in the U. S. state of Virginia
- Ragged Point Light, a former screw-pile lighthouse located in the Potomac River on the eastern coast of the United States
- Ragged Point, a fishing community within Bayview, part of the town of Twillingate in the province of Newfoundland and Labrador, Canada
