= Hu Peng-class torpedo boat =

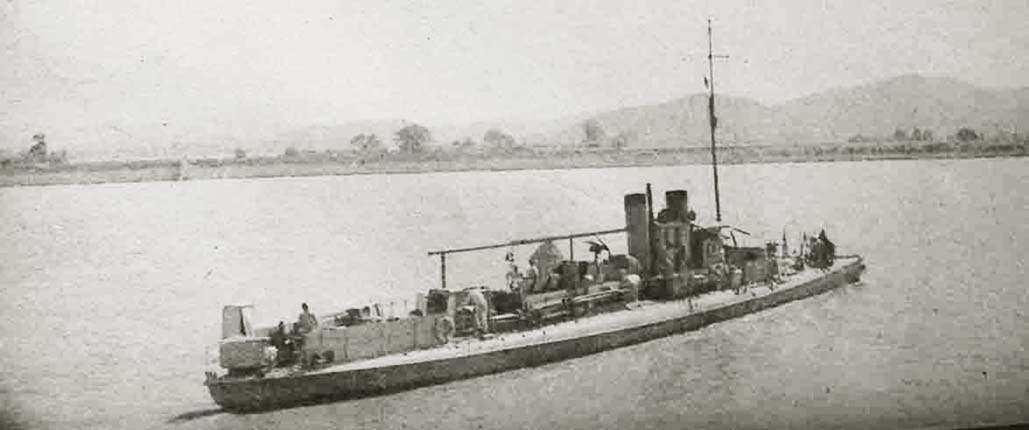
- Hu Oah at anchor, c. 1907–47, location unknown

Class overview
- Name: Hu Peng class
- Builders: Kawasaki Dockyard Company, Ltd., Kobe, Empire of Japan
- Operators: Imperial Chinese Navy; Republic of China Navy; Royal Thai Navy; Imperial Japanese Navy; Republic of China-Nanjing Navy
- Preceded by: Lieh class (ICN); HTMS Moradoph (RTN)
- Succeeded by: Type 02 (PLAN); Trad class (RTN)
- Subclasses: Number 1-class
- Cost: ¥380,000
- Built: 1906–1912
- In service: 1906-1947
- Planned: 8
- Completed: 8
- Lost: 4
- Retired: 4

General characteristics
- Type: Torpedo boat
- Displacement: 89 long tons (90 t)-97 long tons (99 t) (standard); 100 long tons (102 t)-120 long tons (122 t) (full load)
- Length: 41.1 m (134 ft 10 in) o/a
- Beam: 4.9 m (16 ft 1 in)
- Draught: 2.1 m (6 ft 11 in)
- Propulsion: 1 shaft, 1 VTE engine, 2-Kampon boilers, 1,200 bhp (900 kW)
- Speed: 23 knots (26 mph; 43 km/h)
- Complement: 24-34
- Armament: Hu Peng: 2 × 47 mm (2 in)/40 (2 × 1); 1 × 6.5 mm (0 in)/115 (1 × 1); 3 × 450 mm (18 in) torpedo tubes (3 × 1); Number 1: 1 × 57 mm (2 in)/40 (1 × 1); 1 × 47 mm (2 in)/40 (1 × 1); 2 × 450 mm (18 in) torpedo tubes (2 × 1)

The Hu Peng class (Chinese: 湖鵬; pinyin: Húpéng), also known as the Hu class, Type N and Number 1 class (Thai: หมายเลข 1) was a class of torpedo boat built initially for the Qing Imperial Chinese Navy from 1906 to 1907. The ships would eventually pass to the Republic of China Navy and would serve during the National Protection War, World War I, the Second Zhili–Fengtian War, Northern Expedition and Second Sino-Japanese War. A near identical, semi-sister class of torpedo boats were built for the Royal Thai Navy from 1907 to 1912.

== Background ==
After most of the Imperial Chinese Navy was destroyed in the First Sino-Japanese War, the Qing government embarked on an international campaign to obtain a loan to rebuild China's navy. After spending two year in Europe and North America, Marquess Suyi, Li Hongzhang returned to China with orders for two cruisers from the United Kingdom and three cruisers and four destroyers from Germany. To supplement this naval rearmament, private donations were made for the purchase of new warships. One such purchase was made by the Governor-General of Hubei, Zhang Zhidong (mistranslated in some sources as 'Vice Admiral Hu Peh', from his title) for four torpedo boats from Japan. The four ships had both numbers and names. These were to be named Torpedo boat No.7/Hu Peng (Chinese: 湖鵬; pinyin: Húpéng; lit. 'Lake Peng'), Torpedo boat No.8/Hu Oah (or in some sources Hu Ngo) (Chinese: 湖鶚; pinyin: Húè; lit. 'Lake Osprey'), Torpedo boat No.9/Hu Ying (Chinese: 湖鷹; pinyin: Húyīng; lit. 'Lake Hawk') and Torpedo boat No.10/Hu Chung (Chinese: 湖隼; pinyin: Húsǔn; lit. 'Lake Falcon'). All ships spelled with the Chinese character 湖 (pinyin: Hú), a nod to his Governor-Generalship of Hubei (Chinese: 湖北; pinyin: Húběi) which also contains the same character.

In 1907, Prince Paribatra Sukhumbandhu, ordered a destroyer based on the Harusame-class destroyer, HTMS Thayanchon (Thai: เรือหลวงทยานชล), and three Normand-type torpedo boats from Kawasaki for the Royal Thai Navy, but with oil-fired boilers rather than coal-fired. The initial ships were named numerically, as the Number 1 (Thai: หมายเลข 1), Number 2 (Thai: หมายเลข 2), and Number 3 (Thai: หมายเลข 3). In 1910, under the new King Rama VI, Prince Paribatra's began a 16-year plan to strengthen the Siamese Navy, starting with ordering a fourth torpedo boat, from Kawasaki to be named Number 4 (Thai: หมายเลข 4) in 1911 along with another destroyer based on the Harusame class.

== Design ==
The Hu Peng-class ships were based on the Kawasaki Dockyard Company, Ltd. experience building the Hayabusa-class torpedo boats between 1903 and 1904. The ships were built on a French steel-hull Normand-type and designed for coastal service with a low freeboard. The ships were 41.1 m (134 ft 10 in) long overall, and with a draught of 2.1 m (6 ft 11 in). This shallow draught allowed the torpedo boats to operate on deep rivers such as the Yangtze as well as coastal operations. The ships initial armament were two single Japanese license-built 2½-pounder Yamanouchi Mk I guns, fore and aft. The torpedo armament consisted of three single 450 mm (18 in) torpedo tubes; two single, above-water, centre-line torpedo launchers and one fixed, underwater torpedo tube at the bow. The ships were propelled by a single shaft propeller, with one vertical triple expansion engine, powered by two Kampon boilers, making a total of 1,200 bhp (900 kW) with a top speed of 23 knots (26 mph; 43 km/h). The ship could carry 28 long tons (28 t) of coal.

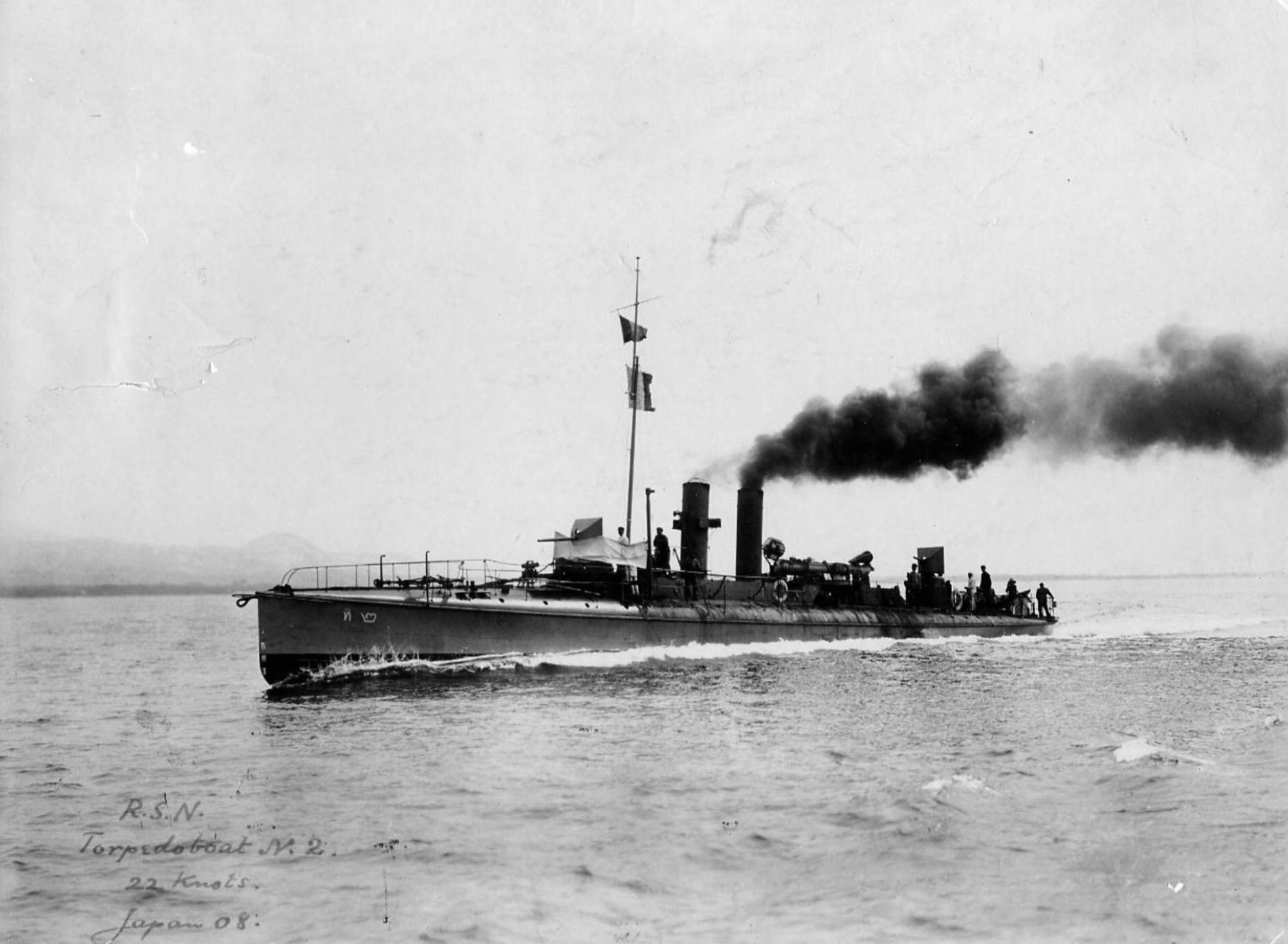
Royal Siamese Torpedo boat No.2 off Japan in 1908

The Thai Number 1 subclass, while physically identical in dimensions to the Hu Peng ships, but carried 19 long tons (19 t) of oil instead of coal, lightening the total displacement by roughly 10 long tons (10 t). The other difference was in armament, with one 47 mm QF 3-pounder Hotchkiss gun being replaced by a 57 mm QF 6-pounder Hotchkiss gun. The bow mounted torpedo tube was removed and the two single 450 mm (18 in) centre-line launchers were retained. Like the Hu Peng class, the Siamese ships were designed for coastal and riverine use, such as the Mekong.

== Service history ==
The Chinese Hu Peng-class ships initially served directly under Viceroyalty of Hubei on the Yangtze River and continued to do so into the Republican period. By 1933 the four ships had been reassigned to the ROCN Torpedo Boat Squadron along with the Chien Kang (建康), the two older Chen-class torpedo boats and the gunboat Yao Shu on the Yangtze. All your ships would serve in the Second Sino-Japanese War, and sustain heavy damage, with the loss of three of four of the ships to aerial bombardment. Hu Oah would be raise by the Japanese in 1938, and survived the war in Shanghai while Hu Chung would limp back with last elements of the ROCN in Chongqing would survive until 1945.

== Ships ==
Name	Builder	Laid down	Launched	Completed	Notes	Fate
Hu Peng-subclass
Hu Peng (湖鵬) pinyin: Húpéng; Torpedo Boat No.7	Kawasaki Dockyard Co.	February 1906	10 June 1906	1906	Sunk by aircraft at the Battle of Shanghai on 1 October 1937.	Abandoned 2 October 1937 due to heavy damage.
Hu Oah (湖鶚) pinyin: Húè; Torpedo Boat No.8	Kawasaki Dockyard Co.	February 1906	10 June 1906	1906	Sunk by aircraft at the Battle of Shanghai on 8 October 1937. 1938 refloated by Japan, commissioned as A1 and later Kawasemi (川蝉). 31 December 1938, transferred to the Reorganized National Government of the Republic of China under the name Hai Ching (海靖). 1945 Returned to Republic of China, mistakenly named Hu Ying (湖鷹).	Stricken July 1947.
Hu Ying (湖鷹) pinyin: Húyīng; Torpedo Boat No.9	Kawasaki Dockyard Co.	May 1906	17 November 1906	1907		Sunk by aircraft at the Battle of Wuhan on 9 August 1938.
Hu Chung (湖隼) pinyin: Húsǔn; Torpedo Boat No.10	Ateliers et Chantiers de la Loire	May 1906	17 November 1906	1907	Retreated from the Battle of Shanghai 12 November 1938 to Chongqing for repairs.	Fate unknown. Last mentioned in service with the Second Squadron of the ROCN, 1945.
Number 1-subclass
Number 1 Thai: หมายเลข 1	Kawasaki Dockyard Co.	1907	9 May 1908	1908		Stricken April 1933.
Number 2 Thai: หมายเลข 2	Kawasaki Dockyard Co.	1907	9 May 1908	1908		Stricken January 1937.
Number 3 Thai: หมายเลข 3	Kawasaki Dockyard Co.	1907	14 May 1908	1908		Stricken January 1937.
Number 4 Thai: หมายเลข 4	Kawasaki Dockyard Co.	1912	19 April 1913	1913		Stricken September 1937.
