= Willamette =

Willamette (/wɪˈlæmɪt/ wil-AM-it) is an anglicized version of the Chinook term for the Columbia River. It can refer to:

A toponym of the U.S. state of Oregon:

- Willamette River, a tributary of the Columbia River in northwestern Oregon
- Willamette Valley, a region in northwest Oregon that surrounds the Willamette River
  - Willamette Valley AVA, Oregon wine region
  - Willamette Valley (ecoregion), an area that includes the Willamette Valley and adjacent parts of Washington
- Willamette, Oregon, an unincorporated community that is now part of West Linn
- Willamette National Forest, a National Forest in western Oregon
- Willamette Falls, a natural waterfall on the Willamette River between Oregon City and West Linn
- Willamette Meteorite, a meteorite that was discovered in Oregon
- Willamette Pass Resort, a ski area in the Cascade Range of Oregon
- Willamette Stone, survey marker in Oregon
- Willamette Cattle Company, a company formed in Oregon in 1837 to buy cattle in California
- Willamette University, a private institution of higher learning located in Salem
- Willamette Hall, a building on the University of Oregon campus
- Willamette High School, a high school in Eugene
- Willamette Trading Post, a 19th-century fur trading post
- Willamette Riverkeeper, a non-profit organization involved in environmental activism

== Other ==
- Willamette Industries, a former Fortune 500 company purchased by Weyerhauser
- Willamette locomotive, a type of steam locomotive formerly used in the logging and mining industries
- Intel Willamette, the code-name for the first core used in the Intel Pentium 4 microprocessor
- Willamette, Colorado, a fictional setting in the video game Dead Rising
- USS Willamette, several United States Navy ships
- Willamette, American steamer
- Willamette Hops, used in the brewing of beer, see List of hop varieties

== See also ==
- Wilmette, Illinois
