= SS Hsin-Yu =

Chinese Army ship that sank in April 1916

SS Hsin Yu
History
- Owner: Chinese Army
- Launched: 1889
- Fate: Sunk, 22 April 1916

General characteristics
- Type: Transport ship
- Tonnage: 1,629 tons

SS Hsin-Yu
- Chinese: 新裕
- Literal meaning: New Riches
Transcriptions
Standard Mandarin
- Hanyu Pinyin: Xīn Yù
- Wade–Giles: Hsin^{1} Yü^{4}

SS Hsin Yu was a Chinese Army transport ship that served during the Warlord Era. The 1,629-ton ship had been built in 1889. On 22 April 1916, the transport, with over a thousand enlisted men and officers on board, was in a thick fog while on its way to Foo Chow. South of the Chusan Islands, the cruiser Hai Yung accidentally collided with Hsin Yu. A foreign engineer, nine sailors, and 20 soldiers were the only survivors. The ship sank with the loss of more than 1,000 lives. The date of the disaster has frequently (and mistakenly) been listed as 29 August 1916 although it occurred four months earlier.
