= Minquan-class gunboat =

Class of gunboats, Republic of China Navy

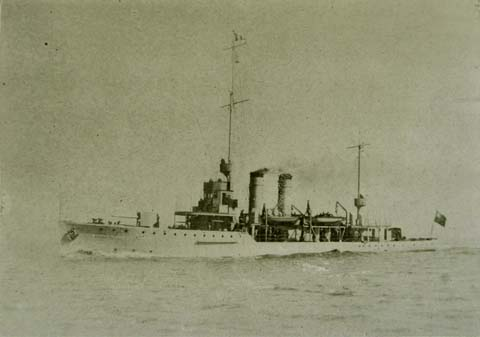
- Chinese gunboat Minquan in sea trial

Class overview
- Name: Minquan class
- Builders: Jiangnan Shipyard, Shanghai, Republic of China
- Operators: Republic of China Navy; Imperial Japanese Navy; People's Liberation Army Navy
- Preceded by: Yongsui
- Succeeded by: none (ROCN); Type 52 (PLAN)
- Subclasses: Minsheng
- Cost: $1,200,000–1,500,000
- Built: 1929–1931
- In service: 1930–1978
- Planned: 2
- Completed: 2
- Lost: 1

General characteristics
- Type: gunboat
- Displacement: 460 long tons (467 t) (standard); 600–650 long tons (610–660 t) (full load)
- Length: 59.9–64 m (196 ft 6 in – 210 ft 0 in) o/a
- Beam: 7.9–8.3 m (25 ft 11 in – 27 ft 3 in)
- Draught: 1.8–2.0 m (5 ft 11 in – 6 ft 7 in)
- Propulsion: 2 shafts, 2 VTE engines, 2 cylindrical boilers, 2,600 bhp (1,900 kW) (Mingquan); 2 shafts, 2 VTE engines, 2 cylindrical boilers, 3,600 bhp (2,700 kW) (Mingsen)
- Speed: 17.5 knots (32.4 km/h; 20.1 mph)-18.5 knots (34.3 km/h; 21.3 mph)
- Complement: 115
- Armament: 1 × 120 mm (5 in)/45 (1 × 1); 1 × 100 mm (4 in)/45 (1 × 1); Various tertiary and anti-aircraft guns

The Minquan class (Chinese: 民權; pinyin: Mínquán) was a class of gunboats originally built for the Republic of China Navy. The class of ships consisted a pair of semi-sister ships and served in the Second Sino-Japanese War and the Chinese Civil War.

== Background ==
The inauguration of Chiang Kai-shek as Chairman of the National Government of China on 10 October 1927 in Nanjing brought about a new era of centralization not seen in China since the Qing Dynasty. This also finally allowed the government to finally reinvest in China's derelict and poorly maintained navy, that had seen decades of infighting and mutinies throughout the previous Warlord Era. After a contract for new gunboats from Mitsubishi in Japan was turned down, on the grounds of the China Arms Embargo Agreement of 1919, the Kuomintang government turned to the domestic Jiangnan Shipyard. The Jiangnan Shipyard had recently successfully completed an order of six river gunboats for the United States Navy and an order, for a 418-ton gunboat based on the previously built American designs was placed with the Shanghai based shipyard. Over the next several years, a steady order of five new gunboats was placed with Jiangnan, as well as many additional navy orders for modifications and refurbishment. The third and fifth of this series of ships were two semi-sister ships called the Minquan (Chinese: 民權; pinyin: Mínquán; Wade–Giles: Ming Chuen; lit. 'People's Rights') and the Minsheng (Chinese: 民生; pinyin: Mínshēng; Wade–Giles: Ming Sen; lit. 'People's Welfare'). These ships were named after two of the Three Principles of the People of Dr. Sun Yat-Sen, the father of the Republic.

== Design ==
The two ships Minquan and Minsheng were based on the 1920s American Yangtze Patrol gunboat designs by Superintending Engineer Robert Buchanan Mauchan of Jiangnan Shipyards. These ships were built by Jiangnan from 1913 to 1928. The new series of Chinese gunboats were designed by the succeeding Superintending engineer. Yi Zaifu (叶在馥), who had helped work on the original US Navy designs and expanded on them. The two ships of the Minquan class were shallow draught gunboats with sea-going capabilities but expressly built for riverine service and designed to be capable of sailing up the Upper Yangtze River, all the way to Chongqing. The first ship of the class, Minquan was laid down 16 January 1929, in the same month as the completion of the gunboat Xianning and the launching of the gunboat Yongsui. Of intermediate size and displacement of the two other gunboats, Minquan had a full displacement of 600 long tons (610 t), an overall length of 59.9 m (196 ft 6 in) and notably a draught of only 1.8 m (5 ft 11 in). The ship was powered by two vertical triple expansion engines, pushing two propellers at 2,600 bhp (1,900 kW) with two cylindrical boilers that were coal fired rather than oil fired like the American gunboats. Minquan was able to reach 17.5 knots (32.4 km/h; 20.1 mph) and carried 280 long tons (284 t) of coal. She was planned to be completed in only eleven months and construction went swiftly, with a launching by 21 September 1929 and completion on New Year's Day, 1930. The second ship of the class was Minsheng which was laid down in January 1931, a year after Minquan was completed. Minsheng was built to a modified design of Minquan, with lessons learned from the construction of the light cruiser Yat Sen, which was built between the two ships in 1930, applied to the Minsheng and making her a semi-sister ship to Minquan rather than being an exact copy. These changes led to a small increase in displacement by 50 long tons (51 t) and increase in length by 4 m (13 ft 1 in). The draught was also increased slightly to 2.0 m (6 ft 7 in) which would still allow the Upper Yangtze up to Chongqing but not further to Yibin. The engine layout remained the same, but with an engine output of 3,600 bhp (2,700 kW), increasing the overall top speed to 18.5 knots (34.3 km/h; 21.3 mph).

Armament was also another area of variation between the two semi-sister ships. Generally both ships had the same main and secondary armament, but tertiary and anti-aircraft armament were mounted, dismounted or swapped out often on ROCN ships in the 30s. The main armament of both ships consisted of a single bow mounted 120 mm (5 in)/45 and a single 100 mm (4 in)/45 mounted on the stern. Minquan and Minsheng at various times were also armed with a single high-angle 76 mm (3 in)/40 mounted in front of the bridge, two or three 57 mm (2 in)/40, six 7.92 mm (0 in) machine guns and/or one 20 mm (1 in)/65 anti-aircraft gun.

== Service history ==
Both ships avoided much of the ongoing turmoil of the early 1930s, with neither ship reportedly being assigned to any of the ROCN's four squadrons in 1933. By the time of the Marco Polo Bridge incident in 1937 Minsheng was located at Wuhan and Minquan at Chongqing. While Minquan guarded the temporary capital of the Republic after Battle of Nanking and avoiding the major battles of the war. Minsheng would see heavy fighting in Wuhan and would eventually be scuttled, raised by the Japanese and rebuilt as a repair ship, scuttled again in an accident, raised again, and then finally sunk again by 1944. Minquan would be captured by advancing People's Liberation Army forces.

== Ships ==
Name	Builder	Laid	Launched	Completed	Notes	Fate
Minquan (民權); Wade–Giles: Ming Chuen	Jiangnan Shipyard	16 January 1929	21 September 1929	1 January 1930	Served out war at Chongqing. Captured by People's Liberation Army on 1 December 1949.	Renamed Xianning (咸宁) on 1 December 1949. 1950 renamed Chángjiāng (长江). 1978 converted to a museum ship. Scrapped July 1981.
Minsheng (民生); Wade–Giles: Ming Sen	Jiangnan Shipyard	January 1931	5 May 1931	12 November 1931	Heavily damaged at Yuezhou on 10 October 1938 during the Battle of Wuhan by Japanese aircraft. Scuttled 27 October 1938.	Salvaged and recommissioned as the repair ship Hitonose (飛渡瀬) in 1939. Sunk in collision with the hulk of Kosho Maru at Shanghai on 21 December 1944. Salvaged again. Sunk shortly after by naval mines.

== See also ==
- USS Mindanao (PR-8) - Largest of the Jiangnan Shipyard built American gunboats and basis for later Chinese gunboats
- Japanese gunboat Saga - Contemporary Japanese gunboat with similar dimensions, armament and role
