= Chang Feng-class destroyer =

Chinese destroyer class (1912–1947)

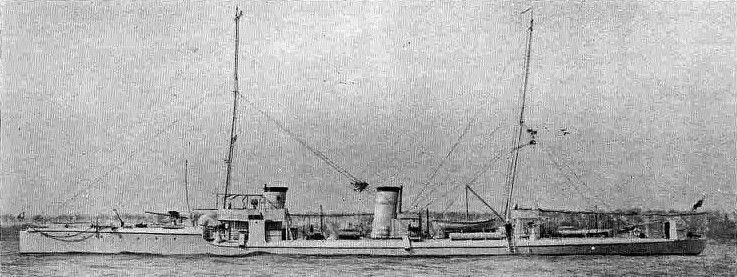
- Yu Chang, 1929

Class overview
- Name: Chang Feng class
- Builders: Schichau-Werke, Elbing, German Empire
- Operators: Imperial Chinese Navy (planned); Republic of China Navy; Imperial Japanese Navy; Republic of China-Nanjing Navy
- Preceded by: Hai Lung class
- Succeeded by: Ching Po / Lung Tuan
- Built: 1911–1912
- In commission: 1912–1947
- Completed: 3
- Lost: 2
- Retired: 1

General characteristics
- Type: Destroyer
- Displacement: 390 long tons (400 t)
- Length: 60.35 m (198 ft 0 in)
- Beam: 6.5 m (21 ft 4 in)
- Draft: 1.8 m (5 ft 11 in)
- Installed power: 6,500 shaft horsepower (4,847 kW)
- Propulsion: 2 × triple-expansion engines; 4 × Schichau water-tube boilers
- Speed: 32 knots (59 km/h; 37 mph)
- Complement: 69
- Armament: 2 × 76.2 mm QF 12-pounder 12 cwt naval guns; 4 × 47 mm QF 3-pounder Hotchkiss guns; 2 × 18-inch (457 mm) torpedo tubes

Chang Feng-class destroyer was a class of Chinese destroyer bought from Germany during the naval reconstruction at the end of the Qing dynasty. However, the 1911 Revolution had already broken out before the ships were launched, and they were inherited by the Republic of China when the ships were completed.

The three ships of this class have all experienced the turbulent period of warlord era in the early years of the Republic of China. Among them, the first ship Yu Chang (formerly Chang Feng) was lost after she was wrecked in 1932. At the beginning of the Second Sino-Japanese War in 1937, the remaining two ships, Chien Kang (formerly Fu Po) and Tung An (formerly Fei Hung) were all lost.

They were later repaired by the Japanese and transferred to the puppet Wang Jingwei regime. In 1944, Tung Chun (former Tung An) was abandoned after an uprising by members of Nanjing regime Navy. After the end of the war in 1945, Chien Kang was returned to the Chinese Navy and was retired from the Navy in 1947.

== Design and overview ==
The Qing government intended to rebuild the navy after the First Sino-Japanese War of 1894–1895 and bought warships from Britain, Germany and other countries. However, the rebuilt fleet suffered another severe damage during the Boxer Rebellion of 1900, and only managed to purchased four Hai Lung-class destroyers. The destroyers were all captured by the coalition forces. In 1909, the Qing government sent a delegation led by Zaixun, Prince Rui to visit European countries, and to order a large number of small and medium-sized warships from those countries. During visit to Germany, Zaixun ordered three destroyers from the Schichau shipyard. The first ship was ordered in 1910 at a cost of 57,965 pounds. A year later, two additional ships were ordered for a total of 115,930 pounds.

The ships of this class has a displacement of 390 long tons (400 t), a length of 60.35 m (198 ft 0 in), a beam of 6.5 m (21 ft 4 in), and a draft of 1.8 m (5 ft 11 in). The class were powered by two vertical triple-expansion steam engines with four Schichau water-tube boilers, with power output of 6,500 shaft horsepower (4,847 kW), and the maximum speed is 32 knots (59 km/h; 37 mph). During sea trial, the ship reached 36 knots (67 km/h; 41 mph). The class has a complement of 69 crew.

The class main guns were two 76.2 mm QF 12-pounder 12 cwt naval guns, located on the fore and aft. There are also four 47 mm QF 3-pounder Hotchkiss guns, two of which are installed on the port and starboard sides in front of the conning tower, and the other two are on both sides of the rear command room. The ships also armed with two 18-inch (457 mm) torpedo tubes, which were weaker than the 3-tube configuration of contemporary German destroyers. One was installed between the two funnels and the other was installed behind the aft main gun.

== Ships in the class ==
Chang Feng class
Name	Builder	Launched	Commissioned	Fate
Yu Chang (豫章) ex-Chang Feng (長風)	Schichau-Werke, Elbing	23 February 1911	7 November 1912	Wrecked after striking a rock on 21 January 1932
Chien Kang (建康) ex-Fu Po (伏波)	Schichau-Werke, Elbing	5 July 1912	7 November 1912	Sunk by Japanese air raid between 25 and 27 September 1937, later refloated and commissioned into IJN as Yamasemi, transferred to ROC-Nanjing Navy as Hai Sui December 1939, returned to ROCN after the war, stricken in July 1947
Tung An (同安) ex-Fei Yuen (飛雲) / Fei Hung / Yen Yung	Schichau-Werke, Elbing	5 July 1912	7 November 1912	Scuttled as blockship on 18 December 1937, later refloated by the Japanese in December 1939 and was given to ROC-Nanjing Navy as Tung Chun. She was abandoned after an uprising by members of ROC-Nanjing Navy in 1944 and her fate is unknown

== Bibliography ==
- Randal Gray (1986). Conway's All The World's Fighting Ships 1906-1921. London: Conway Maritime Press. ISBN 0-85177-245-5.
- Richard Wright (2000). The Chinese Steam Navy 1862-1945. London: Chatham Publishing.
- Hǎijūn Sīlìng Bù “Jìndài Zhōngguó Hǎijūn” Biānjí Bù, ed. (1994). Jìndài Zhōngguó Hǎijūn (近代中国海军). Haichao Publishing House (海潮出版社). ISBN 978-7-80054-589-4.
- Zhōngguó Hǎijūn Bǎikē Quánshū Biānshěn Wěiyuánhuì, ed. (1998). Zhōngguó Hǎijūn Bǎikē Quánshū (中国海军百科全书) (1st ed.). Beijing: Haichao Publishing House (海潮出版社). p. 900. ISBN 9787801510419. OCLC 42268477.
- Zhāng Qiān (章骞) (2012). Méngchōng Yè Tán: Zhāng Qiān Jìndài Jiàntǐng Shǐhuà Shí'èr Yè (艨艟夜谭：章骞近代舰艇史话十二夜). Qingdao: Qingdao Publishing House (青岛出版社). ISBN 978-7-5436-8615-1.
- Mǎ Yòuyuán (马幼垣) (2013). Jìng Hǎi Chéng Jiāng: Zhōngguó Jìndài Hǎijūn Shǐ Shì Xīn Quán (靖海澄疆：中国近代海军史事新诠). Zhonghua Book Company (中华书局). ISBN 978-7-101-08730-7.
- Chén Yuè (陈悦) (2012). Qīngmò Hǎijūn Jiàn Chuán Zhì (清末海军舰船志). Jinan: Shandong Pictorial Publishing House (山东画报出版社). ISBN 978-7-5474-0534-5.
- Chén Yuè (陈悦) (2015). Zhōngguó Jūnjiàn Tú Zhì 1855-1911 (中国军舰图志1855-1911). Shanghai: Shanghai Century Publishing Group (上海世纪出版股份有限公司). ISBN 978-7-5458-1154-4.
- Chén Yuè (陈悦) (March 2017). Mínguó Hǎijūn Jiàn Chuán Zhì 1938-1945 (民国海军舰船志 1938-1945). Beijing: Chinese Online Digital Publishing Group Co., Ltd. (中文在线数字出版集团股份有限公司). CAEBN 7-001-000-60741163-3.

== See also ==
- List of ships of the Chinese Navy (1644–1945)
