= Type 52 gunboat =

Class overview
- Operators: People's Liberation Army Navy

General characteristics
- Type: Gunboat
- Displacement: 50 tonnes (49 long tons; 55 short tons)
- Length: 24.64 m (80 ft 10 in)
- Beam: 4.25 m (13 ft 11 in)
- Draft: 1.16 m (3 ft 10 in)
- Installed power: Internal combustion engine
- Propulsion: 3 × General Motors GM-165 Diesel engine
- Speed: 12 knots (22 km/h; 14 mph)
- Range: 500 mi (800 km)
- Sensors & processing systems: 1 × navigational radar
- Armament: 37 mm (1.5 in) guns or; 25 mm (0.98 in) guns; 2 × 12.7 mm (0.50 in) guns

Type 52 gunboat was a type of gunboat developed by China for the People's Liberation Army Navy (PLAN) in the early 1950s, and it was the first indigenously developed gunboat in the People's Republic of China (PRC) that entered mass production

== 42 ton-class gunboat ==
Type 52 gunboat is developed directly based on the experience of two earlier gunboat built in China, one of which was the 42 ton-class gunboat developed by Jiangnan Shipyard, the first warship built in the People’s Republic of China. The design work begun in early December 1950, and construction begun on December 22, 1950. The two units built were launched on March 18 and 24 of the following year. However, due to a calculation error, the second unit sank after launch, and had to be raised and reworked. Construction was completed in October and November 1951 respectively. Specification:

- Displacement: 42 ton
- Beam: 1.75 meter
- Draft: 1.34 meter
- Propulsion: three GM6 diesel engine @ 495 horsepower, 3 shafts
- Speed: 12 kt
- Endurance: 1000 nm
- Armament: 3 Ho-103 machine guns
- Pennant #: H846 & H847

== 43 ton-class gunboat ==
The second source of Type 52 gunboat was the 43 ton-class gunboat, a total of eight were completed.In conjunction with the production of 42 ton-class gunboat, Qingdao shipyard was also ordered to build gunboats for PLAN, resulting in 43 ton-class gunboat. Specification:

- Displacement: 43 ton
- Length: 21.73 meter
- Beam: 4.01 meter
- Draft: 1.1 meter
- Propulsion: three GM6-71 diesel engine @ 495 horsepower, 3 shafts
- Speed: 11.7 kt
- Endurance: 1000 nm
- Armament: 1 Type 96 25 mm AT/AA Gun, 1 Oerlikon 20 mm cannon, & 1 Ho-103 machine gun

== Type 52 gunboat ==
Based on experience gained from 42 ton class and 43 ton-class gunboats, PLAN issued order to build 50 ton gunboat, which resulted in Type 52 gunboat,which in turn, led to Huangpu-class gunboats that include Type 52, Type 53 and Type 54 gunboats.In April 1952, PLAN asked Chinese premier Zhou Enlai for authorization to build first generation indigenously developed gunboat of PRC, and when the authorization was promptly given for a total of 30, the boat was designated as Type 52, after the year the program started. Jiangnan Shipyard was tasked to build 20 boats in four batches, 4 each for first two batches, and 6 each for the 2nd batches. Construction begun on May 15, 1952 and after half a year, all 20 were completed. Hull number was numbered from 501 thru 520. The remaining 10 boats were built by Qingdao Shipyard, more commonly known as PLAN No 4808 Factory, the predecessor of current Qingdao Shipyard Co. Ltd. (青岛造船厂有限公司).

This first generation gunboat built by PRC mostly utilizes leftover American components when communists took over, with the propulsion system being three diesel engines built by General Motors. Most armament comes from leftover Japanese weaponry. The boat was armed with two Type 96 25 mm AT/AA Gun, with one each at bow and stern respectively. A Japanese heavy machine gun was mounted at the port and starboard sides. Some of the boats have been upgraded with former Soviet 37 mm automatic air defense gun M1939 (61-K) replaced the forward 25 mm, and this upgraded version is designated as Type 52A (52 Jia Xing, 52甲型). All boats were equipped with rudimentary minesweeping gears and all boats were equipped to carry eight 41-kg depth charges. Type 52/52A have since retired from PLAN.
