= Chinese cruiser Jingyuan (1886) =

Imperial Chinese Navy's Zhiyuan-class protected cruiser

Coordinates: 37.497°N 122.171°E

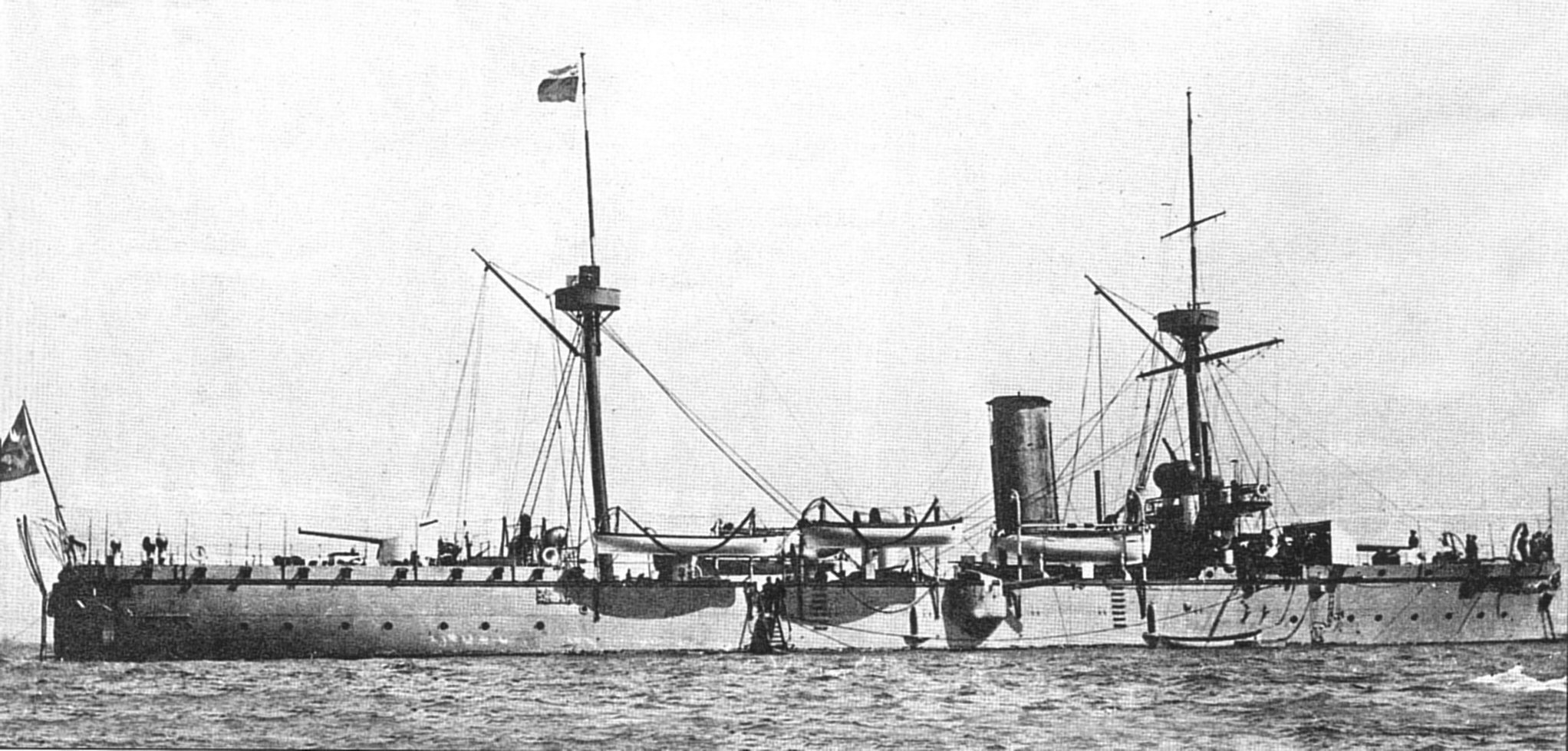
- The Chinese cruiser Jingyuan in August 1887 while in the Solent near Portsmouth

History

Imperial China
- Name: Jingyuan
- Ordered: October 1885
- Builder: Armstrong Whitworth, Elswick, England
- Yard number: 494
- Laid down: 20 October 1885
- Launched: 14 December 1886
- Completed: 9 July 1887
- Fate: Sunk in shallow water and scuttled, 9 February 1895

General characteristics
- Type: Zhiyuen-class protected cruiser
- Displacement: 2,300 long tons (2,300 t)
- Length: 268 ft (82 m)
- Beam: 38 ft (12 m)
- Draft: 15 ft (4.6 m)
- Propulsion: Compound-expansion steam engine, two screws; 4 x boilers
- Speed: 18 kn (33 km/h; 21 mph)
- Capacity: 510 tons of coal
- Complement: 204–260 officers and men
- Armament: 3 × 8-inch (20 cm) Krupp guns; 2 × 6-inch (15 cm) Armstrong guns; 8 × QF 6-pounder Hotchkiss guns; 2 x QF 3-pounder Hotchkiss guns; 8 x 1-pounder guns; 6 x gatling guns; 4 × above water torpedo tubes
- Armor: Deck armour: 4 in (10 cm) (flat), 3 in (7.6 cm) (slope); Gun shields: 2 in (5.1 cm)

Jingyuan (Chinese: 靖遠; pinyin: Jìngyuǎn; Wade–Giles: Ching Yuen) was a protected cruiser of the Imperial Chinese Navy built by Armstrong Whitworth in Elswick, England. She was one of two Zhiyuen-class protected cruisers built, alongside her sister ship Zhiyuen. Jingyuan was armed with a smaller number of large sized naval guns, as opposed to later ships of this type (such as the Royal Navy Pearl-class) which carried a larger number of smaller guns. This was because the medium-calibre quick-firing gun had yet to be introduced, thus a warship's firepower at the time was largely a function of individual shell weight rather than volume of fire.

Both ships were assigned to the Beiyang Fleet. Jingyuan was part of a flotilla which toured ports during the summer of 1889. Jingyuan first saw action during the First Sino-Japanese War. At the Battle of the Yalu River on 17 September 1894, she was one of the surviving Chinese cruisers, although suffered fire damage. She was sunk the following February during the Battle of Weihaiwei from a shot fired from a captured Chinese fort. She sank upright in shallow water, and Admiral Ding Ruchang gave orders for her to be destroyed by a naval mine. She was raised the following year for scrap.

== Design and description ==
At the time that Jingyuan was ordered in October 1885, there was a debate in naval circles over the differences between armored cruisers and protected cruisers. Viceroy of Zhili province, Li Hongzhang, was in Europe to order ships from builders in Western nations. He was unable to decide between the two types, so in an experiment, he placed orders for two vessels of each type. The order for the two Zhiyuen-class cruiser protected cruisers was given to Armstrong Whitworth in Elswick, England, known as the leading builder of these types of vessels during this period.

Jingyuan was 268 feet (82 metres) long overall. She had a beam of 38 ft (12 m) and a draught of 15 ft (4.6 m). Jingyuan displaced 2,300 long tons (2,300 tonnes), and carried a crew of 204–260 officers and enlisted men. She was equipped with an internal protective armoured deck, which was 4 inches (10 cm) thick on the slopes and 3 in (7.6 cm) on the flat. The superstructure was divided into watertight compartments and had a raised forecastle and poop, a single funnel, and two masts. She was powered by a Compound-expansion steam engine with four boilers, driving two screws. This provided 6,850 indicated horsepower (5,110 kW) for a top speed of 18.5 knots (34.3 km/h; 21.3 mph). The ship was equipped with electrics and hydraulics throughout, which included the movement of the shot from the ammunition lockers to the guns.

Earlier protected cruisers, such as the Chinese cruiser Chaoyong had been equipped with a small number of 10 in (25 cm) main guns but, although larger than this ship, Jingyuan was built with a higher freeboard to improve her seaworthiness over the smaller vessel. The resultant topweight considerations resulting from the desire to mount the main armament atop the forecastle and poop necessitated that she be armed with slightly smaller (and thus lighter) main guns than the Chaoyong. The main armament consisting of three breech-loading 8 in (20 cm) Krupp guns, two paired on a hydraulic powered rotating platform in front of the ship and a single gun mounted on a manual rotating platform in the stern, was still a powerful armament for a cruiser of her size. Both mounts were protected by 2 in (5.1 cm) thick gun shields. The secondary armament consisted of two 6-inch (15 cm) Armstrong guns mounted on sponsons on either side of the deck, compared to the four limited-traverse 4.7-inch breech-loading guns carried by the Chaoyong. The ship also had eight QF 6-pounder Hotchkiss guns on Vavasseur mountings, two QF 3-pounder Hotchkiss guns, and eight 1-pounder guns to supplement her main guns in attack or for close-range torpedo defence. Jingyuan was also equipped with weapons other than naval artillery, which included six gatling guns as well as four above water mounted torpedo tubes. One pair of the torpedo tubes was mounted forward, and another pair mounted aft where they were activated using electricity from the captain's cabin.

== Service record ==
Following the orders for the two protected cruisers by Hongzhang in October 1885, Jingyuan was laid down later on 20 October. Construction continued throughout the majority of 1886, with the ship launched on 14 December. She was officially completed on 9 July 1887. Both Jingyuan and her sister ship was Zhiyuen were laid down at the same time, but despite Zhiyuen being launched six weeks earlier than Jingyuan, she was completed two weeks later than her sister.

Following completion, both ships, along with the two armored cruisers Jingyuan and Laiyuan, (Note: The two ships named Jingyuan under the pinyin romanization system for Standard Chinese were not similarly named at the time of their operation, since pinyin was officially adopted by the Chinese Government in 1958. Instead, the protected cruiser would have been referred to as 靖遠 in Standard Chinese or Ching Yuen in Wade–Giles, the romanization system in use at the time. Meanwhile, the armored cruiser was known as 經遠 and King Yuen respectively.) as well as a newly built Chinese torpedo boat, converged in the solent near Portsmouth in August 1887. Imperial Chinese Admiral William M. Lang, formerly of the Royal Navy, was sent back to Europe to take command of the squadron as they travelled to China. With the exception of a handful of Western advisors, the ships were manned by Chinese crews. Jingyuan was under the command of Captain Yeh Tsu-kuei. While in the Solent, they were inspected by Hongzhang. It had been anticipated that they would immediately be underway for the passage to China, but following the loss of an anchor and some urgent repairs, they left on 12 September. They arrived in Amoy (now Xiamen) in November, where they remained during the winter before joining up with the Beiyang Fleet in Shanghai in the spring.

During 1888, Jingyuan was repainted along with the rest of the Chinese Navy, changing from the all grey scheme she had sailed from England with, to a combination of a black hull, white above the waterline and buff coloured funnels, typical of the Victorian era. In May 1889, Jingyuan and the Beiyang Fleet were moved to fortify Weihaiwei (now Weihai). During the summer of that year, she was part of the flotilla led by Admiral Ding Ruchang, which travelled to Chefoo (now Yantai), Chemlupo (now Incheon, South Korea), and the Imperial Russian Navy base of Vladivostok. On the return leg of the journey, they stopped at Fusan (now Busan, South Korea).

=== The Sino-Japanese War ===
Jingyuan first saw action during one of the opening engagements of the First Sino-Japanese War, in the Battle of the Yalu River on 17 September 1894. Each Chinese ship was paired with another in a supporting role in case of a signalling failure, with Jingyuan and the armored cruiser Laiyuan grouped together. (Note: Likewise, the armored cruiser Jingyuan was paired with the protected cruiser Zhiyuan.) Shortly after the start of the battle, Admiral Ruchang's signalling mast aboard the ironclad warship Dingyuan was disabled by its own weapons. This meant that the entire Chinese fleet operated in these pairs throughout the battle without any central organisation. While Jingyuan and Laiyuan did not come under such heavy fire as other Chinese vessels, they each caught fire with extensive damage to Laiyuan. Along with the other ships of the Chinese fleet, Jingyuan made her way to Port Arthur (now Lüshunkou District) after the battle. During the battle, Jingyuan's sister ship, Zhiyuen was one of the Chinese cruisers sunk by the Japanese.

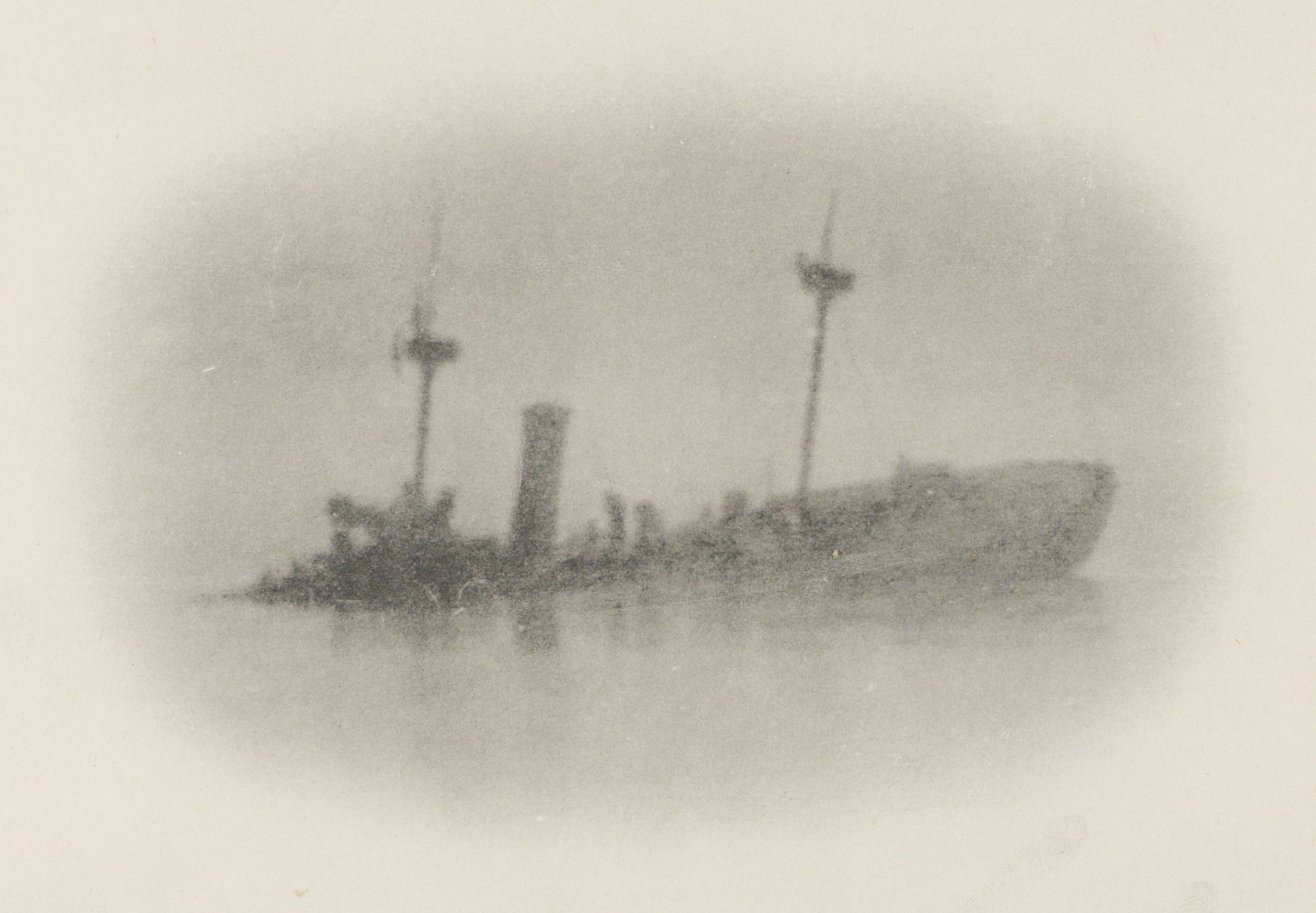
The sinking of the Chinese man-of-war Ching-Yuen in Wei-Hai-Wei harbour

Once the fleet was repaired, they sailed out on 20 October to Weihaiwei. While in the harbour, they found themselves under attack by the Imperial Japanese Army in January 1895 as the Battle of Weihaiwei commenced. As Japanese forces took control of the sea forts on either side of the harbour, the fleet found itself under bombardment during the day and torpedo boat attack during the night. One such attack during the night of 5 February saw Laiyuan sunk by a torpedo and capsized. Jingyuan was undamaged, but underwent a near-miss by a torpedo. On 9 February, while Jingyuan was operating in the eastern part of the harbour, was struck below the waterline and sank upright in shallow water. The shot was fired from one of the captured Chinese forts. To avoid eventual capture by the Japanese, Ruchang ordered for a naval mine to be placed below decks on Jingyuan and detonated later that day, destroying her. She was raised and scrapped the following year.
