= Chinese gunboat Chun Ho =

Qing Dynasty gunboat, purchased 1856

Chun Ho
History

Qing Empire
- Name: Tieh Pi (1856–1882); Chun Ho (1882–Unknown)
- Acquired: 1 September 1856

General characteristics (1856–1882, as Tieh Pi)
- Class & type: Gunboat
- Length: 39.62 m (130 ft 0 in)
- Beam: 4.87 m (16 ft 0 in)
- Draught: 1.82 m (6 ft 0 in)

General characteristics (After 1882, as Chun Ho)
- Class & type: Gunboat
- Displacement: 354 long tons (360 t)
- Length: 45.11 m (148 ft 0 in)
- Beam: 7.46 m (24 ft 6 in)
- Installed power: 1 x steam engine; 80 hp (60 kW)

Chun Ho (Chinese: 鈞和; pinyin: Jūnhé) is an early gunboat of the Qing Dynasty.

== History ==
Before her purchase, the ship was named Pu Lu (Chinese: 普魯; pinyin: Pǔlǔ). She was purchased on 1 September 1856, funded by shipping merchants in Shanghai as a response to an increase in privacy due to the Taiping Rebellion. She was transferred to Shanghai's Pirate Suppression Bureau, where she was named Tieh Pi (Chinese: 鐵皮; pinyin: Tiěpí; lit. 'Iron Skin') and used as an armed patrol vessel. She was transferred to the Ever Victorious Army, and later transferred back to Governor Li Hongzhang's fleet, where she returned to patrol duties.

In 1882, the ship was refitted with a new hull by the Jiangnan Shipyard and renamed Chun Ho.

After the Xinhai Revolution of 1911, Chun Ho remained active. She was assigned into Zhili clique warlord Sun Chuanfang's 1st Fleet. In March 1927, she was captured by the National Revolutionary Army as part of their Northern Expedition.

In the 1930s, she was transferred to the Tienlei naval academy. Her further fate is unknown.
