= Zhiyuan-class cruiser =

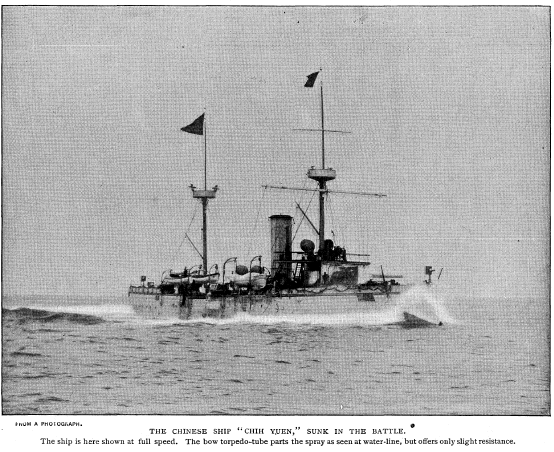
- Zhiyuan circa 1894

Class overview
- Name: Zhiyuan class
- Builders: Armstrong Whitworth, Elswick, England
- Operators: (China) Qing dynasty, Beiyang Fleet
- In service: 29 September 1886 - 9 February 1895
- Planned: 2
- Completed: 2
- Lost: 2

General characteristics
- Type: Protected cruiser
- Displacement: 2,300 long tons (2,300 t)
- Length: 268 ft (82 m)
- Beam: 38 ft (12 m)
- Draft: 15 ft (4.6 m)
- Propulsion: Compound-expansion steam engine, two screws; 4 x boilers
- Speed: 18 kn (33 km/h; 21 mph)
- Capacity: 510 tons of coal
- Complement: 204–260 officers and men
- Armament: 3 × 8 in (20 cm) Krupp guns; 2 × 15 cm MRK L/35 (6 in); 8 × QF 6-pounder Hotchkiss guns; 2 x QF 3-pounder Hotchkiss guns; 8 x 1-pounder guns; 6 x gatling guns; 4 × above water torpedo tubes
- Armour: Deck armour: 4 in (10 cm) (flat), 3 in (7.6 cm) (slope); Gun shields: 2 in (5.1 cm)

The Zhiyuan class (Chinese: 致远级; pinyin: Zhiyuanji; Wade–Giles: Chih-yuan-chi) were two protected cruisers built during the late stages of the Qing dynasty. Both were sunk during the First Sino-Japanese War.

== Context and build ==
In the late 19th century, the ships were built as part of Li Hongzhang's effort to modernize the Imperial Chinese Fleet. Zhiyuan was built first and Jingyuan followed.

Both ships were built by Armstrong Whitworth in Elswick.

The main armament of the class consisted of three Krupp 21 cm MRK L/30 breechloaders. Secondary armament consisted of two 15 cm MRK L/35 breechloaders and 8 6-pdr L/40 Hotchkiss quick firing guns. There were installations to launch four torpedoes.

== Service of this class ==
Both cruisers took part in the Battle of Yalu River during the First Sino-Japanese War, with Zhiyuan being sunk in battle and Jingyuan damaged. Jingyuan was later sunk during the Battle of Weihaiwei in January 1895.
