= Ragged Point Beach, Virginia =

Unincorporated community in Virginia, US

Coordinates: 38°08′55″N 76°36′59″W

Ragged Point Beach is an unincorporated community in Westmoreland County, in the U. S. state of Virginia.
