= Willamette (steamer) =

American Steamer in the 19c

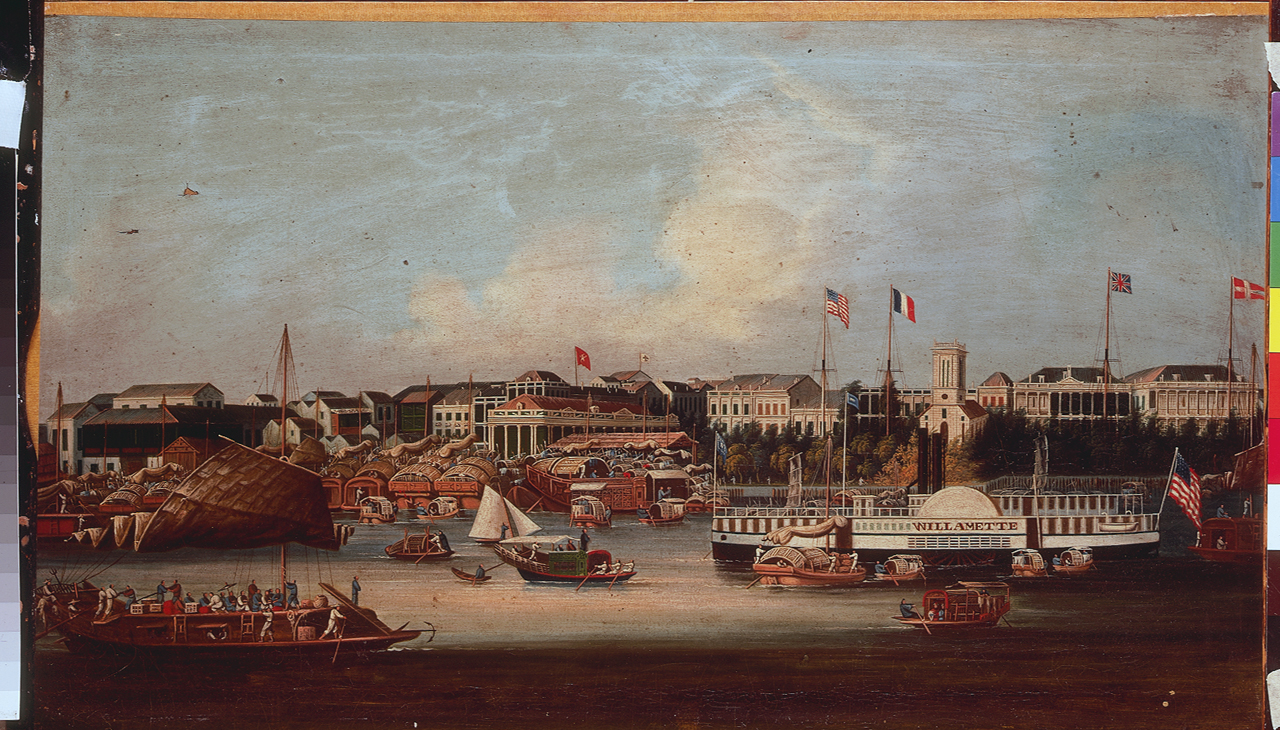
- The American paddle steamer Willamette at Canton, circa 1856

History
- Name: Willamette
- Namesake: Willamette River
- Fate: Sold 1868

General characteristics
- Class & type: Steamer
- Displacement: 200 t (197 long tons)
- Length: 160 ft (49 m)
- Beam: 28 ft (8.5 m)
- Draught: 7 ft (2.1 m)
- Capacity: 390 t (384 long tons)

Willamette (Chinese: 威林密; pinyin: Wēilínmì) was an American steamer that was later purchased by China and saw action during the Taiping Rebellion.

== History ==
Willamette was ordered by the Pacific Mail Steamship Company and built in Wilmington, Delaware as a three-masted schooner. On 5 August 1850, captained by E. W. Willet, Willamette departed Philadelphia for Astoria, Oregon Territory, sailing around Cape Horn. Willamette arrived on 9 March 1851, and was further fitted as a steamer. She began running routes along the Willamette River, carrying mail between Portland and Astoria under Captain Durbrow. However, operating the ship along this route proved too expensive. In August 1852, after "a few trips", she was transferred to San Francisco where she served along the Sacramento River. There, she was sold to the California Steam Navigation Company and transferred to China.

From January 1856, Willamette began operating along the Pearl River between Hong Kong and Canton, where she was commanded by William Curry of Savannah, Georgia. In October, her service was interrupted by the outbreak of the Second Opium War.

By 1858, the ship was acquired by the American trading house Russell & Company. Around August 1861, the managing partner of Russell & Co. in Shanghai, Edward Cunningham, persuaded Chinese merchants and compradors to invest in ownership of the ship, in order to entice the Chinese in the steamship business.

In March or April 1862, Viceroy of Liangjiang Zeng Guofan purchased the ship for use as an auxiliary vessel in the Jiangsu region. She saw service during the Taiping Rebellion as a part of a "mosquito fleet" under the Imperialist forces. By 1868, she had grown decrepit, and Jiangsu Governor Ding Richang ordered her to be sold. She was sold in late 1868.
