= Chinese cruiser Hai Yung =

19th century imperial Chinese cruiser

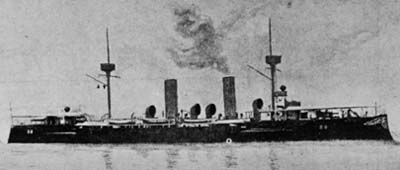

History

China
- Name: Hai Yung
- Builder: Vulcan
- Launched: 15 September 1897
- Completed: 1898
- Fate: Scuttled 11 August 1937

General characteristics
- Type: Hai Yung-class protected cruiser
- Displacement: 2680 tons
- Length: 328 ft (100.0 m)
- Beam: 40 ft 9 in (12.4 m)
- Draft: 19 ft (5.8 m)
- Propulsion: 2-shaft reciprocating VTE, 7,500 ihp (5,600 kW), 8 cylindrical boilers, 200–580 tons coal
- Speed: 19.5 knots (22.4 mph; 36.1 km/h)
- Complement: 244
- Armament: 3 × 5.9 in (15 cm) QF guns; 8 × 105 mm (4.1 in) QF guns; 3 × 14 in (360 mm) torpedo tubes
- Armour: Deck 2.75–1.5 in (70–38 mm); Gun shields 2 in (51 mm); Conning tower 1.5 in (38 mm)

Hai Yung (Chinese: 海容; pinyin: Hǎiróng) was a protected cruiser of the Imperial Chinese Navy. Hai Yung was one of a class of three ships built in Germany for the Chinese after the losses of the First Sino-Japanese War. The ship was a small protected cruiser with quick-firing guns, a departure from the prewar Chinese navy's emphasis on heavy but slow-firing weapons for its cruisers. Hai Yung resembled the British protected cruisers of the Apollo class and Italian Regioni class, and may have been modeled on the similar Dutch Gelderland-class cruisers. Germany itself would increase the number of similar ships for its own navy starting with the Gazelle class and its faster successors up until World War I.

In 1906 Hai Yung was sent on a six-month journey to survey the conditions of overseas Chinese communities in South-East Asia. Much of the navy switched loyalties to the rebellion that overthrew the Manchu dynasty in 1911.. On 24 April 1916, Hai Yung collided with the Chinese Army transport ship Hsin-Yu in the East China Sea south of the Chusan Islands. Hsin-Yu sank with the loss of about 1,000 lives.

Hai Yung and her sister ships survived the revolution and were obsolete by 1935, when they were discarded. They all were scuttled as blockships in the Yangtze on 11 August 1937 during the Second Sino-Japanese War.

== Bibliography ==
- Gardiner, Robert, ed. (1979). Conway's All the World's Fighting Ships 1860–1905. New York: Mayflower Books. ISBN 0-8317-0302-4.
- Wright, R., The Chinese Steam Navy, 1862–1945 (London, 2001)
