= Hai Yung-class cruiser =

1897 class of Chinese cruisers

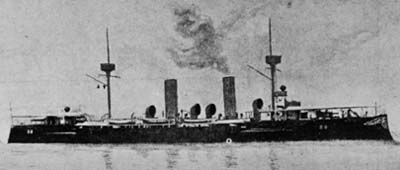
- Chinese protected cruiser Hai Yung

Class overview
- Name: Hai Yung class
- Builders: AG Vulcan Stettin, Stettin, German Empire
- Operators: Imperial Chinese Navy; Republic of China Navy
- Preceded by: Tung Chi class
- Succeeded by: Hai Qi class
- Cost: £163,000
- Built: 1896–1898
- In service: 1898–1935, 1937
- Planned: 3
- Completed: 3
- Lost: 3

General characteristics
- Type: Protected cruiser
- Displacement: 2,680 tons (standard); 2,950 t (full load)
- Length: 99.97 m (328 ft 0 in) o/a
- Beam: 12.42 m (40 ft 9 in)
- Draught: 5.79 m (19 ft 0 in)
- Propulsion: 2 shafts, 2 VTE engines, 8-cylindrical boilers, 7,500 bhp (5,600 kW)
- Speed: 19.5 knots (36.1 km/h; 22.4 mph)
- Range: 2,100–5,000 nmi (3,900–9,300 km) at 10 kn (19 km/h; 12 mph)
- Complement: 244
- Armament: 3 × 150 mm (6 in)/70 (3 × 1); 8 × 105 mm (4 in)/40 (8 × 1); 6 × 50 mm (2 in)/40 (6 × 1); 3 × 356 mm (14 in) torpedo tubes (3 × 1)
- Armour: Deck: 32–70 mm (1–3 in); Conning tower: 37 mm (1 in); Turrets: 51 mm (2 in)

The Hai Yung class (Chinese: 海容; pinyin: Hǎiróng) was a class of protected cruisers built for the Qing Dynasty from 1897 to 1898 and would then pass to the new Republic of China Navy. The ships would serve during the National Protection War, World War I, the Second Zhili–Fengtian War, and the Northern Expedition.

== Background ==
After the conclusion of the First Sino-Japanese War the Imperial Chinese Navy was decimated, with almost all major ships destroyed or captured. The following years was followed by a decade of Unequal treaties with the European great powers highlighted the need to rebuild Chinese naval strength. In May 1896 the Qing government appointed the Marquis of Suyi, Li Hongzhang to head a mission to acquire western built battleships. By the end of August 1896, the mission visited Russia (to negotiate the Li–Lobanov Treaty), Germany, France, Belgium and the United Kingdom. Li then visited the United States. Being able to only secure a modest loan and with the continued instability and turmoil in China, a more modest plan to order five protected cruisers, two protected cruisers from Armstrong Whitworth and three from AG Vulcan Stettin were ordered. Four destroyers from Schichau were also ordered. The Vulcan built ships were to be named Hai Yung (Chinese: 海容; pinyin: Hǎiróng; lit. 'Sea Capacity'), Hai Chou (Chinese: 海籌; pinyin: Hǎichóu; lit. 'Sea Token') and Hai Chen (Chinese: 海琛; pinyin: Hǎichēn; lit. 'Sea Treasure').

== Design ==
The Hai Yung class were small ocean-going class of protected cruisers with an overall length of 99.97 m (328 ft 0 in), a beam of 12.42 m (40 ft 9 in) and a draught of 5.79 m (19 ft 0 in). The ships were powered by two four-cylinder three-expansion reciprocating steam engines, fired by four coal boilers pushing two two-shaft propellers that could reach a top speed of 19.5 knots (36.1 km/h; 22.4 mph). The maximum coal bunker capacity 580 tons, with an endurance of 2,100–5,000 nmi (3,900–9,300 km; 2,400–5,800 mi) at 10 kn (19 km/h; 12 mph). The Hai Yung class were the first Chinese cruisers armed with new quick-firing guns, possessing three single 150 mm (6 in)/70 guns, a secondary battery of eight single 105 mm (4 in)/40 guns and a tertiary armament of six 50 mm (2 in)/40 guns. The ships was armed with two single 356 mm (14 in) torpedo tubes mounted on the sides and with a single tube in the bow. The Hai Yungs resembled the British Apollo-class and Italian Regioni-class protected cruisers, and may have been modeled on the similar Dutch Gelderland-class cruisers.

== Ships ==
| Name | Builder | Laid | Launched | Completed | Fate |
|---|---|---|---|---|---|
| Hai Yung (海容) pinyin: Hǎiróng | AG Vulcan Stettin | 1896 | 15 September 1897 | 27 July 1898 | Scuttled at Jiangyin on 11 August 1937 as a blockship. |
| Hai Chou (海籌) pinyin: Hǎichóu | AG Vulcan Stettin | 1896 | 11 December 1897 | 24 August 1898 | Scuttled at Jiangyin on 11 August 1937 as a blockship. |
| Hai Chen (海琛) pinyin: Hǎichēn | AG Vulcan Stettin | 1896 | 12 February 1898 | 21 September 1898 | Scuttled at Jiangyin on 11 August 1937 as a blockship. |

== See also ==
- Hai Qi-class cruiser
- Gazelle-class cruiser
