= Chinese gunboat Minquan =

Naval watercraft

History

Republic of China
- Name: Minquan
- Builder: Jiangnan Shipyard
- Laid down: 16 January 1929
- Launched: 21 September 1929
- Completed: January 1930

General characteristics
- Type: Gunboat
- Displacement: 460 long tons (467 t)
- Length: 196.7 ft (60.0 m)
- Beam: 26 ft (7.9 m)
- Draught: 6 ft (1.8 m)
- Propulsion: 2 x boilers; Triple-expansion steam engine driving 2 shafts; Total: 2,600 hp (1,900 kW)
- Speed: 17.5 knots (20.1 mph; 32.4 km/h)
- Complement: 115
- Armament: 1 × 4.7 in QF; 1 × 4 in QF; 3 × 6 pdr; 6 x machine guns

Minquan was a gunboat of the Republic of China Navy (ROCN). It was constructed at the Jiangnan Shipyard and completed in 1930. During the Second World War, it was part of the ROCN's Second Squadron.
