= Battle of Pungdo =

1894 naval battle between China and Japan

Coordinates: 37.0968°N 126.5827°E

- Part of the First Sino-Japanese War
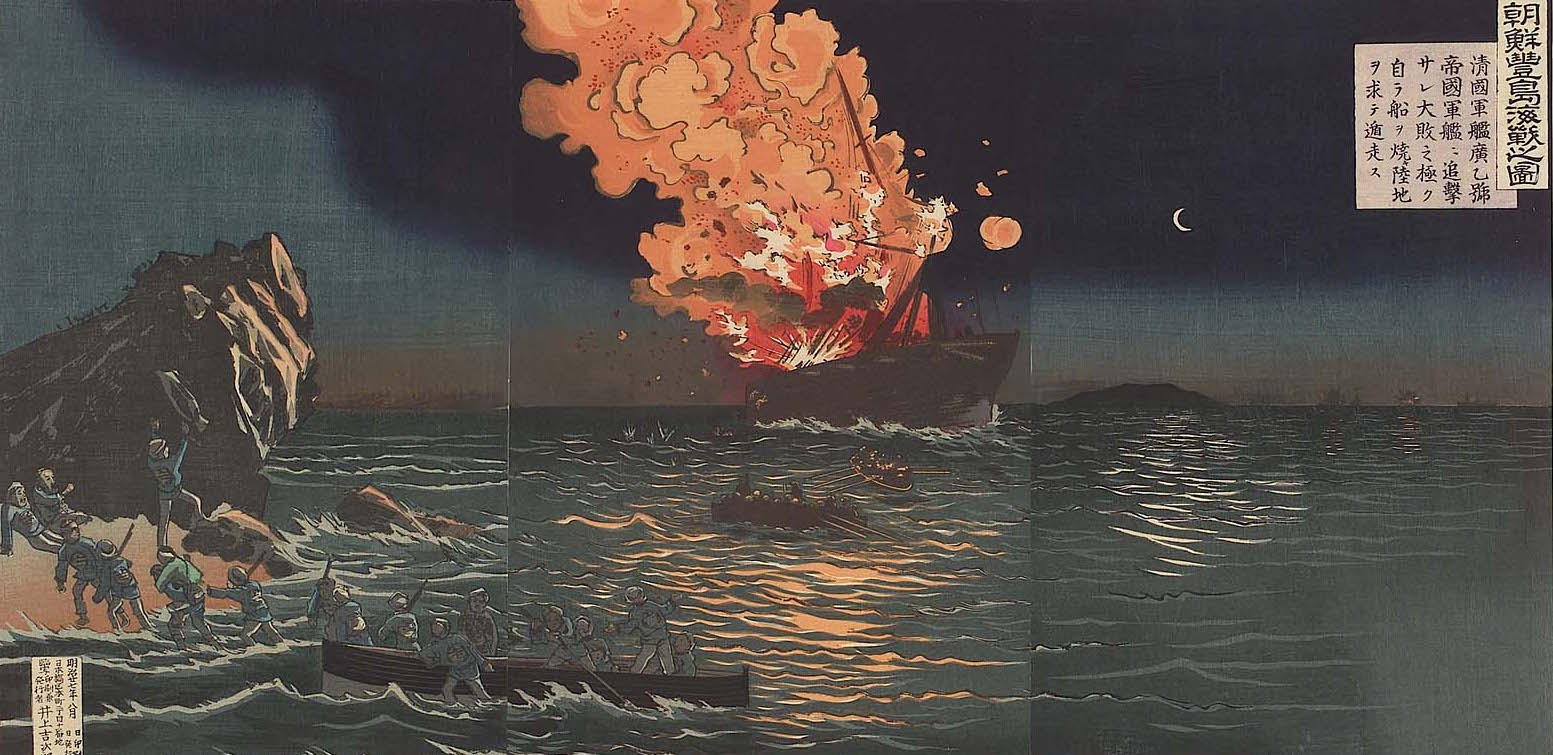
- Chôsen Hôtô kaisen no zu, Kobayashi Kiyochika
Date	25 July 1894
Location	Off Pungdo, Korea Bay
Result	Japanese victory

Belligerents
Japan	China

Commanders and leaders
Tsuboi Kōzō; Itō Sukeyuki	Fang Boqian

Strength
3 protected cruisers	2 protected cruisers 1 gunboat 1 transport ship

Casualties and losses
1 protected cruiser damaged	1,100 killed and wounded 1 protected cruiser destroyed 1 gunboat captured 1 transport ship sunk 1 protected cruiser damaged

The Battle of Pungdo (Japanese: 豊島沖海戦, romanized: Hoto-oki kaisen) was the first naval battle of the First Sino-Japanese War. It took place on 25 July 1894 off Asan, Chungcheongnam-do, Korea, between cruisers of the Imperial Japanese Navy and components of the Chinese Beiyang Fleet. Both China and Japan had been intervening in Korea against the Donghak Peasant Revolution. While China tried to maintain its suzerain relationship with Korea, Japan wanted to increase its sphere of influence.

Both countries had already sent troops to Korea as requested by different factions within the Korean government. Chinese troops from the Huai Army, were stationed in Asan, south of Seoul, numbering 3,000 men in early July, could be effectively supplied only by sea through the Bay of Asan. The Japanese plan was to blockade the entrance of the Bay of Asan, while its land forces moved overland to encircle the Chinese detachment in Asan before reinforcements arrived by sea.

== Background ==
In the early months of 1894, the Donghak Rebellion broke out in southern Korea and soon spread throughout the rest of the country, threatening the Korean capital, Seoul, itself. From the beginning of May, the Chinese had taken steps to prepare for the mobilization of their forces in the provinces of Zhili, Shandong and in Manchuria, as a result of the tense situation on the Korean peninsula. These actions were planned more as an armed demonstration to strengthen the Chinese position in Korea rather than as preparation for war with Japan. On June 3, the Chinese government accepted requests from the Korean government to send troops to help quell the rebellion and informed the Japanese of their action. The decision was made to send 2,500 men under the command of General Ye Zhichao to the harbour of Asan, about 70 km (43 mi) from Seoul. The troops destined for Korea sailed onboard three steamers chartered by the Chinese government and arrived in Asan on June 9. On June 25, an additional 400 troops arrived. Consequently, Ye Zhichao had about 2,900 soldiers under his command at Asan by the end of June.

From the very outset, developments in Korea had been carefully observed in Tokyo. The Japanese government was quickly convinced that the Donghak Rebellion would lead to Chinese intervention in Korea. As a result, soon after learning of the Korean government's request for Chinese military help, all Japanese warships in the vicinity were immediately ordered to Pusan and Chemulpo. By June 9, Yamato, Tsukushi, Akagi, Matsushima and Chiyoda had consecutively called at Chemulpo, while Takao arrived at Pusan. A formation of 420 sailors, selected from the crews of the Japanese warships anchored in Chempulo, was immediately dispatched to Seoul and managed to enter the city the same day. There they served, temporarily, as a counterbalance to the Chinese troops camped at Asan. Simultaneously, the Japanese government elected to send a reinforced brigade (9th Brigade of the 5th Division) under the command of General Oshima Yoshimasa to Chemulpo. Altogether, with auxiliary units, there were approximately 8,000 troops in the reinforced brigade. The first battalion arrived in Korea on June 12, relieving the sailors in Seoul the following day. The rest of the reinforced brigade was transported to Chemulpo by June 27.

The Japanese were willing to withdraw the brigade under General Oshima if the Chinese first left Asan. However, when on July 16, 8,000 Chinese troops landed near the entrance of the Taedong River to reinforce Chinese troops garrisoned in Pyongyang, the Japanese delivered Li Hongzhang an ultimatum, threatening to take action if any additional troops were sent to Korea. Consequently, General Oshima in Seoul and commanders of the Japanese warships in Korean waters received orders to initiate military operations if any more Chinese troops were sent to Korea.

Despite this injunction, Li probably suspected that the Japanese were bluffing and were trying to measure Chinese readiness to make concessions. He decided, therefore, to reinforce General Ye's forces in Asan with an additional 2,500 troops, who were embarked at Dagu on board three chartered means of transport. The first two of these, Irene and Fei Ching, carried a total of 1,300 troops and arrived at Asan on the night of July 23–24, escorted in Korean waters by the cruiser Jiyuan and the torpedo gunboat Kwang-yi. In addition, the small cruiser Weiyuan was stationed at Chemulpo. At the same time, in the early morning of July 23, the Japanese had taken control of the Royal Palace in Seoul and imprisoned King Gojong, forcing him to renounce ties with China.

=== Japanese strategy ===
Planning to strengthen their forces in Korea, the Imperial Japanese Navy redeployed the main component of the Combined Fleet to Korean waters, since the ships stationed there at the time, Yaeyama, Musashi and Ōshima, were considered insufficient to prevent Chinese reinforcements from landing at Asan, and, in the event of hostilities breaking out, would not be able to provide support to Japanese troops on the Korean peninsula. Consequently, on July 23, fifteen major warships and seven torpedo boats, under the command of Vice-Admiral Itō, left Sasebo and headed for Gunsan on the western coast of Korea. Gunsan, chosen due to its strategic location and telegraphic connection with Japan, would become a temporary naval base for the Japanese Fleet.

A Flying Squadron under Rear-Admiral Tsuboi, comprising the cruisers Yoshino, Akitsushima and Naniwa, was detached from the main fleet in order to rendezvous with the cruiser Yaeyama and the gunboat Ōshima, which were stationed in Chemulpo, near the island of Pungdo. Together they were to patrol the western coast and prevent the landing of Chinese reinforcements. Musashi, which was also stationed at Chemulpo, was not to join the patrol but instead accompany the main fleet at Gunsan. However, the orders wired for the commanders of the three ships at Chemulpo never came through as the telegraph line was severed by Donghaks. As a result, Yaeyama and Oshima remained at Chemulpo, ignorant of the order to rendezvous with the Flying Squadron.

=== Chinese strategy ===
With tensions increasing over the situation on the Peninsula, the Chinese government chartered three British steamers to carry reinforcements to Korea in late July to bolster their position there. The three troopships were escorted by the cruiser Jiyuan and the gunboats Kwang-Yi and Tsao-kiang. Captain Fang Boqian received word of the Japanese actions in Seoul and Chempulo from the commander of Weiyuan, and on July 25 immediately sent Irene and Fei Ching back to Dagu, while Weiyuan was ordered back to Weihaiwei to inform Admiral Ding Ruchang of the situation unfolding in Korea. Fang Boqian decided to remain at Asan Bay along with the cruiser Jiyuan and the torpedo gunboat Kwang-Yi to await the last of the transports, Kowshing, which left Dagu on July 23 with 1,200 Chinese troops and 12 pieces of artillery on board.

After the takeover of Chemulpo and Seoul by Japanese troops, events eased a little. Fearing escalating tensions in relations with Japan, the Chinese withheld sending reinforcements to Asan. Furthermore, at the beginning of July, the Chinese withdrew most of their ships stationed in Korean waters. However, to prevent the Japanese from perceiving the Chinese actions as a sign of weakness, Li Hongzhang decided to send reinforcements to Korea – though they were to be stationed in the north, at Pyongyang. For the Chinese, this move would allow for the potential withdrawal of General Ye's forces from Asan while expressing goodwill as far as peaceful settlement of the conflict was concerned. At the same time, with the forces stationed at Pyongyang, the Chinese would not lose control over the development of events. If the Japanese remained at Chemulpo and Seoul, it would be possible to launch a large offensive in 1895 to drive the Japanese from Korea.

The Chinese cruiser Jiyuan and torpedo gunboat Kwang-Yi, in port in Asan since 23 July, left on the morning of 25 July to rendezvous with the troopship Kowshing and gunboat Tsao-kiang, which were en route from Tianjin. At 7:45 am, near Pungdo, a small island (also known as "Feng Island" in Western sources) sitting next to the two navigable channels out of the Bay of Asan, in Korean territorial waters, the two Chinese ships were fired upon by the Japanese cruisers Akitsushima, Naniwa, and Yoshino. Chinese ships returned fire at 0752 hours.

== Battle ==
=== Initial sighting ===
During the early morning of July 25, Rear-Admiral Tsuboi's squadron arrived at the rendezvous point near Pungdo island without sighting Yaeyama or Ōshima. Speculating that their commanders had mistakenly headed for the main Island of Pungdo, which was located just under 20 nautical miles (37 km; 23 mi) to the south, Tsuboi set course for the island. Approaching Pungdo at 6.30 am, the Japanese vessels spotted two warships heading south-west; they turned out to be the Chinese cruiser Jiyuan and the torpedo gunboat Kwang-yi. Tsuboi correctly assumed them to be the escorts of the Chinese troop transports. At the same time Tsuboi sought to continue to investigate why the two Japanese warships from Chemulpo had not arrived at the prearranged location. For these reasons, Tsuboi made a straight course for the Chinese warships, simultaneously sounding general quarters.

The commander of Jiyuan, Captain Fang Boqian, had spotted the Japanese warships at approximately the same time and was alarmed by their appearance. The Chinese ships increased their speed and headed south-west in order to escape the closed waters of Asan Bay. Noticing the Chinese maneuver, the Japanese cruisers in turn increased their speed to 15 knots (28 km/h; 17 mph), in line ahead formation with Yoshino leading Naniwa and Akitsushima. Tsuboi clearly desired to outmaneuver the Chinese and prevent their escape to open water; however, realizing that this would not be possible, he executed a turn to port bearing west, in order to converge with the Chinese.

=== Engagement ===
At around 7:45 am the distance between the flagship Yoshino and Jiyuan was roughly three km (1.9 mi); for a short while the Japanese and Chinese warships were steaming on a convergent heading, observing each other, but at 7.52 am the cruiser Naniwa unexpectedly opened fire on Jiyuan. Immediately after Naniwa opened fire, Yoshino and Akitsushima followed suit. Yoshino and Naniwa concentrated their fire on the leading Jiyuan, while Akitsushima concentrated its fire on the torpedo gunboat Kwang-yi, which was trailing over a kilometre behind the stern of the Chinese cruiser. Although the Chinese warships had not been caught by surprise and soon returned fire, the Japanese had gained the advantage. The first projectiles fired by Yoshino and Naniwa hit Jiyuan's conning tower, demolishing it and damaging the steering mechanism. The next volley of shells then put both forward heavy barbette-mounted guns out of action. Furthermore, the hail of Japanese shelling started numerous fires in the midship section, which, though relatively minor, caused panic among the Chinese gun crews on the upper deck. It was only through the intervention of some of the officers, armed with revolvers, that the gunners were rounded up and returned to their positions. After getting the situation under control, Jiyuan managed to escape to the open sea; its crew soon repaired the steering mechanism, which allowed the cruiser to regain her manoeuvrability.

=== Destruction of Kwang-yi ===
Kwang-yi, following Jiyuan, did not fare as well. Like Jiyuan, the vessel was hit at the beginning of the battle; however, the damage inflicted by the Japanese gunfire was much more serious. Shells fired by Akitsushima penetrated the hull of the warship below the waterline at least once and damaged her boiler room. The heavily damaged Kwang-yi was rapidly taking on water; as a result, Captain Lin Kuohsiang ordered the ship to be beached. Enveloped in smoke and steam, and with fires raging on board, Kwang-yi turned southeast and stranded herself on the shore on some shoals, being fired upon by Naniwa all the while. After being abandoned by her crew, the wreck of Kwang-yi was destroyed by raging fires and internal explosions. At least 37 crew members were killed, while another 71, including the captain, Lin Kuohsiang, reached the shore. After a failed attempt to join Chinese troops at Asan, they were taken on board the Royal Navy torpedo cruisers Archer and Porpoise at the end of July and transported to Chefoo.

=== Pursuit of Jiyuan ===
The destruction of Kwang-yi took the Japanese squadron no more than a quarter of an hour and did not hinder the pursuit of Jiyuan. The plight of the single Chinese cruiser seemed dire, largely because the Japanese had the advantage of speed. At about 8.10 am, Yoshino and Naniwa were almost abeam of the escaping Chinese cruiser, and when Naniwa turned to close on her, Captain Fang contemplated surrendering his vessel, considering further combat to be pointless. At this moment, however, an unexpected turn of events took place: Yoshino spotted smoke from on the horizon from two unknown vessels which were probably heading towards Asan. It later turned out that they were the transport ship Kowshing, which had sailed from Taku carrying Chinese troops, and the gunboat Tsao-Kiang, which had departed from Weihaiwei with mail and orders. Their arrival turned Japanese attention away from Jiyuan, which took the opportunity to increase to full speed and escape heading west, away from the Japanese squadron. At the same moment, after spotting the Japanese warships, Tsao-Kiang also turned and headed back to Weihaiwei. Whereas, Kowshing continued on course to Asan.

In light of the appearance of the two new vessels, Rear-Admiral Tsuboi relinquished his chase of Jiyuan and decided to instead investigate the unknown vessels approaching from the north-west. Tsuboi had correctly suspected that Kowshing was carrying reinforcements for the Chinese forces at Asan, the prevention of which was the Flying Squadron's main objective.

=== Re-engagement of the pursuit ===
The three Japanese cruisers intercepted Kowshing, and there was a break in the pursuit which lasted until 9.50 am. While Naniwa started to search the ship and the events surrounding the sinking of Kowshing unfolded, Yoshino and the Akitsushima re-engaged and began to pursue the remaining two ships. Both Japanese cruisers headed at full speed after the Chinese warships which were trying to escape to Weihaiwei. The gunboat Tsao-Kiang was caught at 11.37 am and surrendered without a fight to Akitsushima. After 11.40 am, only Yoshino continued the chase after the remaining ship, Jiyuan. Yoshino, due to the advantage of speed, quickly closed the distance and at 12.05 pm, the Japanese cruiser commenced firing at Jiyuan with her forward guns at a distance of approximately 2.5 km (1.6 mi). Captain Fang Boqian steered the cruiser among some shoals, which were dangerous and poorly-charted, however this risky move saved the ship from destruction as the Japanese were not in possession of accurate maps of the area and they feared risking running aground on the shoals. Consequently, at 12.43 pm, Yoshino turned back towards the Korean coast and Jiyuan reached Weihaiwei in the morning of July 26.

== Kowshing Incident ==
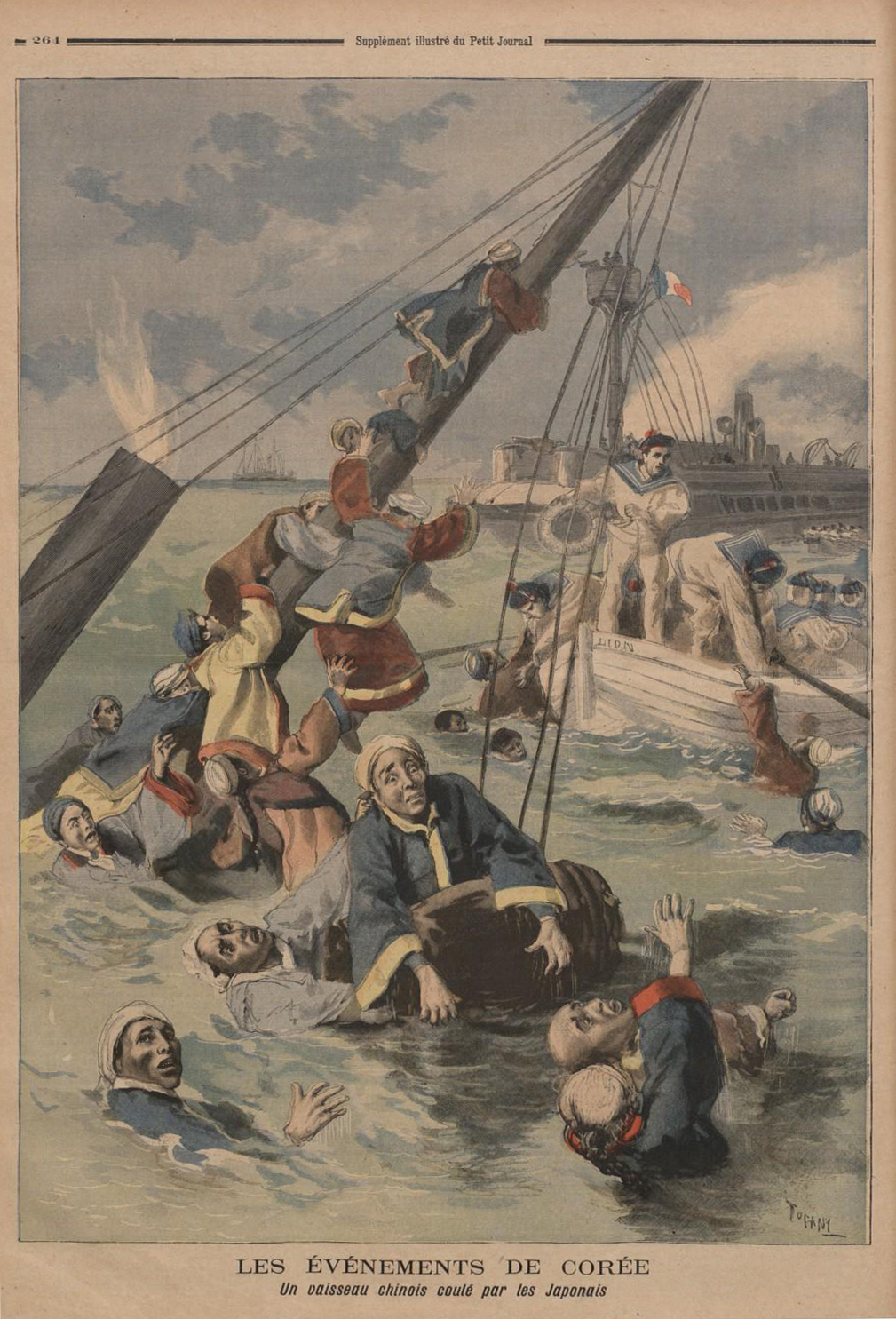
Illustration from the French newspaper Le Petit Journal, showing survivors from Kowshing being rescued by sailors from the French ship Le Lion

Neither the captain of Kowshing, Englishman Thomas Ryder Galsworthy, nor anyone else on board the vessel was aware of the encounter fought at Pungdo. At about 8.30 am Jiyuan, which was fleeing the battle, had passed Kowshing, but for reasons unknown, the Chinese cruiser did not inform Kowshing. Jiyuan was also misidentified by the transport as being Japanese; therefore, when the three cruisers of the Flying Squadron approached, Captain Galsworthy was neither surprised or even worried, as he thought that the Japanese vessels would be more concerned with the gunboat Tsao-kiang which had been escorting Kowshing since about 7.00 am. Regardless, Kowshing was a British vessel which had only been temporarily chartered by the Chinese government. As a consequence Captain Galsworthy felt safe under the protection of the British civil ensign.

At approximately 9.00 am Kowshing was ordered to follow the Japanese cruiser Naniwa to the main Japanese squadron. After a formal protest citing the neutrality of the British flag, Captain Galsworthy agreed. However, the Chinese soldiers on board objected and threatened to kill the crew unless Galsworthy took them back to China. After four hours of negotiation, when the Beiyang troops were momentarily distracted, Galsworthy and the British crew jumped overboard and attempted to swim to Naniwa, but were fired upon by the Chinese. Most of the sailors were killed, but Galsworthy and two crewmen were rescued by the Japanese. Naniwa then opened fire on Kowshing, sinking her and the troops on board. A few (including German military advisor Major Constantin von Hanneken) escaped by swimming and were rescued by local fishermen. The first officer of Kowshing gave an interview to The Times on 25 October 1894 stating that the Chinese were distracted by a torpedo launched from Naniwa, which failed to explode, and that he was only able to jump overboard after Naniwa started shelling Kowshing. While in the water, he was fired upon and wounded by the Chinese, but was rescued by the Japanese along with other European survivors. He also stated that Naniwa sank two lifeboats full of Chinese troops. Only three out of the forty three crew of Kowshing survived the sinking.

Chinese casualties were approximately 1,100, including more than 800 from the troop transport Kowshing alone, with the Japanese suffering light casualties and only 1 ship lightly damaged. Some 300 Chinese troops survived by swimming to nearby islands. They were later rescued by the German gunboat Iltis and the French gunboat Le Lion.

== Aftermath ==
Jiyuan arrived in Weihaiwei with news of the encounter and immediately underwent two weeks of repair work, as the damage the ship had sustained was quite serious. Sixteen of her crew had been killed and 25 wounded. Yoshino and Akitsushima, along with the captured gunboat Tsao-Kiang, returned to the vicinity of Pungdo Island, where they made rendezvous with Naniwa and Yaeyama, Musashi and Ōshima, which had just arrived from Chemulpo. Later that day, Rear Admiral Tsuboi ordered Yaeyama, Musashi and Ōshima, along with Akitsushima andTsao-Kiang, to join the main fleet at Kunsan under Vice-Admiral Itō.

The battle had a direct impact on the fighting on land. The reinforcements, together with twelve pieces of artillery on board Kowshing, and other military supplies on board Tsao-kiang, failed to reach Asan. The outnumbered and isolated Chinese detachment in Asan was attacked and defeated in the subsequent Battle of Seonghwan, four days later. Formal declarations of war came only on August 1, 1894, after the battle.

Naniwa was under the command of Captain (later Fleet Admiral) Tōgō Heihachirō. The owners of Kowshing launched protests against the sinking in the press and demanded compensation from the Japanese government. The response of the British public to Japan having fired upon a vessel flying the Red Ensign was negative, and the sinking almost led to a diplomatic incident between the two nations. Japan came under criticism for having failed to make any effort to rescue any of the Chinese survivors of the sinking. However, calls for Japan to pay an indemnity quickly ceased after British jurists ruled that the action was in conformity with international law regarding the treatment of mutineers. The sinking was also specifically cited by the Chinese government as one of the "treacherous actions" by the Japanese in their formal declaration of war against Japan.

One major result of this battle was the introduction of Western maritime prize rules into Japanese law. On August 21, 1894, a new Japanese law provided for the establishment of a Japanese prize court at Sasebo to judge on such matters.

In 2000, a Korean salvage company tried to salvage the wreck of Kowshing, claiming to investors that the ship contained a treasure of gold and silver bullion. The wreckage was destroyed in the operation, and only a few artifacts of little monetary value were discovered.
