= Battle of Pyongyang (1894) =

1894 battle of the First Sino-Japanese War

Coordinates: 39°02′N 125°45′E

- Part of the First Sino-Japanese War
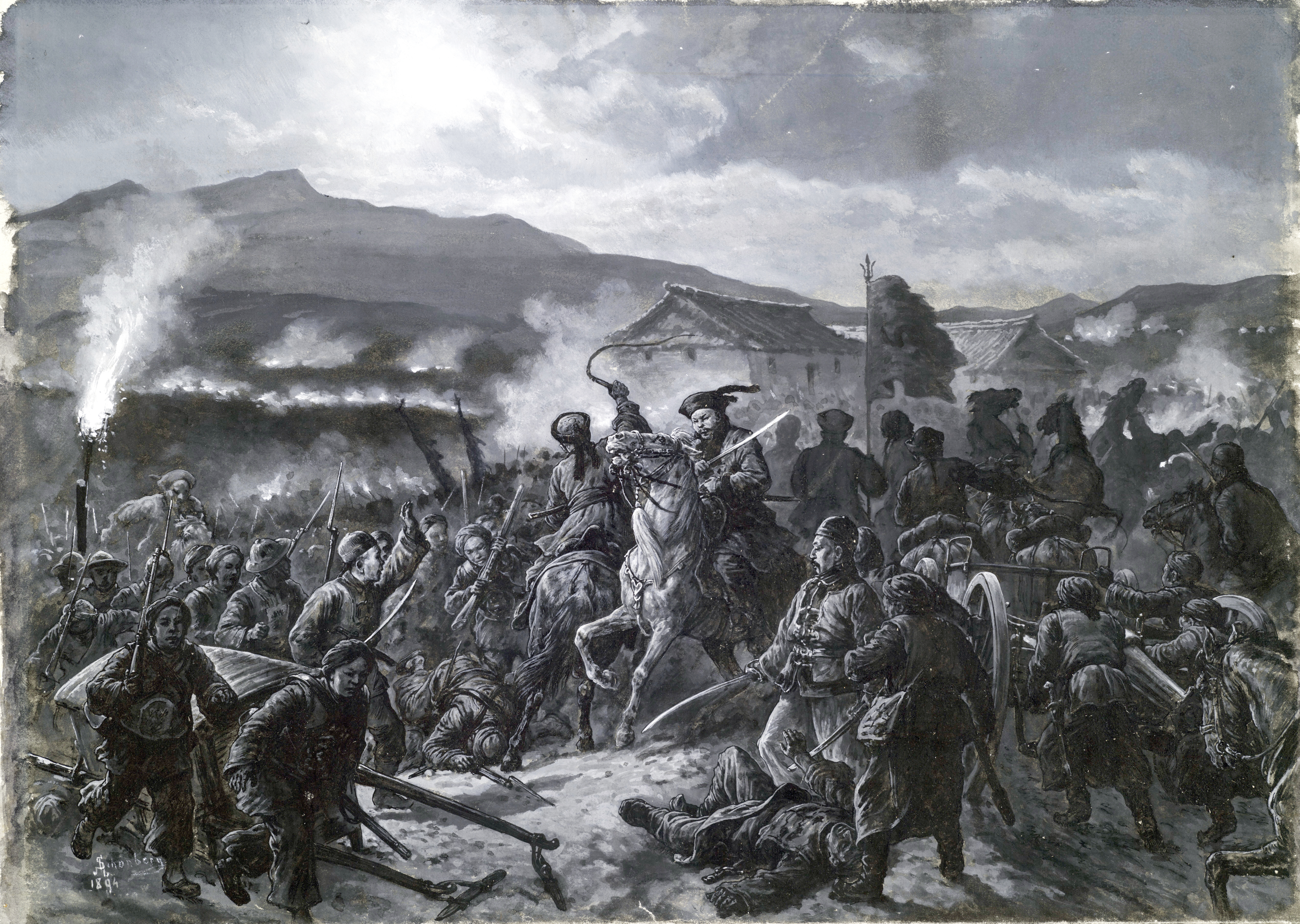
- Battle of Ping Yang: The routing of the Chinese Army; Johann Schönberg, 1894
Date	15 September 1894
Location	Pyongyang, Korea
Result	Japanese victory

Belligerents
Japan	China

Commanders and leaders
Yamagata Aritomo; Ōyama Iwao; Nozu Michitsura; Katsura Tarō	Ye Zhichao; Zuo Baogui †; Wei Rugui (executed)

Units involved
1st Army	Huai Army

Strength
~10,000 troops (Japanese sources); 20,000+ troops (Chinese sources); 23,800 troops (Fung, 1996)	20,000 troops 35 artillery guns 6 machine guns

Casualties and losses
162 killed 438 wounded 33 missing in action 633 total	2,000 killed 700 taken prisoner (including 100 wounded)
- 4 Japanese gunboats provided naval artillery support during the battle (Tsukushi, Chokai, Maya and Banjo) (Piotr Olender)

The Battle of Pyongyang (Japanese: 平壌作戦; Chinese: 平壤之戰) was the second major land battle of the First Sino-Japanese War. It took place on 15 September 1894 in Pyongyang, Korea between the forces of Japan and the Qing dynasty of China. It is sometimes referred to archaically in Western sources as the "Battle of Ping-yang".

About 20,000 Chinese troops of the Huai Army under the overall command of General Ye Zhichao had arrived in Pyongyang on 4 August 1894. They had made extensive repairs to its ancient city walls, feeling themselves secure in their superior numbers and in the strength of the defenses. The Huai Army had China's best troops, and they were equipped with modern weaponry, including Mauser breechloader rifles, Krupp artillery pieces, and a large quantity of ammunition. The Chinese military command intended that Pyongyang would be their headquarters in Korea.

Prince Yamagata Aritomo's First Army, of the Imperial Japanese Army, converged on Pyongyang from several directions on 15 September 1894. In the morning he made a direct attack on the north and southeast corners of the walled city under very little cover. The Chinese defense was strong, but was outmaneuvered by an unexpected flanking attack by the Japanese from the rear. This caused the Chinese very heavy losses compared to the Japanese. After the battle the Japanese captured a large amount of Chinese rifles, artillery pieces, and ammunition that was left behind.

After their defeat at Pyongyang, the Chinese abandoned northern Korea and withdrew to the Yalu River, which formed the Chinese–Korean border. With the loss in Korea of the Qing dynasty's best trained forces, their army in Manchuria was reinforced by less capable and partially reformed Green Standard units.

== Background ==
=== Chinese preparations at Pyongyang ===
Although the Chinese were defeated by the Japanese at Seonghwan, the bulk of the Chinese forces in Korea was not stationed near Seonghwan but in the northern city of Pyongyang. The city lies on the right bank of the Taedong River, which was large enough to provide a shipping route to the sea. Of the Chinese troops deployed at Pyongyang, eight thousand arrived at the city by sea and another five thousand made the overland journey from Manchuria. The forces in Pyongyang were joined by retreating Chinese troops from Asan under Ye Zhichao. By Chinese standards, the troops in Pyongyang had received modern training and equipment. Some of the infantry carried American Winchester rifles, and they also had four field artillery pieces, six machine-guns and twenty-eight mountain guns. These weapons, however, were not standardized and a major concern was the proper supply of ammunition.

Between early August and mid-September, the Chinese troops in Pyongyang reinforced the walled stronghold with massive earthworks, and the location of the city itself contributed to a substantial defensive position. Directly to the north were hills, and the highest of these – Moktan-tei – overlooked the entire area. To the east and south was the broad Taedong river, where forts had been built to deter any enemy from crossing. The terrain was open only to the southwest; this was where the Chinese had constructed solid redoubts.

=== Japanese advance to Pyongyang ===
After the victory at Seonghwan, the Japanese reinforced a brigade of 8,000 soldiers – under the command of General Oshima. More than 7,000 of these troops were concentrated at Seoul and Chemulpo. The Japanese now controlled the southern and central part of the country. However, as the Chinese still had most of their troops in the northern Korea, the Japanese military situation required an immediate deployment of reinforcements to Korea.

Since the main objective of the Japanese was the Chinese force concentrated at Pyongyang, they had four routes on which to deploy their troops to Pyongyang – one through via Chemulpo, another through Pusan, one from Wonsan on the eastern coast of Korea or by landing directly at the mouth of the Taedong River in the immediate vicinity of Pyongyang. Since the Japanese were hard pressed for time, as part of their strategy they needed to drive the Chinese troops from Korea before winter to avoid prolonged military operations. Thus the route through Pusan was rejected. Although transporting the troops there would not have been a problem for the Japanese as the transports would remain safely beyond the reach of the Chinese Fleet. The Japanese troops would have to travel over 650 km by land to reach Pyongyang; however, the condition of Korean roads required much time to reach Pyongyang. The Japanese decided to transport their forces to Chemulpo on the west coast and with some to Wonsan, on the east. It was still not easy to reach Pyongyang from Wonsan, again due to the condition of Korean roads, but the distance was only about 160 km and the harbour was completely safe as Japanese transports could sail there without escort. The Japanese did exclude the idea of landing troops at the mouth of the Taidong River; however, due to the risk of such operation, it was considered a last resort.

In Japan, a fleet of 30 transports had been commandeered for the conflict, assembled near the port of Hiroshima – the primary harbour for embarkation to Korea. They were to depart in groups, heading to Korea without escort, transports to Chemulpo would be escorted by warships. The number of transports allowed the Japanese to redeploy no more than 10–15,000 troops to Korea at a time, this was also taking into consideration the fact that apart from soldiers there were substantial numbers of coolies, equipment and supplies to be transported meaning that the Japanese were able to redeploy one brigade at a time.

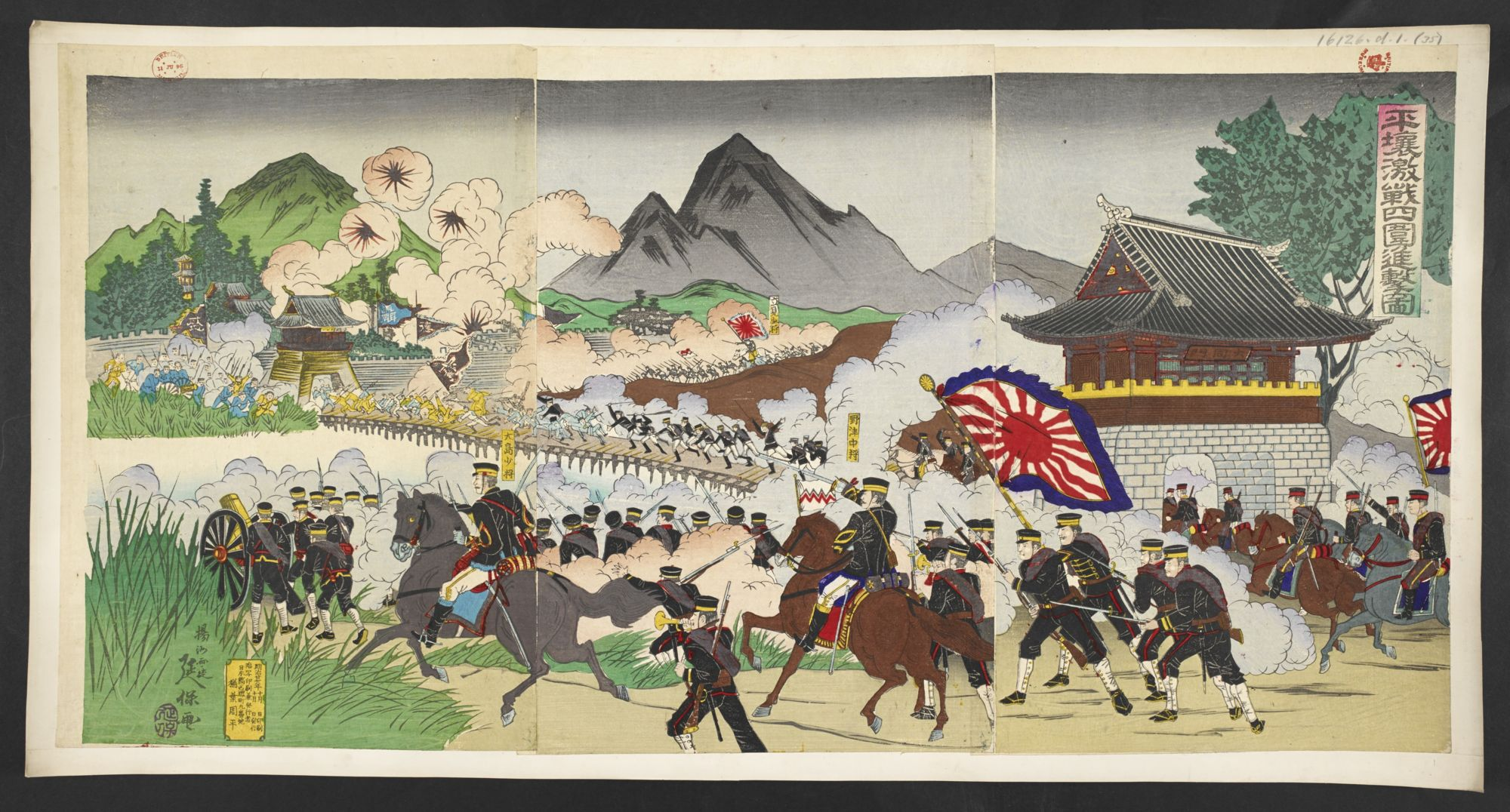
The ability of the Japanese troops to concentrate artillery and move their infantry allowed them to defeat Qing forces.

=== Japanese strategy ===
The 10,000 troops (not confirmed) of the Imperial Japanese 1st Army, under the overall command of Marshal Yamagata Aritomo consisted of the 5th Provincial Division (Hiroshima) under Lieutenant General, and the 3rd Provincial Division (Nagoya) under Lieutenant General Katsura Tarō. Japanese forces had landed at Chemulpo (modern Inchon, Korea) on 12 June 1894 without opposition. After a brief sortie south for the Battle of Seonghwan on 29 July 1894, the First Army moved towards Pyongyang, rendezvousing with reinforcements, which had landed via the ports of Busan and Wonsan.

Although the Japanese forces were under the overall command of General Yamagata and he was responsible for orchestrating the strategy at Pyongyang, Yamagata did not land with his forces at Chempulo until 12 September. Lieutenant-General Nozu Michitsura commanded the Japanese troops involved in the attack on Pyongyang; which included the Wonson column under Colonel Sato Tadashi, the Sangnyong column under Major-General Tatsumi Naobumi, the Combined Brigade under Major-General Oshima Yoshimasa and finally the Main Division under Nozu himself. The plan of attack was for the Combined Brigade to make the frontal assault from the south, while the Main Division attacked from the southwest. Flanking actions would then be carried out by the two columns. If the Chinese tried to retreat, the Wonson column was given the duty of intercepting and harrying the enemy as it fled to the northeast.

== The battle ==
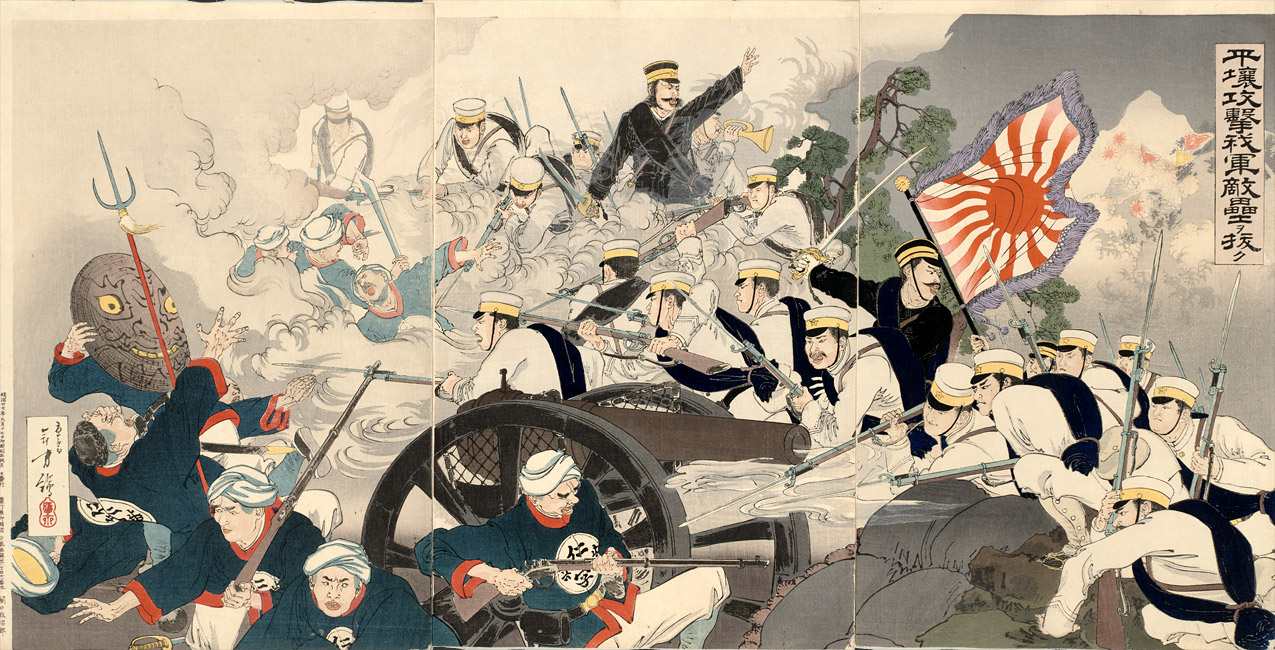
Battle of Pyongyang by Mizuno Toshikata

=== Arrival of Japanese troops ===
The Main Division attacked from the southwest early on the morning of 15 September 1894. Following a twelve-hour battle, the Chinese repulsed this force. Heavy rain turned the battlefield into a field of mud covered with the wounded, supply carts, and horses. Meanwhile, the Combined Brigade attacked the forts protecting the southern bank of the Taedong River. However, Japanese artillery was too far back to be effective and by nightfall the Japanese evacuated the few earthworks they had captured. The apparent inability of these two divisions to take Pyongyang led to initial newspaper reports that China had won the battle, which later turned out to be false.

In reality, the Wonsan and Sangnyong columns took the Chinese fortress at Moktan-tei, which was north of Pyongyang. From that position, Japanese artillery could fire across the city walls – this position forced the Chinese to surrender at 16:30 on 15 September. The Chinese commander promised that his troops would remain within the city gates, but since it was already getting dark, the Japanese declined to enter the city until the following day. During the evening of 15 September, many Chinese troops tried to flee for the coast and the border town of Wiju (modern village of Uiju, North Korea) on the lower reaches of the Yalu River). Japanese snipers killed large numbers of Chinese on the northern roads. As a result of the Chinese surrender, early the following morning the two Japanese columns entered the northern gate of the city unopposed. There was no way to communicate their success to the rest of the Japanese Army, however, so when the Main Division began its attack on the city's West Gate the next day, they were surprised to find the gate undefended. Later that morning, the Combined Brigade entered the city through the South Gate. Throughout the battle of Pyongyang, the Chinese troops were unable to counter the Japanese troops.

=== Contempraneous accounts ===
The following is public domain text out of copyright:

The Wars of the Nineties: A History of the Warfare of the Last Ten Years of the 19th Century

"Some Japanese officers left their lines and met him half-way. They found the Chinese asked for a suspension of hostilities pending an arrangement to surrender. The Japanese pointed out that this could easily be done. The Chinese had simply to lay down their arms, and the Japanese would march in and take possession. The Chinese general sent word to say that they could not very well surrender in such rainy weather. His men would get drenched, and things would be generally uncomfortable. Would they wait, say, for twelve hours? The rain might lift by then. But the Japanese would not listen further to the parley, and hostilities recommenced."

The cavalry attempted another sortie, probably in the hope of clearing a way for a general retreat. There were about five hundred of them. They rode gallantly down on Nodzu's infantry, but were swept away almost to a man by the Japanese rifles. On the north side of the city the fire had ceased from the wall, and the great gate seemed to be abandoned. But this might be only a trick of the wily Chinese, and after an attempt to open the gate from the outside, which drew fire from some of the neighbouring loopholes, a gallant soldier, a private named Hirada, volunteered to climb the wall and reconnoitre. His comrades watched him anxiously as he scrambled up the high wall beside the pagoda-crowned gateway, from which the dragon flag still flew. He found the parapet deserted, got down and unbolted the gate, and the Japanese infantry rushed in. The Chinese had retired to some houses at a distance inside the gate. They had fired at Hirada as he was opening it, and they now exchanged a sharp fire with the advancing Japanese. Beyond this point the Japanese made no progress during the afternoon; and as the walls and towers on the right and left were held by the Chinese, and they were rallying in the streets, Tachimi decided to fall back on the Peony Mount, and hold on there till the main attack had made further progress. This retirement after the gate had been forced shows that the Japanese had still a good deal of respect for their opponents. But the next day was to bring a surprise.

The cavalry attempted another sortie, probably in the hope of clearing a way for a general retreat. There were about five hundred of them. They rode gallantly down on Nodzu's infantry, but were swept away almost to a man by the Japanese rifles. On the north side of the city the fire had ceased from the wall, and the great gate seemed to be abandoned. But this might be only a trick of the wily Chinese, and after an attempt to open the gate from the outside, which drew fire from some of the neighbouring loopholes, a gallant soldier, a private named Hirada, volunteered to climb the wall and reconnoitre. His comrades watched him anxiously as he scrambled up the high wall beside the pagoda-crowned gateway, from which the dragon flag still flew. He found the parapet deserted, got down and unbolted the gate, and the Japanese infantry rushed in. The Chinese had retired to some houses at a distance inside the gate. They had fired at Hirada as he was opening it, and they now exchanged a sharp fire with the advancing Japanese. Beyond this point the Japanese made no progress during the afternoon; and as the walls and towers on the right and left were held by the Chinese, and they were rallying in the streets, Tachimi decided to fall back on the Peony Mount, and hold on there till the main attack had made further progress. This retirement after the gate had been forced shows that the Japanese had still a good deal of respect for their opponents. But the next day was to bring a surprise.

"When morning dawned," writes the correspondent we have already quoted, "Ping-yang was silent. No réveille from the Chinese lines heralded the day. Down by the western gate was a village smouldering. Here and there a hut was struggling to burst into flame, for the rain had now ceased, and the pall of smoke still hung over the valley. The soddened turf, the fields of millet, beans, and corn, wore the imprint of a great host having passed over the country. The roads, the trails through the fields, were strewn with bright and gaudy uniforms. Flags, quaint spears, curious old-time muskets, swords, pots and pans, and several curiously carved carriage chairs were sticking in the mud. The Japanese army awoke to this strange sight, rubbed its eyes and wondered, then sounded the advance, and closed upon the city. The earthworks, the redoubts, and the city itself were empty. The Chinese army had disappeared. Some 12,000 men had stolen away in the night.

"On the Japanese side 633 men had fallen in the attack. Of these, 8 officers and 154 men were killed. Oshima's brigade suffered most severely. Fully three-fourths of the loss fell upon it, and the general himself was slightly wounded."

"The collapse of the Chinese defence has been explained by two facts. In the first place the defences were on such an extensive scale that not one of them were fully manned. Instead of twelve or fourteen thousand men, the forts and lines of Ping-yang would have needed thirty-five thousand. Again, the Chinese had expended all their energy on fortifications, and made little or no effort to clear the front of their works. Trees were left standing in the dense pine woods on the ridges that came close up to the works, and thus the Japanese as they marched on the place were screened almost entirely from view, and had a good deal of cover from fire."

“The” History of China: In Two Volumes, Volume 2

The battle began at sunrise on the 15th of September with an attack on the forts held by the Chinese on the left bank of the river commanding a bridge of boats across the Taidong. Here the Chinese fought well, and repulsed the Japanese with considerable loss; but this success had no influence on the result of the day, which was being decided on another part of the scene. The attack on the forts north of the river by the two flanking columns represented the serious part of the operation. Here five forts, more or less strong by nature, and by artifice, had to be captured, and for a time the Chinese made a most vigorous resistance. The Japanese were fortunately assisted by the artillery fire they were able to direct on the interior of the forts from a hill they had succeeded in capturing the night before. Aided by this advantage the Japanese succeeded in capturing the fort on Peony Hill, and the death of the Chinese general Tso-pao-kuei, who fought when wounded with a noble heroism to the last, shook the confidence of the whole Chinese army.

The Flowery Kingdom and the Land of the Mikado, Or China, Japan and Corea Containing Their Complete History Down to the Present Time, [etc., Etc.]: Together with a Graphic Account of the War Between China and Japan, Its Causes, Land and Naval Battles, Etc., Etc

The Chinese troops, in the meanwhile, were entirely ignorant of any advance of the Japanese forces from either the rear or flanks until the actual engagement had begun, and the Japanese armies were within one hundred yards of their various strongholds.

Now the Japanese charged upon the hillside forts, but the Chinese used their Krupps and Gatling guns with great effectiveness, and Major Tatemi quickly divided his detachment which had undertaken the charges into two swings. As they neared the fort, the Chinese fire ceased, but when the Japanese troops had reached the walls the Chinese stormed out upon them with a desperation born of despair, and a terrible hand-to-hand encounter ensued

Desperate Fighting.

The mixed division in the meanwhile had formed into three wings-a right, left and central. They had hastily thrown up earthworks, but abandoned these to advance on the Chinese positions. The fighting was desperate; those killed and wounded among the enemy seemed innumerable, while every officer of the second and fourth detachments of the Japanese forces of this division were killed.

The earthworks of the Chinese were strongly manned and armed with rapid firing guns, which they used with terrible affectiveness. The fighting continued uninterruptedly for some time, when the ammunition of the Japanese gave out, and the division was on the verge of a retreat.

== Aftermath ==
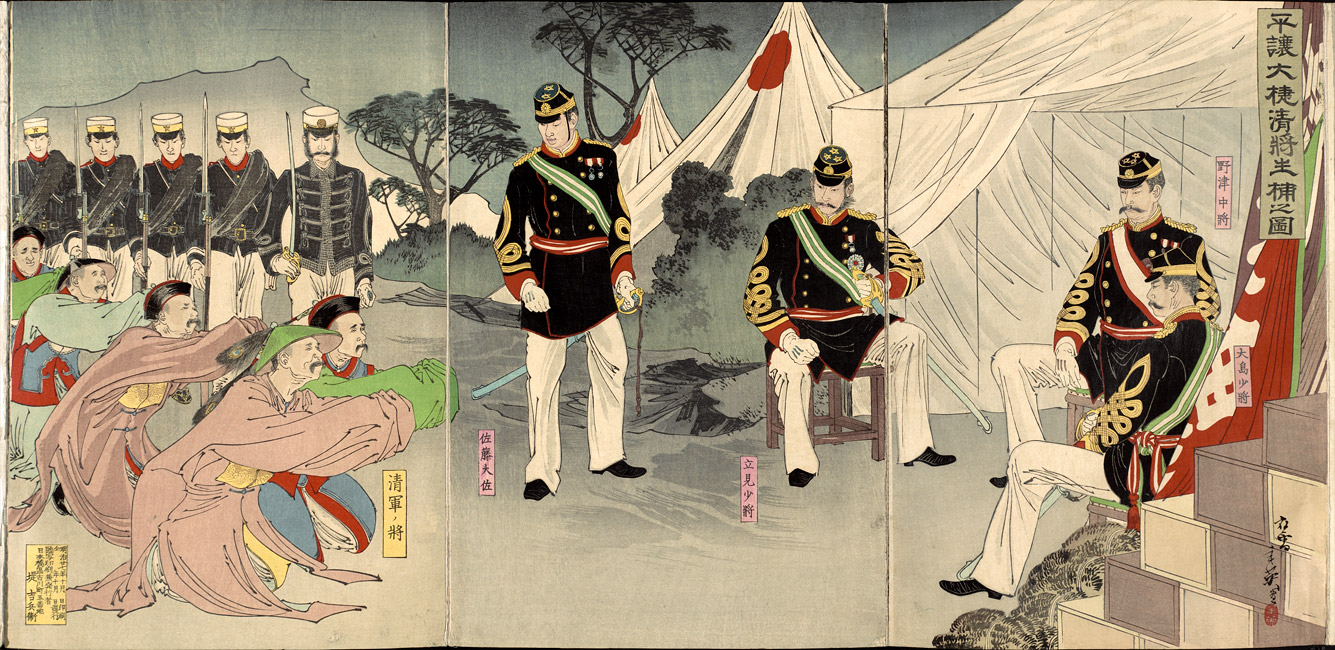
Inaccurate depiction of the surrender of Chinese generals

After the Battle of Pyongyang, command of Japanese First Army was turned over from Marshal Yamagata to General Nozu for reasons of health. Nozu's former command of the 5th division was assumed by Lieutenant General Oku Yasukata. The Japanese advanced north to the Yalu River without opposition. The Chinese had decided (as would the Russians ten years later in the Russo-Japanese War) to abandon northern Korea and defend from the northern bank of the Yalu River.

The Huai Army of Viceroy Li Hongzhang, representing China's best troops, took heavy losses and was nearly destroyed, which also damaged the viceroy's personal power base.

Qing Muslim General Zuo Baogui (1837–1894), from Shandong province, died in action in Pyongyang, from Japanese artillery. A memorial to him was constructed. Before the battle Zuo Baogui performed ablution (Wudu or Ghusl) according to Islamic custom.

== See also ==
- Harada Jūkichi

== Bibliography ==
- Fung, Allen (1996). "Testing the Self-Strengthening: The Chinese Army in the Sino-Japanese War of 1894–1895". Modern Asian Studies. 40 (3): 1026.
- Ogawa, Kazumasa (1894). Nisshin Sensō shashinzu: A photographic Album of the Japan–China War (PDF). pp. 133–138.
- Elleman, Bruce A. (2001). Modern Chinese Warfare, 1795–1989. Routledge. ISBN 978-0-415-21474-2.
- Jowett, Philip (2013). China's Wars: Rousing the Dragon 1894–1949. Bloomsbury Publishing. ISBN 978-1-47280-673-4.
- Olender, Piotr (2014). Sino-Japanese Naval War 1894–1895. MMPBooks. ISBN 978-83-63678-30-2.
- Paine, S.C.M (2003). The Sino-Japanese War of 1894–1895: Perception, Power, and Primacy. Cambridge University Press. ISBN 0-521-81714-5.
