= Japanese invasions of Korea =

Japanese invasions of Korea may refer to:

- Japanese invasions of Korea (1592–1598)
- Donghak Peasant Revolution
  - Japanese occupation of Gyeongbokgung
- Korea under Japanese rule
