= Japanese cruiser Yoshino =

Imperial Japanese Navy protected cruiser

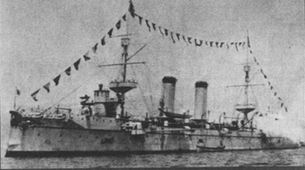
- Yoshino in 1893

History

Empire of Japan
- Name: Yoshino
- Ordered: 1891 Fiscal Year
- Builder: Armstrong Whitworth, United Kingdom
- Yard number: 596
- Laid down: February 1892
- Launched: 20 December 1892
- Completed: 30 September 1893
- Fate: Sunk after collision, 15 May 1904

General characteristics
- Type: Protected cruiser
- Displacement: 4,150 long tons (4,217 t)
- Length: 109.72 m (360 ft 0 in) w/l
- Beam: 14.17 m (46 ft 6 in)
- Draft: 5.18 m (17 ft 0 in)
- Propulsion: 2-shaft VTE reciprocating engines, 12 boilers, 15,000 hp (11,000 kW), 1000 tons coal
- Speed: 23 knots (26 mph; 43 km/h)
- Range: 9,000 nmi (17,000 km) at 10 kn (12 mph; 19 km/h)
- Complement: 360
- Armament: 4 × QF 6 inch /40 naval gun; 8 × QF 4.7 inch Gun Mk I–IV quick-firing guns; 22 × QF 3 pounder Hotchkiss; 5 × 356 mm (14.0 in) torpedo tubes
- Armor: Deck: 115 mm (4.5 in) (slope), 45 mm (1.8 in) (flat); Gun shield: 115 mm (4.5 in) (front)

Yoshino (吉野) was a protected cruiser of the Imperial Japanese Navy. Yoshino is sometimes regarded as a sister ship to Takasago, although the two vessels are of different classes. The name Yoshino comes from the Yoshino mountains, located in the southern portion of Nara prefecture. She played an important role in the First Sino-Japanese War, but was sunk in the Russo-Japanese War after being rammed by the Japanese armored cruiser Kasuga in dense fog.

== Background ==
Yoshino was an improved design of the Argentine Navy cruiser Veinticinco de Mayo designed by Sir Philip Watts, and built by the Armstrong Whitworth shipyards in Elswick, in the United Kingdom. Watts was also responsible for the design of the cruiser Izumi and the Naniwa-class cruisers. When commissioned, Yoshino was the largest ship in the Imperial Japanese Navy, and was also the fastest cruiser in the world when she entered service.

== Design ==
Yoshino was a typical Elswick cruiser design, with a steel housing, divided into waterproof compartments, a low forecastle, twin funnels, and two masts. The prow was reinforced for ramming. The power plant was a triple expansion reciprocating steam engine with four cylindrical boilers, driving two screws.

The main armament of Yoshino consisted of four separate Elswick QF 6 inch /40 naval guns behind gun shields, which were placed as bow and stern guns and in sponsons near the bridge. Secondary armament consisted of eight Elswick QF 4.7 inch Gun Mk I–IV quick-firing guns mounted on the sides of the hull and 22 QF 3 pounder Hotchkiss guns.

== Service record ==
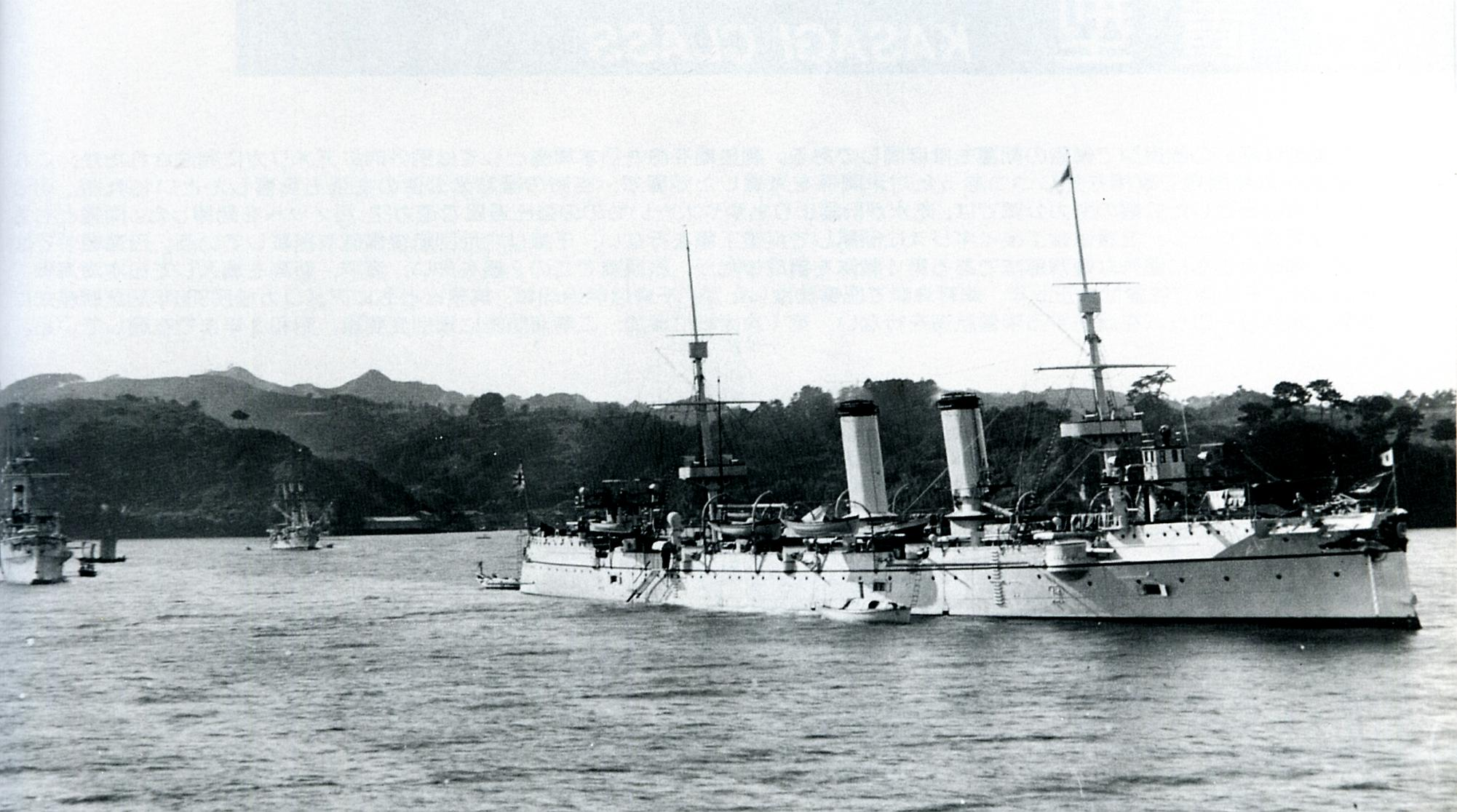
At Yokosuka in 1896

Yoshino was laid down in February 1892, launched on 20 December 1892 and completed on 30 September 1893. Soon after being placed into service, Yoshino was assigned to patrol duties off of the coast of Korea due to increasing tension between the Empire of Japan and the Empire of China.

=== First Sino-Japanese War ===
On 25 July 1894, Yoshino, Akitsushima and Naniwa, met two Chinese ships off the Korean coast in the Yellow Sea. The Beiyang Fleet cruiser Jiyuan and gunboat Guangyi had sortied from Asan to meet another Chinese gunboat, Caojiang and the leased transport Kowshing transporting 1,100 troops and supplies as reinforcements to the Chinese garrison in Korea. Although not at war, the Japanese and Chinese squadrons exchanged gunfire in what was later called the Battle of Pungdo, with Guangyi driven onto rocks and destroyed, Caojiang captured, and Jiyuan taking considerable damage before retreating. Yoshino despite its vaunted superior speed, was unable to catch Jiyuan before it disappeared into a fog bank. The transport Kowshing was sunk by Naniwa during the battle.

After the formal declaration of hostilities, Yoshino continued to participate in the First Sino-Japanese War, including the Battle of the Yellow Sea on 17 September 1894. Yoshino served as flagship for Japanese Admiral Tsuboi Kōzō in a flying squadron which included Takachiho, Naniwa and Akitsushima. During the battle, Yoshino assisted in sinking the Beiyang Fleet cruisers Jingyuan and Zhiyuan and severely damaging Laiyuan.

Later, Yoshino was among the Japanese fleet units that took part in the invasion of Taiwan, and bombarded Cihou Fort, part of the coastal defences of Kaohsiung on 13 October 1895. Future admiral Yashiro Rokurō served on Yoshino during this campaign as a lieutenant.

=== Russo-Japanese War ===
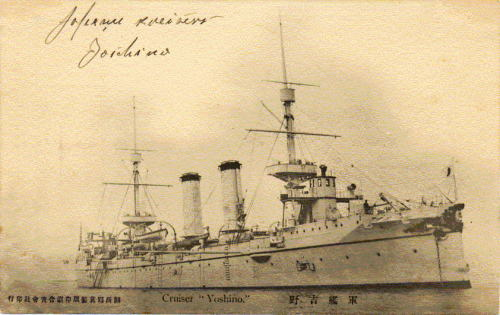
1905 postcard

With the start of the Russo-Japanese War of 1904-1905, Yoshino participated in the naval Battle of Port Arthur. However, soon after the start of the war, Yoshino collided with the Japanese armored cruiser Kasuga in dense fog. Kasuga's ram hit Yoshino's port side, and penetrated to the engine room; Yoshino turned turtle and sank in the Yellow Sea at (38°07′N 122°33′E) on 15 May 1904 with the loss of 319 lives. Only 19 of the crew managed to survive.

As a result of this accident, the Imperial Japanese Navy removed the rams from the bows of all its warships.
