= Jūkichi =

- Gender: Male

Origin
- Origin: Japanese
- Meaning: Different meanings depending on the kanji used

Jūkichi, Jukichi or Juukichi (written: 重吉) is a masculine Japanese given name. Notable people with the name include:

- Harada Jūkichi (原田 重吉; 1868–1938), Japanese farmer and soldier
- Oguri Jukichi (小栗 重吉; 1785–1852), Japanese castaway
- Jūkichi Uno (宇野 重吉; 1914–1988), Japanese actor
- Jūkichi Yagi (八木 重吉; 1898–1927), Japanese poet
