= Zuo Baogui =

Qing dynasty person

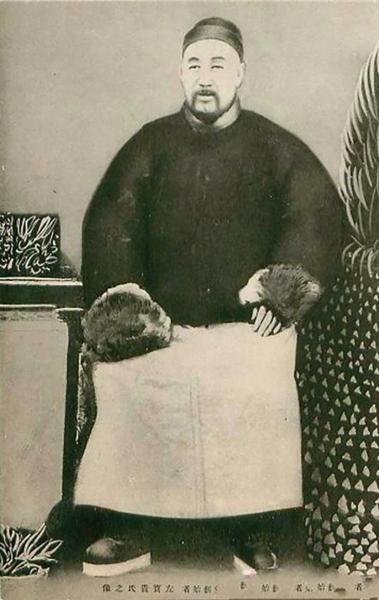
Zuo Baogui

Zuo Baogui (Chinese: 左寶貴; 18 October 1837 – 15 September 1894) was a Chinese Hui Muslim general during the Qing Dynasty who fought in the First Sino-Japanese War. He was killed in action by the Japanese Army during the Battle of Pyongyang in 1894. It was reported that the Muslim troops under his command fought well until his death in an artillery strike. A memorial was later constructed in his honor.

== Sources ==
=== Books ===
- Lynn, Aliya Ma (2007). Muslims in China. Vol. 3 of Asian Studies. University Press. ISBN 978-0-88093-861-7.
- Paine, S.C.M (2003). The Sino-Japanese War of 1894–1895: Perception, Power, and Primacy. Cambridge University Press. ISBN 0-521-81714-5.
