= Japanese occupation of Gyeongbokgung =

1894 Japanese Army-Korean battle

Japanese occupation of Gyeongbokgung Palace
- Part of Donghak Peasant Revolution and the First Sino-Japanese War
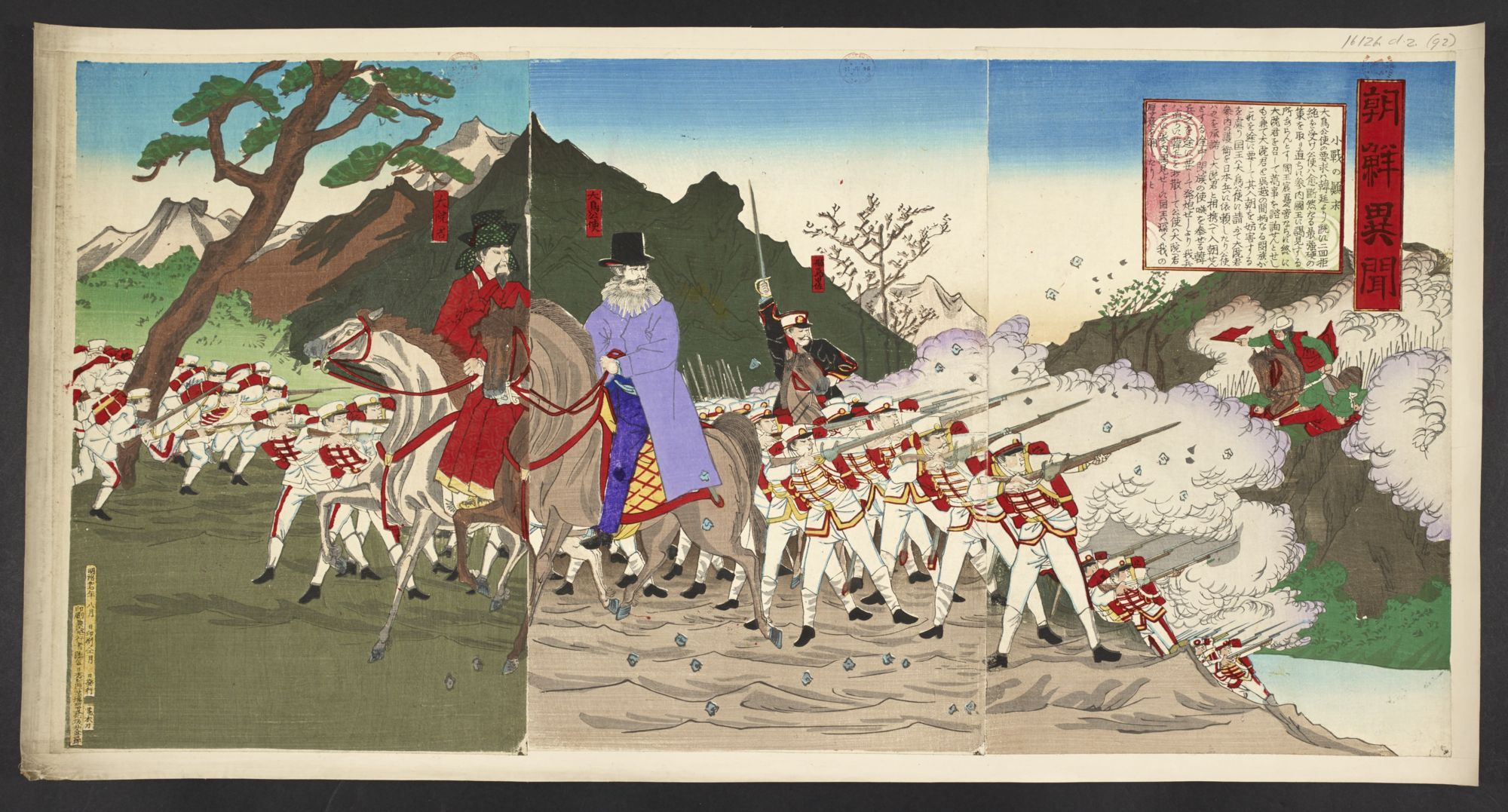
- Ōtori Keisuke escorts Daewongun to the royal palace as Ōshima Yoshimasa engages the palace garrisons
Date	23 July 1894
Location	Gyeongbokgung Palace, Seoul, Korea
Result	Japanese victory: Restoration of Heungseon Daewongun; Establishment of a pro-Japanese government under Kim Hong-jip and the Enlightenment Party's administration; Beginning of the Gabo Reform; Beginning of the Battle of Seonghwan

Belligerents
Japan; Japanese Army; Enlightenment Party	Korea; Joseon Army

Commanders and leaders
Ōtori Keisuke; Ōshima Yoshimasa; Heungseon Daewongun; Kim Hong-jip	Gojong; Myeongseong; Hong Gye-hun

Strength
IJA 9th Infantry Brigade (Oshima Composite Brigade): 8,000	Chingunyeong (Capital Guards Command): 5,000

Casualties and losses
10 casualties	30 casualties

- Japanese occupation of Gyeongbokgung
- Hangul: 일본군의 경복궁 점령
- Hanja: 日本軍의 景福宮 占領
- Revised Romanization: Ilbongunui Gyeongbokgung jeomnyeong
- McCune–Reischauer: Ilbon'gunŭi Kyŏngbokkung chŏmnyŏng

The Japanese occupation of Gyeongbokgung Palace (Korean: 일본군의 경복궁 점령) or the Gabo Incident occurred on 23 July 1894, during the ceasefire of the Donghak Peasant Revolution and the beginning of the First Sino-Japanese War. Imperial Japanese forces led by Japanese Minister Plenipotentiary to Korea Ōtori Keisuke and Ōshima Yoshimasa occupied Gyeongbokgung palace to restore King Gojong's father Heungseon Daewongun and establish a pro-Japanese government under Kim Hong-jip and the Enlightenment Party's administration.

== Background ==
On 1 June 1894, rumors reached the Donghaks that the Chinese and Japanese were on the verge of sending troops, and so the rebels agreed to a ceasefire with the Joseon government to remove any grounds for foreign intervention. On 2 June, the Japanese cabinet decided to send troops to Korea if China did the same. In May, the Chinese took steps to prepare for the mobilization of their forces in the provinces of Zhili, Shandong, and Manchuria. However, those actions were planned more as an armed demonstration to strengthen the Chinese position in Korea than as preparation for war against Japan. On 3 June, King Gojong, on the recommendation of the Min clan and at the insistence of Yuan Shikai, requested aid from the Chinese government in suppressing the Donghak Rebellion. Although the rebellion was not as serious as it had initially seemed and so the Chinese forces were not necessary, the Qing government decided to send 2,500 men under the command of General Ye Zhichao to the harbor of Asan, about 70 km (43 mi) from Seoul. The troops destined for Korea sailed onboard three British-owned steamers chartered by the Chinese government, arriving at Asan on 9 June. On 25 June, an additional 400 troops had arrived. Consequently, Ye Zhichao had about 2,800–2,900 soldiers under his command at Asan by the end of June.

Closely watching the events on the peninsula, the Japanese government had quickly become convinced that the rebellion would lead to Chinese intervention in Korea. As a result, soon after learning of the Korean government's request for Chinese military help, all Japanese warships in the vicinity were immediately ordered to Pusan and Chemulpo. By 9 June, Japanese warships had consecutively called at Chemulpo and Pusan. A formation of 420 sailors, selected from the crews of warships anchored in Chempulo, was immediately dispatched to Seoul, where they served as a temporary counterbalance to the Chinese troops camped at Asan. Simultaneously, a reinforced brigade of approximately 8,000 soldiers of the IJA 9th Infantry Brigade, also known as the Oshima Composite Brigade, under the command of General Ōshima Yoshimasa, was also dispatched to Chemulpo by 27 June and then to Yongsan.

According to the Japanese, the Chinese government had violated the Convention of Tientsin by not informing the Japanese government before sending troops to Korea. The Chinese claimed that Japan had approved the decision. The Japanese countered by sending an expeditionary force to Korea. The first 400 troops arrived on 9 June en route to Seoul, and 3,000 landed at Incheon on 12 June. However, Japanese officials denied any intention to intervene. As a result, the Qing viceroy Li Hongzhang "was lured into believing that Japan would not wage war, but the Japanese prepared to act." The Qing government turned down Japan's suggestion for Japan and China to co-operate to reform the Korean government. Japanese Minister Plenipotentiary to Korea Ōtori Keisuke requested Gojong establish an electric cable between Hanseong and Busan for military use and a barracks to house their troops. They also demanded the withdrawal of Qing troops and cancellation of the China–Korea Treaty of 1882 and other trade agreements concluded between them. The Joseon government rejected their requests and demanded Japan and the Qing withdraw their troops, proclaiming that they would push for reforms without them. They established the Gyojeongcheong or the Board of Review and Rectification to carry out their program of reforms.

== Battle ==
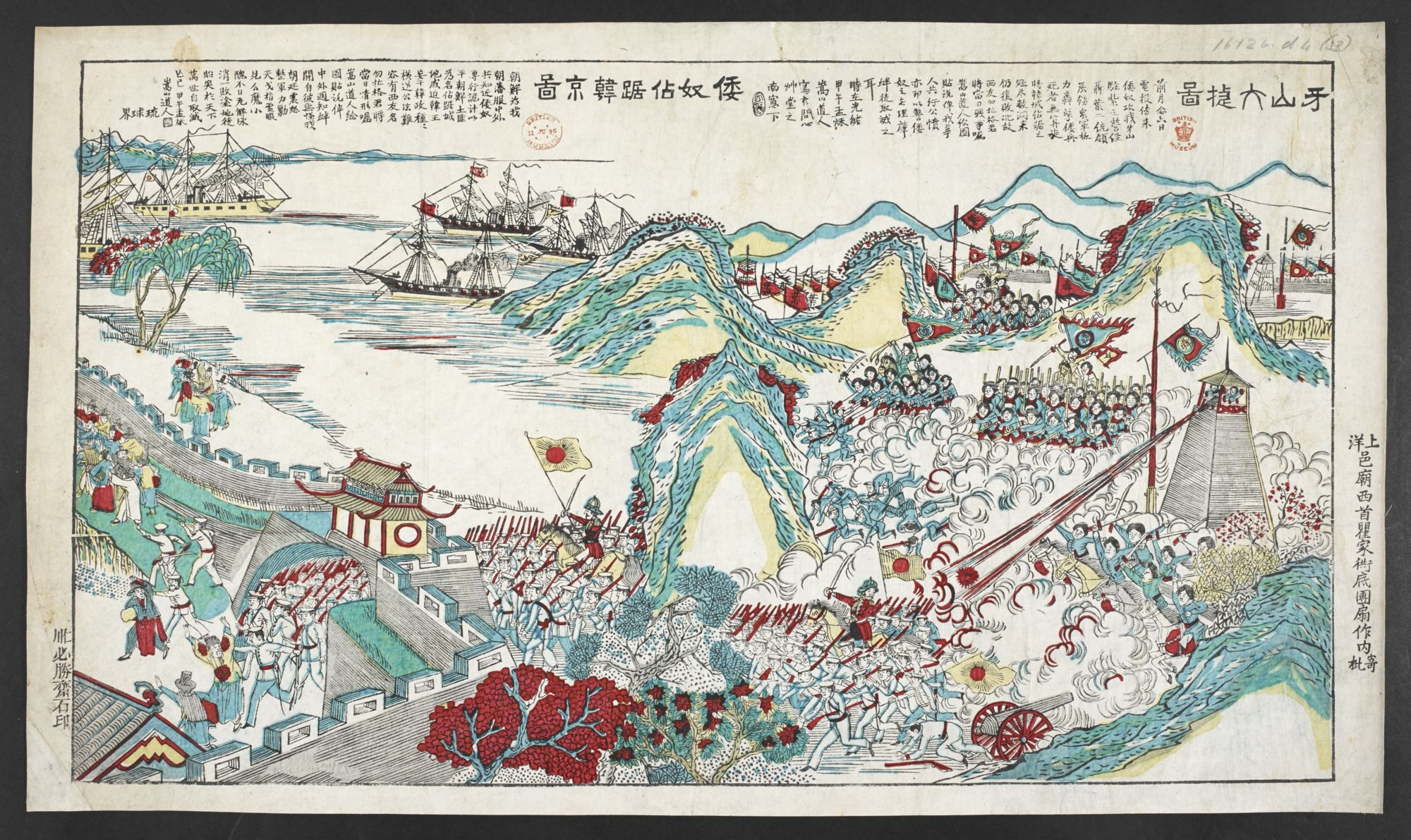
Japanese troops storm the palace capturing King Gojong (bottom left) and the queen consort while the rest of their army engages the Qing at Seonghwan, Korea.

=== Preparations ===
On 22 July, at around 10:00 pm at the Japanese Legation, Otori ordered Ōshima and his IJA 9th Infantry Brigade to march to Hansŏng and surround the Gyeongbokgung palace. According to the intelligence secured by the Japanese army, most of the Joseon Army and police force in Hanyang went down to suppress the Donghak Peasant Movement, so it was expected that there would be only a few royal guards guarding Gyeongbokgung, but many of the Capital Guards Command (친군영; 親軍營; Chingunyeong) troops were stationed in various parts of Seoul. The strategy was for the 11th Regiment to occupy Dongdaemun, Gwanghuimun, and Dongbukmun city gates of Hanyang and patrol and guard the city. Then 1,000 soldiers of the 21st Regiment would break into Gyeongbokgung Palace to secure King Gojong and subdue the Joseon army.

On 23 July, the Japanese approached Heungseon Daewongun, who was under house arrest Gojong had placed him as someone amenable to be Korea's leader in growing their sphere of influence on Joseon. He agreed on the condition that "Japan will not demand a single piece of Korean territory if the reforms succeed," and so the Japanese liberated him.

=== Assault on the palace ===
At 4:30 am, Otori ordered Ōshima Yoshimasa to "execute as planned!" The 21st regiment besieged the palace. King Gojong and Queen Myeongseong awoke from the sudden attack; they took refuge in Hamhwadang Hall at Geoncheong Palace, a separate palace to the north of the Hyangwonji Pong in Gyeongbokgung.

The 1st Battalion fired on the Geonchunmun, the Eastern Gate, and the Gwanghwamun, the Main Gate, defended by the Strong Defense Garrison (장위영; 壯衛營; Jang Wi-yeong) led by Lieutenant Colonel Hong Gye-hun. By attacking the two gates in full force, they were forcing the Koreans to redirect their forces away from Yeongchumun, the West Gate, and Sinmumun, the North gate. Major Keizo Yamaguchi led the 2nd Battalion against 500 Mounted Guard Infantry (기영병; 箕營兵; Giyeongbyeong) from Pyeongyang defending Yeongchumun and Sinmumun armed with Mauser Model 1871 rifles. The Mounted Guard Infantry fiercely defended the gates, but they were outnumbered by about four times as many regular Japanese troops. Yamaguchi ordered his engineers from the 7th Company to destroy the Yeongchumun Gate with explosives, but the gate was too strong, and they had to cut it down with axes.

At 5 am, Yamaguchi and the 2nd Battalion finally broke through Yeongchumun Gate. Then the 1st Battalion broke through Sinmumun and Gwanghwamun and destroyed Geonchunmun gates with explosives. They entered the palace gates and hung a long flag pole on the wall. The Japanese forced the Strong Defense Garrison and Mounted Guard Infantry to hide behind the pine trees and the palace walls to the left of Gwanghwamun, cutting them off from reinforcements. The guards were eventually overcome by superior Japanese numbers. The blood that flowed from the bullet holes in the bodies of the Joseon soldiers was said to lie red under the July morning sun. Yamaguchi detoured to the east, and west sides of Gyeongbokgung Palace rendezvoused with the troops who entered through Sinmumun to secure Hamhwadang residence. On arrival, he drew his sword, forcing Gojong to come out whilst claiming to protect him. At 7:30 am, Gojong commanded his guards to stop fighting. The Mounted Guards Infantry defending Yeongchumun surrendered 30 minutes later.

=== Outside the palace ===
Fighting did not immediately stop after the surrender of King Gojong. At around 3 pm, the Unified Defense Guards (통위영; 統衛營; Tong Ui-yeong) near Dongdaemun engaged the 11th Regiment, and a fierce firefight ensued. Around 5 pm, the 11th Regiment occupied the right and left flanks of the Metropolitan Guards. The Logistical Support Guards (경리청; 經理廳; Gyeongricheong) defending the outskirts of Hanyang and Bukhansanseong Fortress heard about the attack and mobilized field artillery, police, and cavalry to surround the palace. However, Joseon's diplomat Kim Ga-jin and Enlightenment Party member Ahn Kyung-soo wrote a fake order in the king's name and ordered Hong Gye-Hun to disarm the Joseon Army. They sent messengers to all the Capital Guard units ordering them to lay down their weapons. They received the king's command to surrender to the Japanese army, but some disbanded themselves.

== Aftermath ==
=== Munitions ===
The Japanese captured the armory storing 3,000 rifles, including Mausers, Remingtons, and Martinis, 8 Gatling guns, 20 artillery pieces, and horses. The Japanese kept the weapons to fight the Donghak and the Qing, while some transported the weapons to Japan over 2 days. Some were dumped into the pond at Hyangwonjeong by way of destroying them. The guards wept at the surrender while the Japanese disarmed them. Some of the guards tore up their uniforms and dismantled their weapons on their own. The Mounted Guard Infantry dispersed and returned to Pyongyang.

=== Enlightenment Party government ===
Daewongun entered the palace under guard. On 25 July, King Gojong summoned Minister Ōtori to the court to announce his surrender of political control to his father, while acting in consultation with him. Daewongun and the Japanese replaced the existing Korean government with a pro-Japanese government administered by the Enlightenment Party with Kim Hong-jip as prime minister in order to begin the Gabo Reform. Their first acts were to disband the Capital Guards Garrison, expel Qing forces, and request Japan to dispatch more troops to Korea.

=== First Sino-Japanese War and Korean independence from China ===
Even though Qing forces were in the process of leaving Korea because they had not been needed there, the Qing Government rejected the new Korean government. Because the Qing Government did not inform the Japanese government of the King's request for aid, the Japanese started preparations to expel the Qing forces at Asan, leading to the Battle of Seonghwan of the First Sino-Japanese War which they won. Japan won the war, and China signed the Treaty of Shimonoseki in 1895. The treaty forced the Qing to recognize "the complete independence and autonomy of Korea," thus ending Korea's tributary relationship with the Chinese Qing Dynasty and achieving its independence in 1895.

=== Fate of Kim Hong-jip's administration ===
The Japanese, however, became nervous after placing the Daewongun in charge, as he seemed interested "only in grasping power and purging his opponents and did not see the need for a reform policy." By September 1894, the Japanese decided that the Daewongun was not to be trusted. By early October, it became clear that "the plan to use the Taewongun [Daewongun] as a vehicle for the reform program had misfired." A Japanese statesman, Inoue Kaoru, was sent to Korea as the new resident minister, where he told the Daewongun, "You always stand in the way," and forced the Daewongun to promise that he would "abstain from interference in political affairs." Kim Hong-jip's administration made sweeping progressive reforms despite cynicism from Daewongun. They made reforms such as abolishing Joseon's caste system and the Gwageo, and prohibiting topknots through the new organization, the Gungukkimucheo.

Constant infighting with cabinet members such as Park Young-hyo and changing involvement of the Japanese and the Russians caused the collapse of the Enlightenment Party, and the Gungukkimucheo and his cabinet to collapse and then reestablish and change members four times. After the assassination of Queen Min and Gojong's internal exile to the Russian legation, Gojong ordered the arrest of pro-Japanese officials, causing the Gabo reform to end from 1894 to 1896, and the death and dismemberment of Kim Hong-jip.

== Cultural references ==
- 2018 Nokdu Flower (Korean Drama)

== See also ==
- Donghak Peasant Revolution
- First Sino-Japanese War
- Eulmi Incident
