= Wei Rugui =

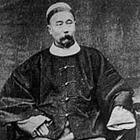
Wei Rugui

Wei Rugui (Chinese: 衛汝貴; Wade–Giles: Wei Ju-kui; 1836 – 16 January 1895) was a Han Chinese general of the late Qing dynasty who fought in the First Sino-Japanese War. He took part in the Battle of Pyongyang in 1894, and subsequently lost another couple thousand troops on the retreat north. He later abandoned Port Arthur when it was taken by the advancing Imperial Japanese Army. Wei Rugui was subsequently executed for his failures in January 1895.

== Sources ==
=== Books ===
- Paine, S.C.M (2003). The Sino-Japanese War of 1894–1895: Perception, Power, and Primacy. Cambridge University Press. ISBN 0-521-81714-5.
