= Harada Jūkichi =

Japanese farmer and soldier

- 原田 重吉
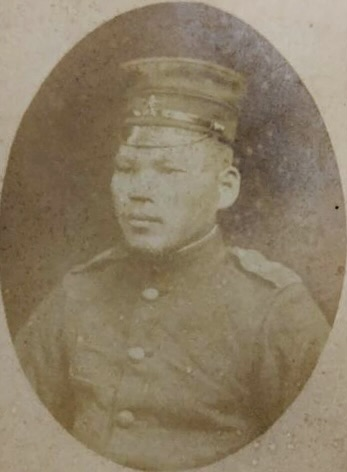

Personal details
- Born: November 23, 1868 Hiaki Village, Mikawa Province, Japan
- Died: August 6, 1938 (aged 69) Yoshisaka Village, Aichi Prefecture, Japan

Military service
- Allegiance: Imperial Japanese Army
- Years of service: 1888–1905
- Battles/wars: First Sino-Japanese War; Battle of Pyongyang; Russo-Japanese War

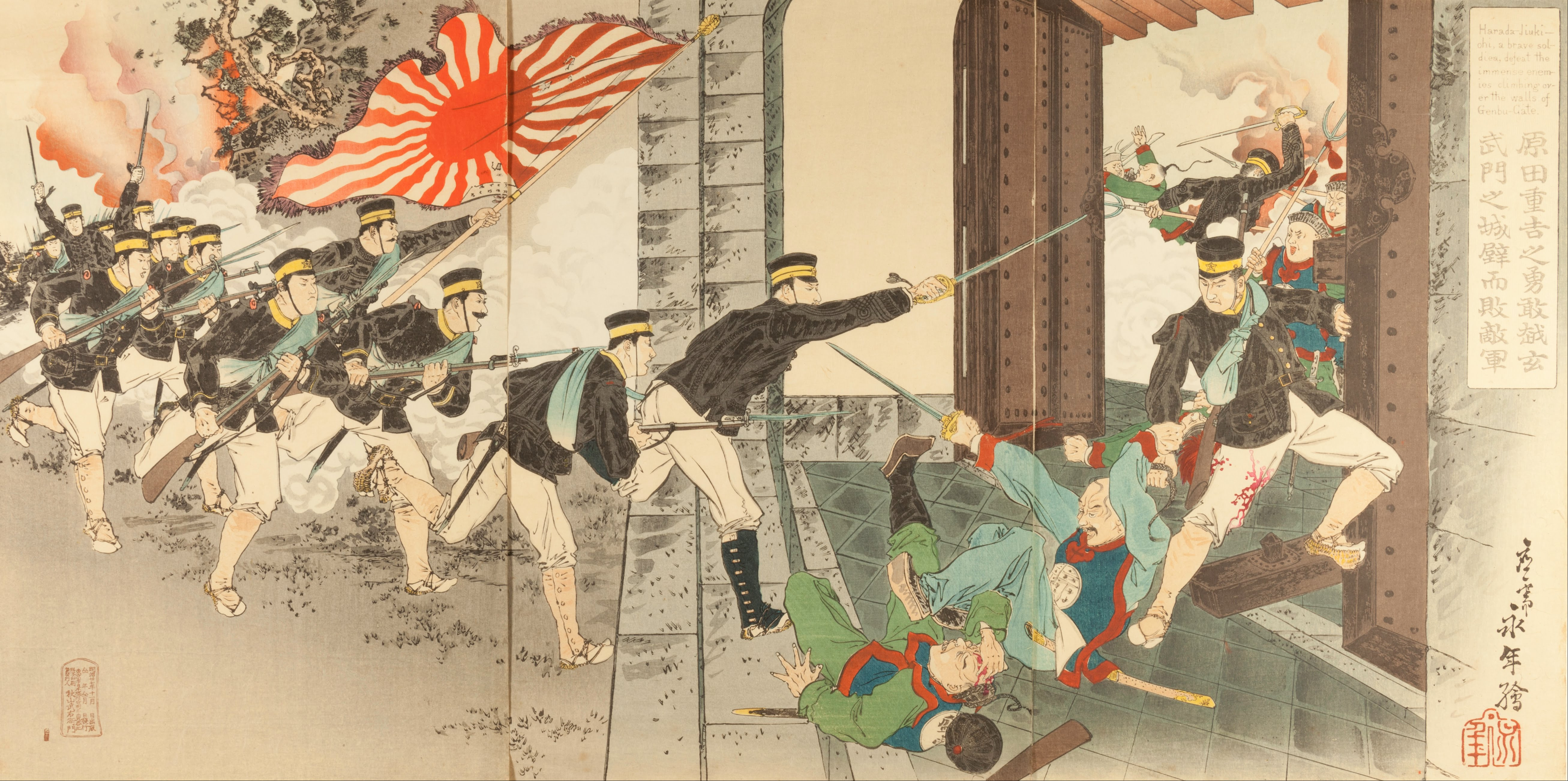
Harada Jūkichi at Pyongyang, by Nawa Nagatoshi.

Harada Jūkichi (原田 重吉, Jūkichi Harada; November 23, 1868 – August 6, 1938) was a Japanese farmer and soldier who became famous for his actions in the First Sino-Japanese War. Some sources record his given name with the spelling Jūkichi (十吉).

== Biography ==
Jūkichi was born the second son of Harada Kōkichi (原田 幸吉), a farmer in the village of Hiaki (日明), Mikawa Province. In 1888, he passed the standard conscription examination and was assigned to the 18th Infantry Regiment based in Toyohashi.

In 1894, the Sino-Japanese War broke out, and Jūkichi was called up to participate in the Battle of Pyongyang. On September 15, the order was given to attack Pyongyang in full force, and his regiment approached the heavily fortified Hyeonmu Gate (玄武門).

The Japanese force tasked with assaulting the gate found itself outnumbered and immobilized by Chinese suppression fire. Jūkichi was selected as one of a 13-member forlorn hope charged with climbing the walls. Once inside, Jūkichi and his team were engaged by numerous Chinese warriors. Fending them off, Jūkichi himself opened the Hyeonmu Gate and thereby admitted the Japanese into the city. Pyongyang quickly fell as the Chinese forces within the city routed.

Jūkichi's activities became known in Japan through various forms of media including newspapers and popular songs. At the time, he was regarded as a national hero. Jūkichi received a modest promotion to private, first class (上等兵, jotōhei) as well as the Order of the Golden Kite, seventh class.

In 1895, at the end of the war, Jūkichi returned home and soon found himself in debt. In order to pay off his debts, he cooperated with a showman in Nagoya who staged performances of the battle of the Hyeonmu Gate. The play was well received in many places, and there even appeared another show featuring a different person impersonating Jūkichi. After he finished paying off his debts, he quit acting and went back to farming. In 1904, he was called up to fight in the Russo-Japanese War, and returned to Japan in 1905.

Returning to his hometown, Jūkichi devoted the remainder of his life to agriculture. He developed his own fertilizer based on rice hull ash and managed to double the harvest of rice and wheat. For this, he received commendations from the governor of Aichi Prefecture and the prefectural agricultural association in 1923 and 1924. He died in 1938 at the age of 69.

== See also ==
- Kiguchi Kohei
- Tachibana Shūta
