= Battle of Seonghwan =

1894 battle between Japan and Qing China

- Part of the First Sino-Japanese War
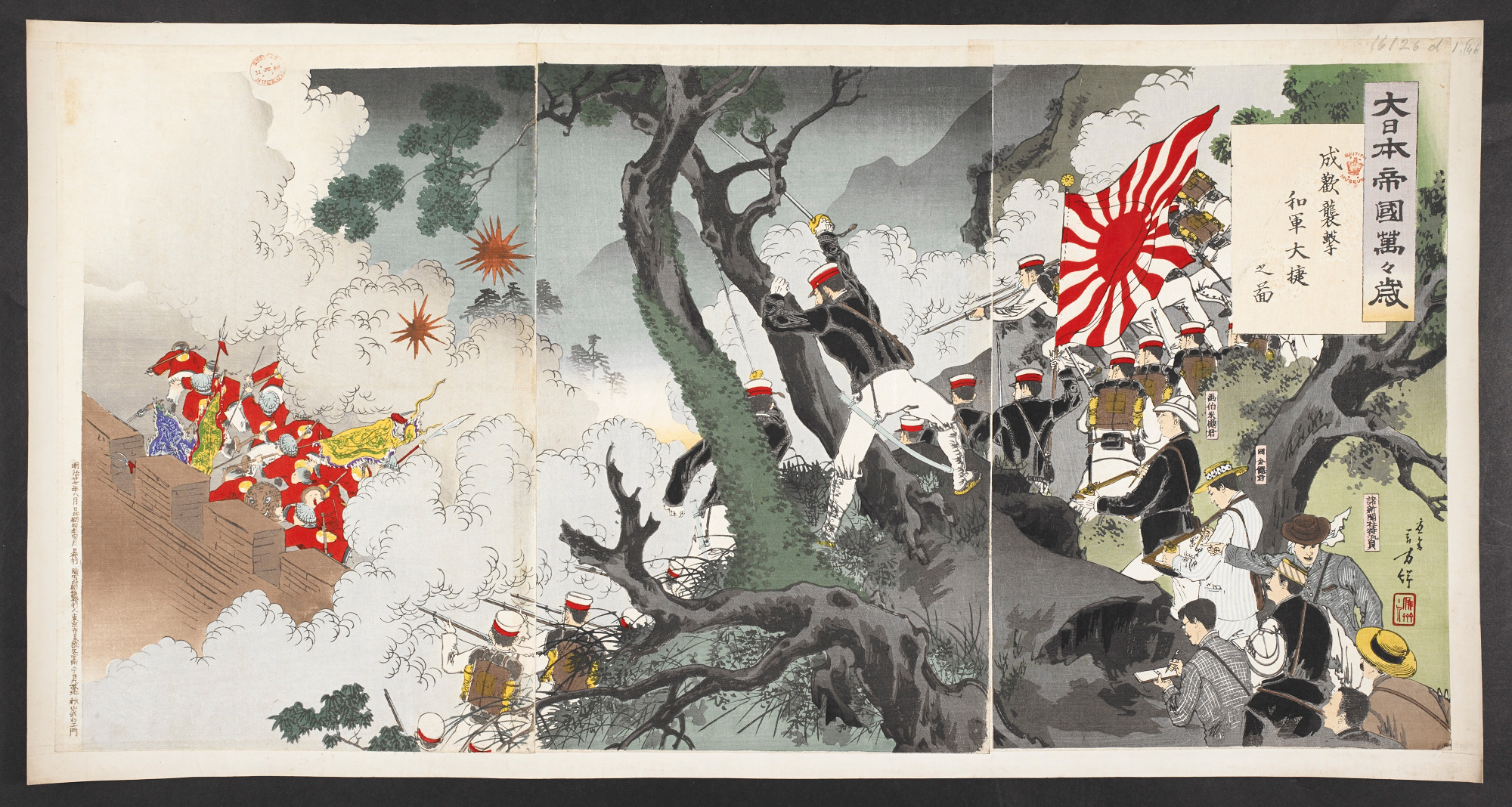
- Long live the Great Japanese Empire! Our army's victorious attack on Seonghwan, Mizuno Toshikata
Date	28–29 July 1894
Location	Cheonan, Korea 36°54′37″N 127°07′15″E
Result	Japanese victory

Belligerents
Japan	China

Commanders and leaders
Ōshima Yoshimasa	Ye Zhichao

Strength
4,000; 4 guns	3,880

Casualties and losses
88 killed & wounded	500 killed & wounded
- Battle of Seonghwan within Korea

The Battle of Seonghwan (成歓の戦い) was the first major land battle of the First Sino-Japanese War. It took place on 29 July 1894 at the hamlet of Seonghwan, outside of Cheonan, Chungcheongnam-do Korea between the forces of Meiji Japan and Qing China. It is also referred to as the Battle of Asan (Japanese: 牙山作戦 ).

== Background ==
Following the capture of the Royal Palace at Seoul and disarmament of the Korean troops, the Japanese began preparations for an attack against Chinese forces camped at Asan. On 25 July, charged with implementing the Imperial Japanese Army's commission from new Korean government to expel the Chinese Beiyang Army from Korean territory by force, a detachment of the Japanese First Army consisting of 4,000 men and four artillery pieces under command of Major General Ōshima Yoshimasa marched south from Seoul towards the major port city of Asan.

The Chinese forces stationed near Seonghwan numbered about 3,880 men under General Ye Zhichao, and had anticipated the impending arrival of the Japanese by fortifying their position with trenches, earthworks including six redoubts protected by abatis and by flooding surrounding rice fields. However, expected Chinese reinforcements from Taku, had been lost in the naval Battle of Pungdo on 25 July 1894, in which the British-chartered transport Kowshing had been sunk. Units of the Chinese main force were deployed east and north-east of Asan, near the main road leading to Seoul, the key positions held by the Chinese were the towns of Seonghwan and Cheonan. Approximately 3,000 troops were stationed at Seonghwan, while 1,000 men along with General's headquarters were at the Cheonan. The remaining Chinese troops were garrisoned in Asan itself. The Chinese had been preparing for a pincer movement against the Korean capital by massing troops at Pyongyang in the north and Asan in the south.

== Battle ==
The Japanese began their attack with a small diversionary force consisting of four companies of infantry and one of engineers attacking Chinese positions on the night of 28 July 1894 from the front, while the main force of nine companies of infantry, one of cavalry and a battalion of artillery successfully outflanked the Chinese defenses by crossing the Ansong River. The battle lasted from about 03:30 to 05:30 in the early morning of 28 July 1894. The defenders, after a sharp engagement, were unable to hold Seonghwan, and fled to Asan, ten miles to the southwest, leaving behind a considerable amount of weapons and stores.

The Japanese forces pursued the Chinese to the city of Asan, but the surprise defeat at Seonghwan had a strong impact on Chinese morale, and the Japanese took Asan with relatively little resistance by 15:00 on 29 July 1894. Surviving Chinese forces fled towards Pyongyang, which it reached after a heavy march of 26 days, detouring to avoid Japanese positions near Seoul.

Chinese casualties included 500 killed and wounded against 34 killed and 54 wounded for the Japanese.

== Aftermath ==
The defeat of the Chinese forces at Asan broke the possibility of a Chinese encirclement of the Korean capital of Seoul. On 30 July, after the Japanese victory at Seonghwan, General Oshima's troops entered Asan undisturbed, and within the following week cleared the area of the remaining Chinese forces. Consequently, the southern and central parts of Korea came under complete Japanese control. The victorious Japanese army returned to Seoul on 5 August 1894.

Clashes between Chinese and Japanese forces at Pungdo and Seonghwan caused an irreversible alteration to Sino-Japanese relations and meant that a state of war now existed between the two countries. Following the battle, formal declarations of war were officially issued by the Chinese government on 31 July and the Japanese government on 1 August.
