= Chinese gunboat Tsao-kiang =

Qing, later Japanese, warship (1869–1964)

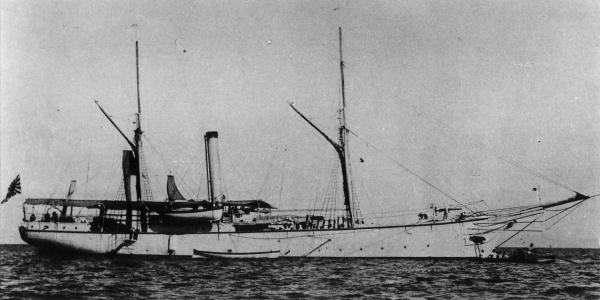
- IJN gunboat Soko in 1897

History

China
- Name: Tsao Kiang
- Builder: Jiangnan Shipyard, Shanghai, China
- Launched: 1869
- Fate: Captured by Japan 27 July 1894

Empire of Japan
- Name: Sōkō
- Acquired: 27 July 1894
- Commissioned: 21 September 1894
- Decommissioned: 26 October 1903
- Fate: Scrapped 1964

General characteristics
- Type: Gunboat
- Displacement: 610 long tons (620 t)
- Length: 47.75 m (156 ft 8 in)
- Beam: 8.61 m (28 ft 3 in)
- Draught: 3.25 m (10 ft 8 in)
- Propulsion: Reciprocating steam engine, 117 HP
- Speed: 9 kn (17 km/h; 10 mph)
- Complement: 79
- Armament: 4 × 160 mm (6.3 in) original; 2 × 76 mm (3.0 in) Armstrongs after 1898

Tsao Kiang (Chinese: 操江; pinyin: Cāojiāng) was a 640-ton wooden (according to other sources: 600-ton composite-hulled) gunboat, launched in 1869 (Note: Conway's gives 1876 as a launching date, however this contradicts the ship's service as described by R.N. Wright's book, which is a more specialised source.) by Jiangnan Shipyard, Shanghai, for the Nanyang Fleet. Acquired in 1872 for Zhili Province by Li Hongzhang the ship served with Beiyang Fleet as a governor's yacht.

During the opening naval battle of the First Sino-Japanese War, Tsao Kiang was captured by the Imperial Japanese Navy cruiser Akitsushima during the Battle of Pungdo on 25 July 1894. Commissioned into the Japanese Navy as a prize of war on 21 September 1894, it was used as a patrol boat along the coastline of Korea during the remainder of that conflict. The ship was renamed Sōkō, based on the Japanese pronunciation of her original name. On 21 March 1898, Sōkō was de-rated to a second-class gunboat, and was used for surveys of the Kurile Islands in Japan's northern waters. On 22 May 1903, Sōkō ran aground in Muroran harbor, but was refloated on 9 July. On 26 October, the vessel was transferred from the Imperial Japanese Navy to the control of the Japanese Home Ministry, and was used as a guard boat in Kobe. In 1924, it was sold off by the Japanese government to a private buyer in Nishinomiya, Hyogo and continued to be used as a civilian transport under the name Sōkō Maru until 1964.
