= Ōshima Yoshimasa =

Japanese general (1850–1926)

Viscount Ōshima Yoshimasa
- 大島 義昌
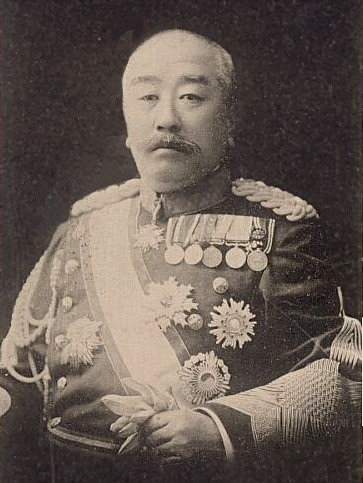

1st Governor-General of the Kwantung Leased Territory
- In office 18 October 1905 – 26 April 1912
- Monarch: Meiji
- Preceded by: Office established
- Succeeded by: Fukushima Yasumasa

Personal details
- Born: 20 September 1850 Yuya, Nagato, Japan
- Died: 10 April 1926 (aged 75) Shinjuku, Tokyo, Japan
- Relatives: Harukazu Nagaoka (son-in-law)
- Awards: Order of the Golden Kite; Order of the Rising Sun

Military service
- Allegiance: Empire of Japan
- Branch/service: Imperial Japanese Army
- Years of service: 1871–1912
- Rank: General
- Commands: 12th Division; Northern China Area Army; First General Army
- Battles/wars: Boshin War; Satsuma Rebellion; Donghak Peasant Revolution; First Sino-Japanese War; Battle of Seonghwan; Russo-Japanese War; Battle of Liaoyang; Battle of Shaho; Battle of Mukden

Viscount Ōshima Yoshimasa (大島 義昌; 20 September 1850 – 10 April 1926) was a general in the early Imperial Japanese Army during the First Sino-Japanese War and the Russo-Japanese War. His great-great-grandson, Shinzō Abe was Prime Minister of Japan.

== Biography ==
Ōshima was born as the eldest son to a samurai of Chōshū Domain (present-day Yamaguchi Prefecture), and fought as a member of the Satchō Alliance forces in support of Emperor Meiji during the Boshin War against the Tokugawa shogunate. After the Meiji Restoration, he attended military school in Osaka in 1870 and was commissioned as a lieutenant in the fledgling Imperial Japanese Army in August 1871. Assigned to the IJA 4th Infantry Regiment, he was promoted to captain the following year, and became battalion commander of the IJA 1st Infantry Regiment in 1873. During the Satsuma Rebellion of 1877, he was promoted to major. After the war, he served in a number of staff positions with the Sendai Garrison and became a colonel in 1886. In 1887 he became chief-of-staff of the Tokyo Garrison and following the reorganization of the Imperial Japanese Army under the recommendations of Prussian military advisor Jakob Meckel, he became chief-of-staff of the IJA 1st Division. In June 1891, Ōshima was promoted to major general and was assigned command of the IJA 9th Infantry Brigade, which was also styled the “Ōshima Combined Brigade”. Dispatched to the Korean Peninsula in 1894 during the Donghak Rebellion, his 4,000 man force was tasked with expelling the Empire of China's Beiyang Army from Korean territory by force.

On 28 July 1894, his forces defeated the Chinese at the Battle of Seonghwan outside of Asan, south of Seoul in the first land engagement of the First Sino-Japanese War. For his victory, Ōshima was made a baron (danshaku) in the kazoku peerage system, and assigned to command of the Tsushima Garrison. In February 1898 he was promoted to lieutenant general.

During the Russo-Japanese War, Ōshima was commander of the IJA 3rd Division under the Japanese Second Army, under General Oku Yasukata. He led the division at the Battle of Liaoyang, Battle of Shaho, and the Battle of Mukden. At the end of the war, he was promoted to general, and served as Governor-General of Kwantung Leased Territory from October 1905 to April 1912. During this time, he laid the foundations of what would be called the Kwantung Army.

In 1907, Ōshima was elevated in status to viscount (shishaku). He served on the Imperial Japanese Army General Staff from September 1911, and was awarded the Order of the Paulownia Flowers in June 1912. He retired from service in August 1915, and died in 1926.

== Decorations ==
- 1878 – Order of the Rising Sun, 4th class
- 1885 – Order of the Rising Sun, 3rd class
- 1895 – Order of the Sacred Treasure, 2nd class
- 1895 – Order of the Rising Sun, 2nd class
- 1901 – Order of the Golden Kite, 3rd class
- 1903 – Grand Cordon of the Order of the Sacred Treasure
- 1906 – Grand Cordon of the Order of the Rising Sun
- 1906 – Order of the Golden Kite, 2nd class
- 1912 – Order of the Rising Sun: Grand Cordon of the Paulownia Flowers
