= Ye Zhichao =

Chinese general (1838-1901)

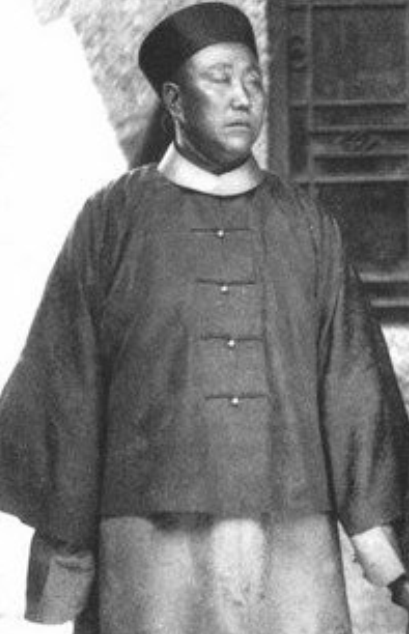
Ye Zhichao

Ye Zhichao (Chinese: 葉志超; Wade–Giles: Yeh Chih-ch'ao; 1838–1901) was a Chinese general of the Qing Dynasty who fought in the First Sino-Japanese War, being the commander of Qing forces stationed in Korea.

== Biography ==
Ye began his military career during the Nian Rebellion, joining Li Hongzhang's Huai Army in 1862. At first, he served as an army cook, but volunteered to serve as a regular combatant. In one of his first battles, he was shot in the waist, but emerged unharmed as the bullet had not penetrated his scabbard. Taking this as a sign of divine favor, Ye subsequently volunteered to take the lead in any charge and became "legendary" for his bravery. This earned him promotions, whereupon he also demonstrated skill as a tactician. His repeated successes against insurgents earned Ye the favor of his superior Li Hongzhang, resulting in his continued rise in the ranks.

Li appointed Ye as the commander of the Zhengding Trained Army in 1875 and as the commander-in-chief of Zhili in 1889. In 1891, Ye was sent to intervene in the Jindandao incident, a genocidal massacre of Mongols by Han rebels. Ye falsely reported to the imperial court in Beijing that the Mongol banner army had killed innocent Chinese during the incident. Prince Vangdudnamjil, the jasagh of the Kharachin Right Banner, who was consulted with by the imperial court, successfully rebutted General Ye's claim with a detailed report.

By the time of the First Sino-Japanese War, Ye was an aging veteran and was reputed to have become an opium addict. As commander of the Zhili provincial troops under Li Hongzhang when the Sino-Japanese war broke out in 1894, General Ye initially led the 3,000 Chinese army at Asan, but when they were driven out of the city by the Imperial Japanese Army and he retreated north to Pyongyang. Following the defeat at Pyongyang by the Japanese in September 1894, Ye Zhichao ordered the Chinese defenders to retreat over the Yalu River (which marked the border between China and Korea) into Qing territory. General Ye was sentenced to death for his failures, but managed to avoid being executed due to his guanxi connections.

According to researcher John Dong, Ye was widely condemned as an incompetent coward for his failures in the First Sino-Japanese War; it was falsely claimed that he had only risen in the military due to nepotism. By the 21st century, Chinese historians began to "exonerate Ye from his poor legacy", reconstructing his career and judging that his defeats in the First Sino-Japanese War were not attributable to any major faults of his leadership.

== Sources ==
=== Books ===
- Paine, S.C.M (2003). The Sino-Japanese War of 1894–1895: Perception, Power, and Primacy. Cambridge University Press. ISBN 0-521-81714-5.
- Paine, S.C.M (2017). The Japanese Empire: Grand Strategy from the Meiji Restoration to the Pacific War. Cambridge University Press. ISBN 978-1107676169.
- Schmidt, J.D. (2007). Within the Human Realm: The Poetry of Huang Zunxian, 1848-1905. Cambridge University Press. ISBN 978-0521036665.
- Dong, John (2025). Sunstruck Giant Volume 1: The Sino-Japanese War of 1894-95. Helion & Company. ISBN 978-1804518151.
