= Holland-class cruiser =

Class of six protected cruisers of the Royal Netherlands Navy

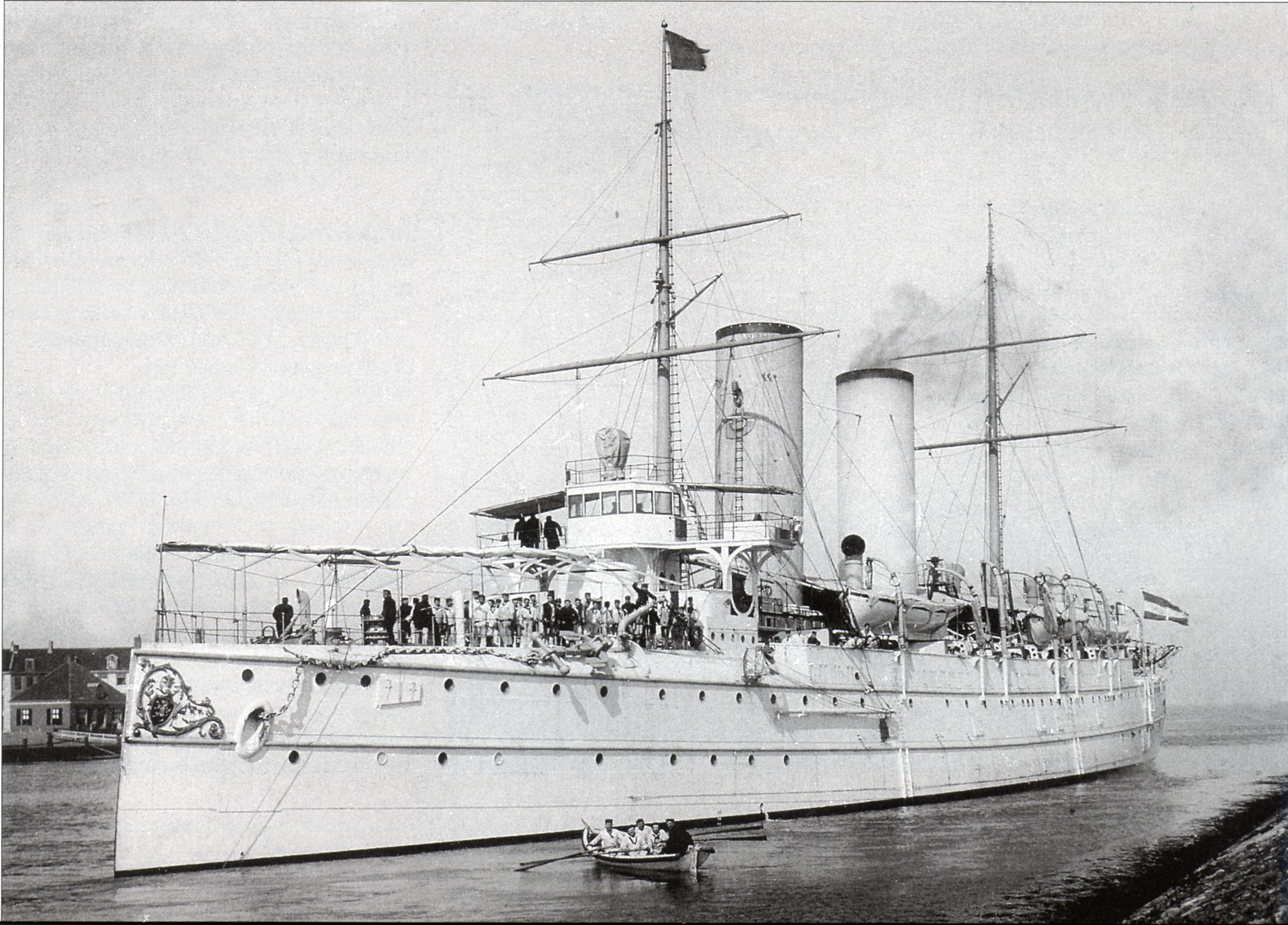
- HNLMS Noordbrabant

Class overview
- Name: Holland class
- Builders: Rijkswerf, Amsterdam; Koninklijke Maatschappij de Schelde, Flushing; Nederlandsche Stoomboot Maatschappij, Rotterdam
- Operators: Royal Netherlands Navy; Kriegsmarine
- Preceded by: Koningin Wilhelmina der Nederlanden
- Succeeded by: Java class
- Built: 1895–1901
- In commission: 1898–1944
- Completed: 6
- Lost: 1
- Retired: 5

General characteristics
- Type: Protected cruiser
- Displacement: 3,900 tons (first 3 ships); 4,033 (last 3 ships)
- Length: 93.3 m (306 ft 1 in) (first 3 ships); 94.7 m (310 ft 8 in) (last 3 ships)
- Beam: 14.8 m (48 ft 7 in)
- Draught: 5.41 m (17 ft 9 in)
- Propulsion: 10,000 ihp (7,500 kW), two shafts
- Speed: 20 knots (37 km/h)
- Range: 5,000 nmi (9,300 km) at 10 kn (19 km/h; 12 mph)
- Capacity: 855 tons of coal storage
- Complement: 324
- Armament: 2 × 15 cm (5.9 in) (2 × 1); 6 × 12 cm (4.7 in) (6 × 1); 4 × 7.6 cm (3.0 in) (4 × 1); 4 × 1pdr (4 × 1); 2 × 45 cm (18 in) torpedo tubes
- Armour: 5 cm (2.0 in) deck

The Holland class was a class of six protected cruisers (Note: In the Dutch navy the ships where classified as "pantserdekschepen" literally translated: armored deck ships.) of the Royal Netherlands Navy. The class was built in two groups, each consisting of three ships.

== Background ==
The protection of the Dutch East Indies came into the spotlight at the end of the nineteenth century. Many countries began expanding their battle fleets. In 1887, two medium-sized Chinese battleships became operational and were considered superior to the Dutch defence. This led to a reassessment of the defence of the Dutch East Indies.

In April 1892, the foundations for modernisation were formulated by a committee consisting of three officers J.H. Kromhout, F.J. Haver Droeze and G. Kruys. Navy expert, rear admiral and Chief of the Naval Staff, Gerhardus Kruys advocated for new cruisers. In the second half of the 1890s the Holland class cruisers was built, as well as the almost identical second series, the Utrecht class.

== Design ==
The design was derived from the British Apollo-class cruiser, although it featured the more seaworthy form amidships of the Astraea class. The first three ships of the class were 93.3 metres (306 ft 1 in) long while the last three were 94.7 metres (310 ft 8 in) long, had a beam of 14.8 metres (48 ft 7 in), a draught of 5.41 metres (17 ft 9 in), and had a displacement of 3,900 tons. The last three ships were slightly larger and displaced 133 tons more than the first three ships. The ships were equipped with two shaft reciprocating engines, which were rated at 10,000 ihp (7,500 kW) and produced a top speed of 20 knots (37 km/h). The ships had 5-centimetre (2.0 in) deck armour.

=== Armament ===
The main armament of the ships were two 15 cm (5.9 in) single quick firing guns, with one placed at the fore and one at the aft. Secondary armament included six single 12 cm (4.7 in) guns and four 7.6 cm (3.0 in) single guns. In 1914-1915 refits, the 15 cm guns were removed from each ship and replaced with an additional four 12 cm single mounts.

== Construction ==
The class was built in two groups each consisting of three ships. The ships were laid down at Rijkswerf in Amsterdam, Koninklijke Maatschappij de Schelde in Flushing and Nederlandsche Stoomboot Maatschappij in Rotterdam.

Construction data
Name	Laid down	Launched	Commissioned	Decommissioned	Builder
First group
Holland	1895	4 October 1896	1 July 1898	1920	Rijkswerf, Amsterdam
Zeeland	1895	20 March 1897	1 June 1898	1924	Koninklijke Maatschappij de Schelde, Flushing
Friesland	1895	4 November 1896	16 January 1898	1913	Nederlandsche Stoomboot Maatschappij, Rotterdam
Second group
Gelderland	1 November 1897	28 September 1898	15 July 1900	17 May 1940	Nederlandsche Stoomboot Maatschappij, Rotterdam
Noordbrabant	31 August 1897	17 January 1899	1 March 1900	17 May 1940	Koninklijke Maatschappij de Schelde, Flushing
Utrecht	1897	14 July 1898	1 March 1901	1913	Rijkswerf, Amsterdam

== Service history ==
On 19 October 1900 Gelderland transported Paul Kruger to Europe during the Second Boer War. Holland together with Koningin Wilhelmina der Nederlanden and the Evertsen-class coastal defence ship Piet Hein were sent to Shanghai to defend Dutch interests during the Boxer Rebellion. Holland and Zeeland together with the coastal defence ships Hertog Hendrik, Koningin Regentes and De Ruyter assisted the KNIL during the Aceh War.

In 1908 Friesland, Gelderland and the coastal defence ship Jacob Van Heemskerck were sent to patrol the Venezuelan coast during the second Castro crisis. Friesland and Utrecht were decommissioned in 1913 with the remaining four being modernized. During World War I all remaining ships were stationed in Dutch home waters.

Holland and Zeeland were decommissioned in 1920 and 1924 while Noordbrabant became an accommodation ship in 1920. A role she fulfilled until she was damaged during the German invasion in World War II. Gelderland became a training ship in 1920. She was captured by Germany in 1940, renamed Niobe and sunk in Kotka harbour in Finland on 16 July 1944.

== See also ==
- List of cruisers of the Netherlands

== Notes ==
=== Bibliography ===
- Cohen Stuart, W.J. (1937). De Nederlandsche Zeemacht van 1889 tot 1915 (in Dutch). Vol. I: De Nederlandsche Zeemacht 1889-1903. The Hague: Algemeene Landsdrukkerij.
- Evers, F.J.H. (1902). Oorlogsschepen (in Dutch). Amsterdam: Joh. G. Stemler Cz.
- Johnson, Harold & Marshall, Peter A. (2015). "Question 9/51: Dutch Cruiser Gelderland". Warship International. LII (1): 79–81. ISSN 0043-0374.
- J.J.F., Pennink (1903). Batavus! Waar zijn uwe galjoenen? Eene Vlootbeschouwing (in Dutch). Amsterdam: Van Mantgem & De Does.
- J. Anten. (2011) Navalisme Nekt Onderzeeboot; De invloed van buitenlandse zeestrategieën op de Nederlandse zeestrategie voor de defensie van Nederlands-Indië, 1912-1942. Universiteit Leiden. Amsterdam University Press.
