= HNLMS Utrecht (1898) =

Holland-class protected cruiser of the Royal Netherlands Navy

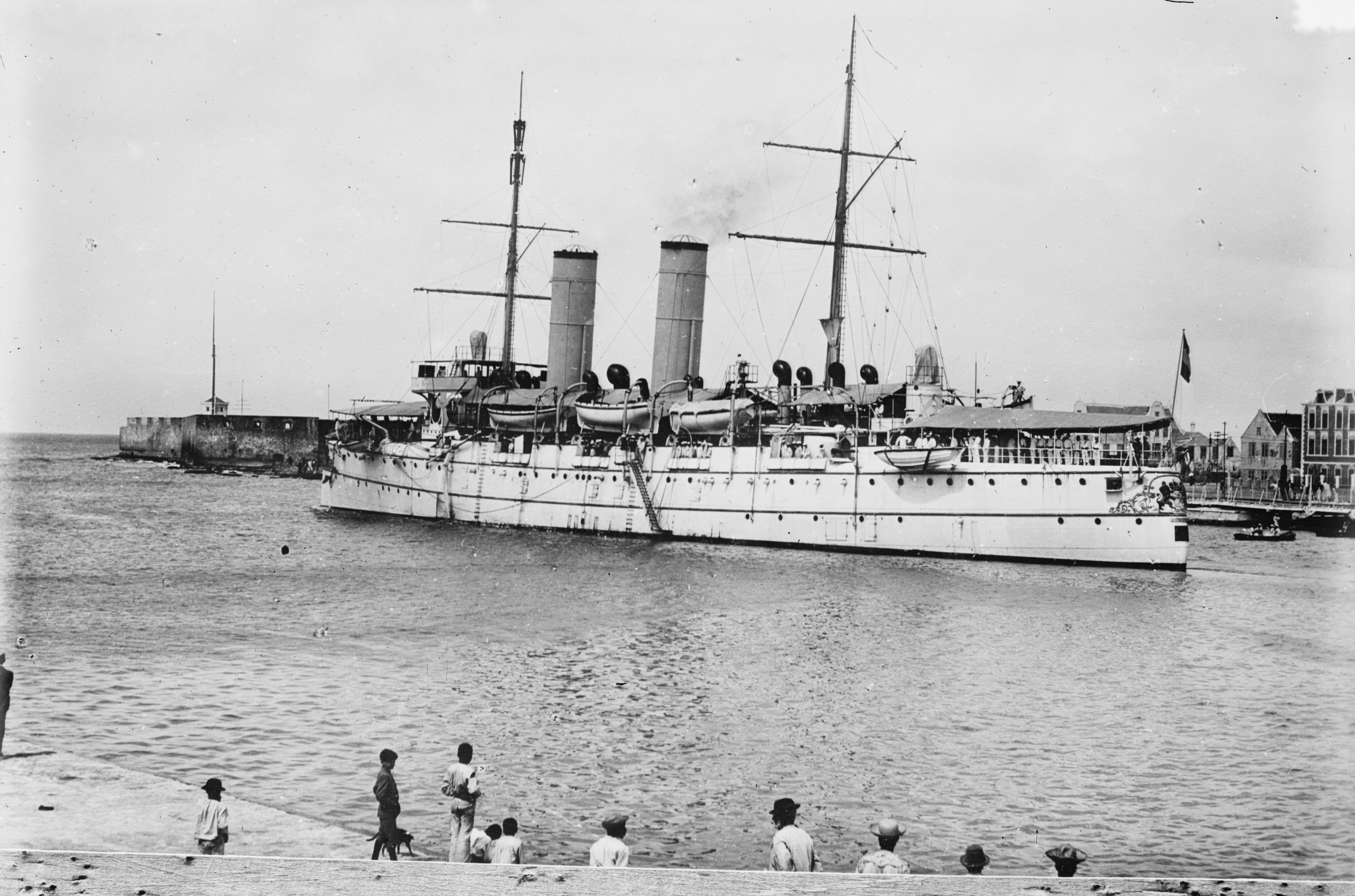
- Utrecht at Curaçao

History

Netherlands
- Name: Utrecht
- Namesake: Province of Utrecht
- Builder: Rijkswerf, Amsterdam
- Laid down: 1897
- Launched: 14 July 1898
- Commissioned: 1 March 1901
- Decommissioned: 1913
- Fate: Scrapped

General characteristics
- Class & type: Holland-class cruiser
- Displacement: 4,033 tons
- Length: 94.7 m (310 ft 8 in)
- Beam: 14.8 m (48 ft 7 in)
- Draught: 5.41 m (17 ft 9 in)
- Propulsion: 10,000 ihp (7,500 kW), two shafts
- Speed: 20 knots (37 km/h)
- Complement: 324
- Armament: 2 × 5.9 in (15 cm) (2 × 1); 6 × 4.7 in (12 cm) (6 × 1); 4 × 3 in (7.6 cm) (4 × 1); 4 × 1pdr (4 × 1); 2 × 45 cm (18 in) torpedo tubes
- Armour: 5 cm (2.0 in) deck

HNLMS Utrecht (Dutch: Hr.Ms. Utrecht) was a Holland-class protected cruiser of the Royal Netherlands Navy.

== Design ==
The ship was 94.7 metres (310 ft 8 in) long, had a beam of 14.8 metres (48 ft 7 in), a draught of 5.41 metres (17 ft 9 in), and had a displacement of 4,033 ton. The ship was equipped with 2 shaft reciprocating engines, which were rated at 10,000 ihp (7,500 kW) and produced a top speed of 20 knots (37 km/h). The ship had a deck armour of 2 in (5.1 cm). Two 5.9 in (15 cm) single turret guns provided the ship's main armament, and these were augmented by six single 4.7 in (12 cm) guns and four 3 in (7.6 cm) single guns. The ship had a complement of 324 men.

== Service history ==
Utrecht was built at the Rijkswerf in Amsterdam and launched on 14 July 1898. The Nederlandsche Fabriek van Werktuigen en spoorwegmaterieel then started to install the machinery. It finished this job on 31 May 1899. Meanwhile, Utrecht was lifted by Koninginnedok, so the propellers could be attached.

Utrecht was commissioned on 1 March 1901. On 6 May that year Utrecht made a trip with adelborsten to the Mediterranean Sea. The ports of Cádiz, La Spezia, Naples and Toulon were visited. On 22 July, the ship arrived in the port of Flushing concluding the trip.

In 1902, Utrecht was sent to Venezuela together with Koningin Regentes and on 2 April 1902 they arrived in the Venezuelan port of La Guaira. Prior to their arrival, the Venezuelan Navy had repeatedly checked Dutch and Antillean merchant ships and the presence of the Dutch warships acted as a deterrent against further actions.

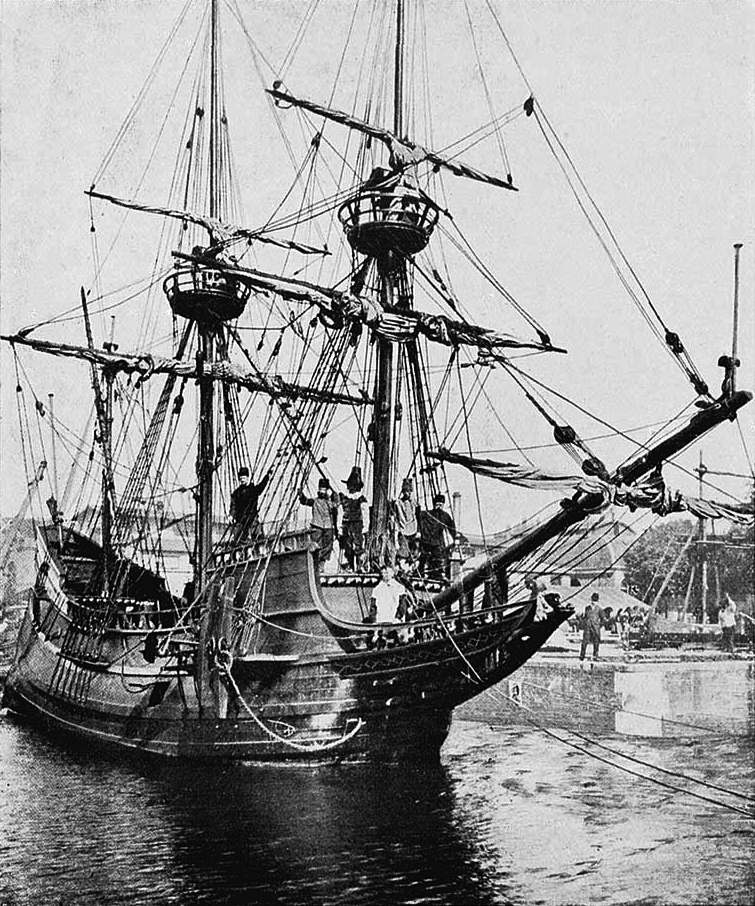
The replica of Hudson's Halve Maen

On 6 July 1904, Utrecht and Gelderland both ran aground near Aroes Lampoejang, South Sumatra because of incomplete maps. The ships where repaired in respectively Surabaya and Singapore. Later that year on 18 September, Utrecht assisted Van Outshoorn of the Koninklijke Paketvaart Maatschappij that had hit a cliff.

On 17 June 1905, Utrecht and her sisters Noordbrabant and Gelderland returned to the Netherlands. The journey took them to Tanjung Priok, Mahé, Perim, Port Said, Algiers and Tangier before they arriving on 30 August at Den Helder.

On 1 September 1909, Utrecht left Suriname for a visit to New York City. The ship was there to participate in the Hudson–Fulton Celebration, held in honor of the arrival of Henry Hudson in America on the ship Halve Maen of the Dutch East India Company and the launch of a Robert Fulton designed steamship in 1809. The ship participated in a fleet review on the Hudson River. During this review the crew of Utrecht dressed in seventeenth century costumes and sailed on a replica of Hudson's ship Halve Maen that was built by the Rijkswerf in Amsterdam. The replica was later offered to the chairman of the committee of the feasts. However the replica was destroyed in a fire shortly after.

25 April 1910, the ship left Paramaribo for a trip to Buenos Aires for the celebration of 100 years independence of Argentina. On 21 May, that year she participated in a fleet review held there. On 2 July, Utrecht started on the journey back with stops in Brazil and Grenada. On 26 August, the ship was back in Suriname.

The ships was decommissioned in 1913.
