= HNLMS Gelderland (1898) =

Dutch navy ship

Coordinates: 60°29′N 26°58′E

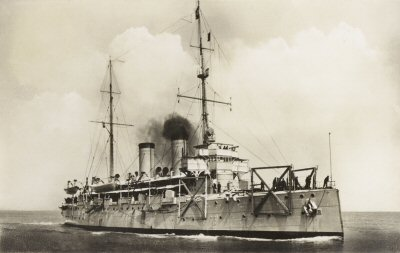
- Gelderland

History

Netherlands
- Name: Gelderland
- Namesake: Gelderland
- Builder: Maatschappij voor Scheeps- en Werktuigbouw Fijenoord, Rotterdam
- Laid down: 1 November 1897
- Launched: 28 September 1898
- Commissioned: 15 July 1900
- Decommissioned: 14 May 1940
- Fate: Seized by Germany, March 1941

Nazi Germany
- Name: Niobe
- Namesake: Niobe
- Commissioned: 1 March 1944
- Fate: Sunk by enemy action on 16 July 1944; Raised and scrapped in June 1953

General characteristics
- Class & type: Holland-class cruiser
- Displacement: 4,100 t
- Length: 94.76 m (310.9 ft)
- Beam: 14.76 m (48.4 ft)
- Draught: 5.4 m (18 ft)
- Propulsion: Two 3-cycle triple expansion engines; 12 Yarrow boilers; 2 shafts; 10,500 PS
- Speed: as Gelderland: 19.5 kn (36.1 km/h; 22.4 mph) (1914); as Niobe: 16 kn (30 km/h; 18 mph) (1944)
- Complement: 397
- Sensors & processing systems: as Niobe: 2× FlaK-Kommandogeräte (optical range finders); 1× Würzburg radar
- Armament: as Gelderland: 2× 150 mm No.3; 6× 120 mm No.2; 6× 75 mm No.2; 8× 37 mm; 4× 37 mm revolver guns; 2× 75 mm; 2× 75 mm mortars; as Niobe: 8× 10.5 cm (4.1 in) SK C/32; 4× 40 mm Bofors L/60; 4× 2 cm (0.79 in) (4×4) Vierlinge C/38

HNLMS Gelderland (Dutch: Hr.Ms. Gelderland) was a Holland-class protected cruiser of the Royal Netherlands Navy. During its career in the Dutch Navy it was most notable for being the ship Queen Wilhelmina sent to Portuguese East Africa to transport Paul Kruger to Europe during the Second Boer War. The ship was taken over by the Germans during World War II, rebuilt as an anti-aircraft cruiser and renamed Niobe. Commissioned into the German navy on 1 March 1944, she was sunk in Kotka harbour in Finland on 16 July 1944.

== Service history ==
The ship was built at the Maatschappij voor Scheeps- en Werktuigbouw Fijenoord in Rotterdam and launched on 28 September 1898. The ship was commissioned on 15 July 1900. On 22 November that year she arrived in Marseille with Paul Kruger who she had picked up in Lourenço Marques by order of the Dutch Government. After dropping Kruger off she left for the Dutch East Indies. During this trip while entering the harbor of Port Said she collided with the British steamer Peterson. The collision required the ship to be repaired at Suez. On 6 January 1901 she could resume her journey and arrived three days later on 9 January in Surabaya.

On 6 July 1904 Gelderland and Utrecht both ran aground near Aroes Lampoejang, South Sumatra because of incomplete maps. The ships were repaired in Surabaya and Singapore respectively.

On 17 June 1905 Gelderland and her sisters Noordbrabant and Utrecht returned to the Netherlands. The journey involved stops in Tanjung Priok, Mahé, Perim, Port Said, Algiers and Tangier arriving at Den Helder on 30 August that year.

In 1908 Gelderland, together with her sisters Friesland and Jacob van Heemskerck, was sent to patrol the Venezuelan coast during the Second Castro crisis. On 12 December 1908, the Gelderland captured the Venezuelan gunboat Alix off Puerto Cabello. She and another ship the 23 de Mayo were interned in the harbor of Willemstad. With their overwhelming naval superiority, the Dutch Navy enforced a blockade on Venezuela's ports.

On 17 June 1911 Gelderland left Rotterdam for England. On board was Prince Henry of the Netherlands who traveled to the United Kingdom to attend the coronation of George V. For the last part of the journey Gelderland was escorted by four British torpedo boats.

Gelderland was sent to Constantinople on 11 November 1912 because of rising political tension and a direct war threat. A landing party of 100 men was put ashore and took position in the legations section of the city on 18 November 1912. She was relieved by Kortenaer on 30 May 1913.

While patrolling along the Dutch coast an explosion occurred on 14 March 1917, killing one man and severely wounding nine others. After returning to port the ship was taken out of service for maintenance.

After World War I she served as an artillery training ship in the Dutch navy. To facilitate this role, her two 150 mm No.3 cannons would often be swapped out with two additional 120 mm No.2 cannons, and her 75mm mortars were removed.

=== World War II ===
The ship was retired from service in early 1940 and disarmed with her cannons being used to reinforce coastal defensive positions. While still fully operational, the ship was docked near the HNLMS Hertog Hendrik which had also been retired in 1940 after serving as a battery ship. Both ships would then be seized by the Germans during their invasion of the Netherlands, and remain laid up at Den Helder from 14 May 1940 until August 1941. The Gelderland was then taken in hand at the Van der Giessen de Noord shipyard at Krimpen aan den IJssel to be rebuilt as an anti-aircraft cruiser ("Flakschiff"). Work was completed in December 1943, and Gelderland commissioned in the German Kriegsmarine under the new name of Niobe on 1 March 1944.

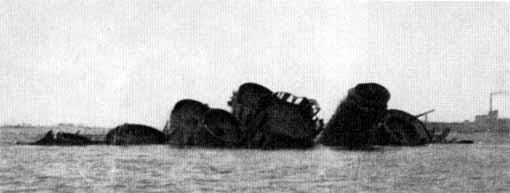
The wreck of Niobe in Kotka

During the Vyborg–Petrozavodsk Offensive of 1944 the Soviets tried to finish the Continuation War with the Finns. The Germans came to the aid of the Finns, and, among the materiel brought with them was the anti-aircraft cruiser Niobe, which was ordered to strengthen the air defences of Kotka, then one of the most bombed cities in Finland. At the same time, the Soviet Union had put much emphasis on finding and sinking the Finnish coastal defence ship Väinämöinen. Soviet aerial reconnaissance identified a large ship in Kotka harbour and the decision was taken to attack, with 132 bombers and fighters (sent by, amongst others, the 51st Mine-Torpedo Aviation Regiment of the Red Banner Baltic Fleet), on 16 July 1944. The ship was, however, Niobe, and the aircraft were met with fierce resistance. An A-20 Havoc bomber was shot down, but the ship was hit and sank. The guns of the Niobe were still firing as she settled in the shallow water, after which much of her superstructure remained visible above sea level. Seventy of the crew of the Niobe died.

Niobe was raised in June 1953 and scrapped.

== Bibliography ==
- Dodson, Aidan & Nottlemann, Dirk (2025). "The German Flak Ships Part II: The Former Dutch and Danish Hulls". In Jordan, John (ed.). Warship 2025. London: Bloomsbury Publishing Plc. pp. 172–185. ISBN 978-1-4728-6854-1.
- Gröner, Erich (1990). Die deutschen Kriegsschiffe: 1815-1945 / 7 Landungsverbände (2): Landungsfahrzeuge i.e.S. (Teil 2), Landungsfähren, Landungsunterstützungsfahrzeuge, Transporter; Schiffe und Boote des Heeres, Schiffe und Boote der Seeflieger/Luftwaffe, K olonialfahrzeuge. Koblenz: Bernard & Graefe. pp. 214–215. ISBN 3-7637-4807-5.
- Johnson, Harold & Marshall, Peter A. (2015). "Question 9/51: Dutch Cruiser Gelderland". Warship International. LII (1): 79–81. ISSN 0043-0374.
- Mulder, Jantinus (2024). Warship 5: Protected Cruiser Gelderland. Amsterdam University Press.
- Sieche, Erwin F. (1990). "Austria-Hungary's Last Visit to the USA". Warship International. XXVII (2): 142–164. ISSN 0043-0374.
