= HNLMS Holland (1896) =

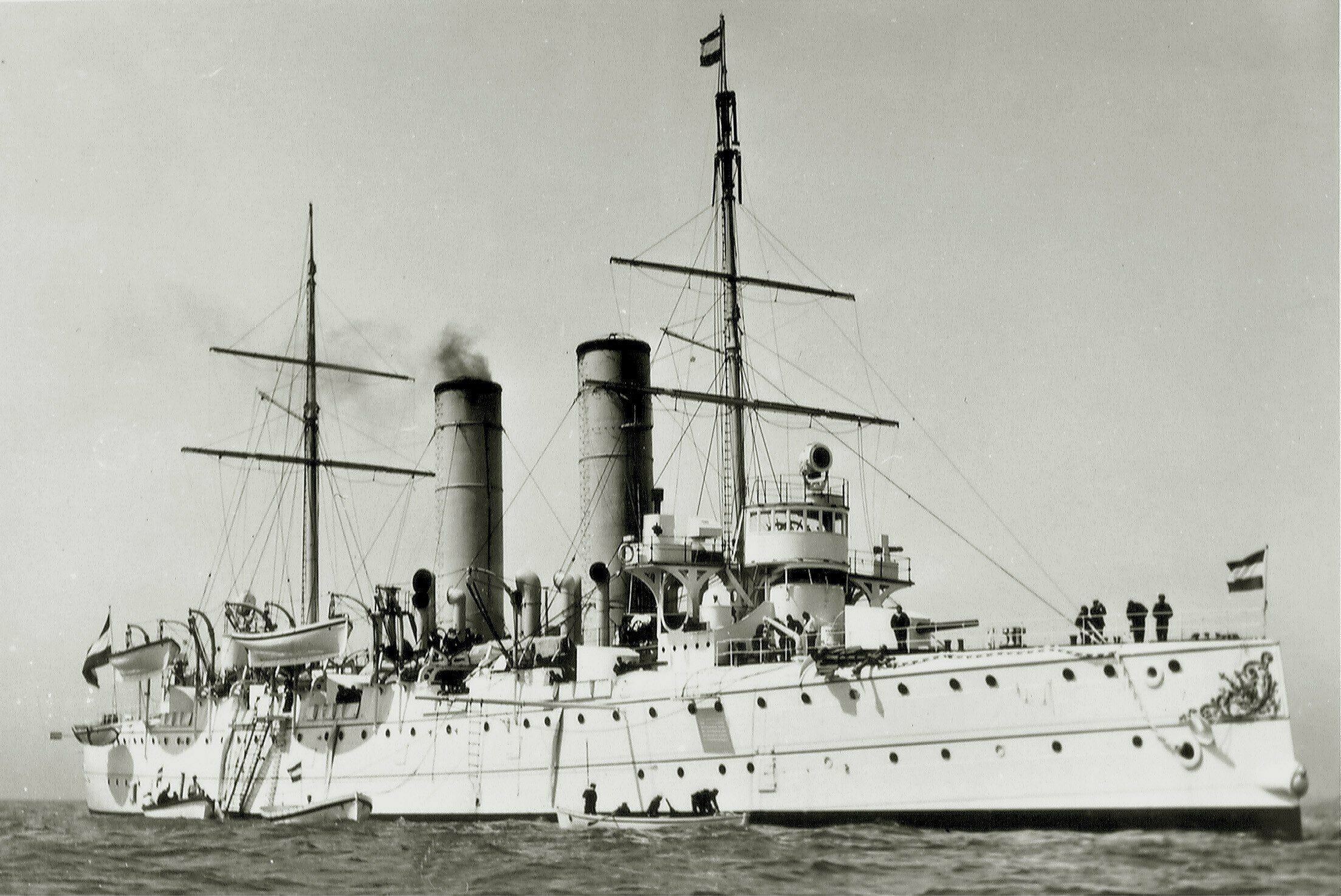
- Holland

History

Netherlands
- Name: Holland
- Namesake: Holland
- Builder: Rijkswerf in Amsterdam
- Laid down: 1895
- Launched: 4 October 1896
- Commissioned: 1 July 1898
- Decommissioned: 1920
- Fate: Scrapped

General characteristics
- Class & type: Holland-class cruiser
- Displacement: 3,900 tons
- Length: 93.3 m (306 ft 1 in)
- Beam: 14.8 m (48 ft 7 in)
- Draught: 5.41 m (17 ft 9 in)
- Propulsion: 10,000 ihp (7,500 kW), two shafts
- Speed: 20 knots (37 km/h)
- Complement: 324
- Armament: 2 × 5.9 in (15 cm) (2 × 1); 6 × 4.7 in (12 cm) (6 × 1); 4 × 3 in (7.6 cm) (4 × 1); 4 × 1pdr (4 × 1); 2 × 45 cm (18 in) torpedo tubes
- Armour: 5 cm (2.0 in) deck

HNLMS Holland (Dutch: Hr.Ms. Holland) was a Holland-class protected cruiser of the Royal Netherlands Navy.

== Design ==
The ship was 93.3 metres (306 ft 1 in) long, had a beam of 14.8 metres (48 ft 7 in), a draught of 5.41 metres (17 ft 9 in), and had a displacement of 3,900 ton. The ship was equipped with 2 shaft reciprocating engines, which were rated at 10,000 ihp (7,500 kW) and produced a top speed of 20 knots (37 km/h). The ship had a deck armour of 2 in (5.1 cm). Two 5.9 in (15 cm) single turret guns provided the ship's main armament, and these were augmented by six single 4.7 in (12 cm) guns and four 3 in (7.6 cm) single guns. The ship had a complement of 324 men.

== Service history ==
Holland was built at the Rijkswerf in Amsterdam and launched on 4 October 1896. The ship was commissioned on 1 July 1898. She left the port of Den Helder on 7 January for the Dutch East Indies.

In 1900 the ship together with the coastal defence ship Piet Hein and the protected cruiser Koningin Wilhelmina der Nederlanden was sent to Shanghai to safeguard European citizens and Dutch interests in the region during the Boxer Rebellion. A landing party from Holland assisted in the defense of the Shanghai French Concession where many Dutch citizens where present. She and Koningin Wilhelmina der Nederlanden returned in the middle of October that year to the Dutch East Indies.

In 1910 the ship together with Hertog Hendrik escorted Noordbrabant that had hit a cliff on 31 May while en route to Surabaya. The collision caused the flooding of several compartments of the ship. Damaged as she was, Noordbrabant could continue to steam on her own.

The ship was sent in 1911 again to Shanghai to protect European citizens at the time of the fall of Imperial China. Holland arrived on 4 November that year.

In 1912 she was sent to represent the Dutch queen at the funeral of the Japanese emperor Meiji in Yokohama.

The ships was decommissioned in 1920.
