= HNLMS Noordbrabant (1899) =

Holland-class cruiser launched in 1899

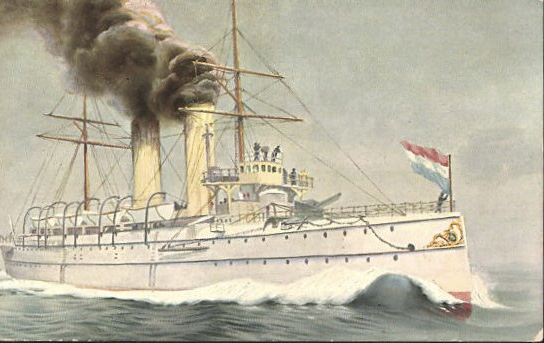
- Noordbrabant

History

Netherlands
- Name: Noordbrabant
- Builder: Koninklijke Maatschappij de Schelde, Flushing
- Laid down: 31 August 1897
- Launched: 17 January 1899
- Commissioned: 1 March 1900
- Decommissioned: 1920
- Fate: Scuttled on 17 May 1940

General characteristics
- Class & type: Holland-class cruiser
- Displacement: 4,033 tons
- Length: 94.7 m (310 ft 8 in)
- Beam: 14.8 m (48 ft 7 in)
- Draught: 5.41 m (17 ft 9 in)
- Propulsion: 10,000 ihp (7,500 kW), two shafts
- Speed: 20 knots (37 km/h)
- Complement: 324
- Armament: 2 × 5.9 in (15 cm) (2 × 1); 6 × 4.7 in (12 cm) (6 × 1); 4 × 3 in (7.6 cm) (4 × 1); 4 × 1pdr (4 × 1); 2 × 45 cm (18 in) torpedo tubes
- Armour: 5 cm (2.0 in) deck

HNLMS Noordbrabant (Dutch: Hr.Ms. Noordbrabant) was a Holland-class protected cruiser of the Royal Netherlands Navy.

== Design ==
The ship was 94.7 metres (310 ft 8 in) long, had a beam of 14.8 metres (48 ft 7 in), a draught of 5.41 metres (17 ft 9 in), and had a displacement of 4,033 ton. The ship was equipped with 2 shaft reciprocating engines, which were rated at 10,000 ihp (7,500 kW) and produced a top speed of 20 knots (37 km/h). The ship had a deck armour of 2 in (5.1 cm). Two 5.9 in (15 cm) single turret guns provided the ship's main armament, and these were augmented by six single 4.7 in (12 cm) guns and four 3 in (7.6 cm) single guns. The ship had a complement of 324 men.

== Service history ==
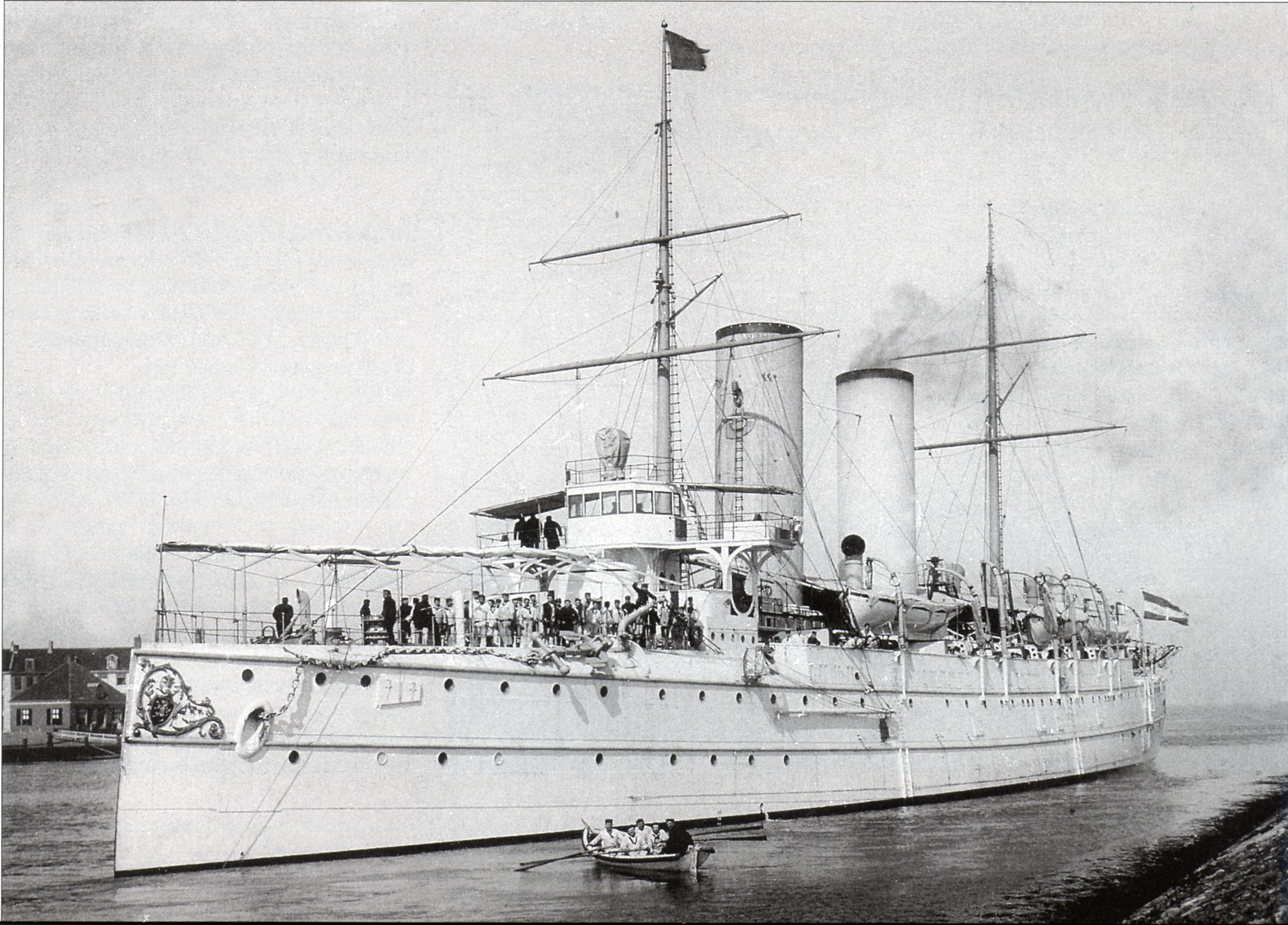
Noord-Brabant

The ship was built at the Koninklijke Maatschappij de Schelde in Flushing and launched on 17 January 1899. The ship was commissioned on 1 March 1900. Later that year the ship visited Kiel and participated in the Kieler Woche where the German Emperor Wilhelm II made several visits to the ship.

On 6 February 1901 Noordbrabant left the port of Flushing for the Dutch East Indies. The ship arrived on 23 March that year in Tanjung Priok. Later that year on 16 April the ship made a trip to Melbourne and Albany, Australia to represent the government of the Dutch East Indies at the opening of the Australian parliament in May 1901.

On 17 June 1905 Noordbrabant and her sisters Gelderland and Utrecht returned to the Netherlands. The journey made stops at Tanjung Priok, Mahé, Perim, Port Said, Algiers and Tangier before arriving at Den Helder on 30 August.

Noordbrabant began a journey from Surabaya to San Francisco on 28 August 1909. The trip was made for the first time without using her sails. Coal was replenished at Manado, the Marshall Islands and Hawaii. On 12 October Noordbrabant arrived in San Francisco where the crew participated in the Portola feasts in commemoration of the 1906 San Francisco earthquake.

In 1910 Noordbrabant hit a cliff on 31 May while en route to Surabaya. The collision caused the flooding of several compartments of the ship. Damaged as she was she could continue on steam on her own. Hertog Hendrik and Holland escorted the ship to Surabaya.

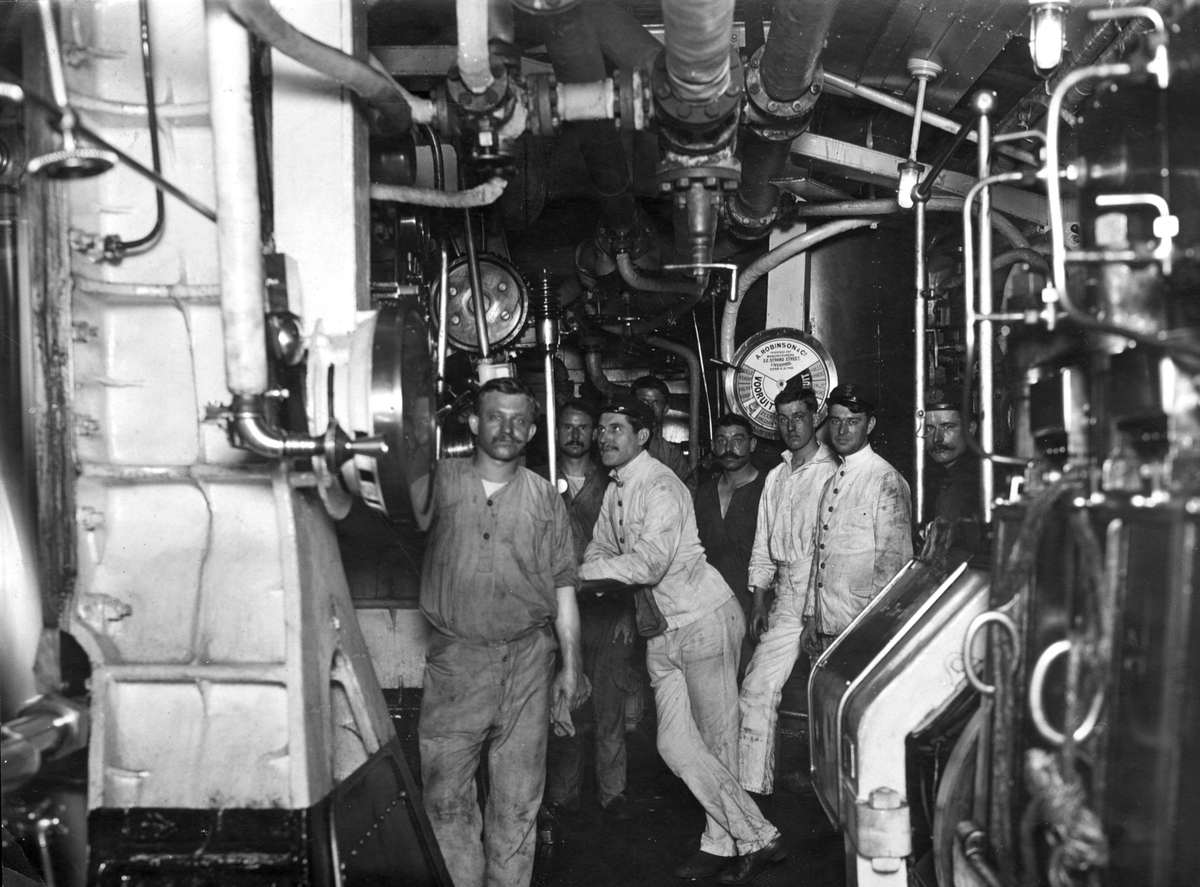
The ship's starboard engine room, June 1914

On 18 June 1914 the ship left for Durrës to retrieve the remains of Major Lodewijk Thomson and bring them back to the Netherlands. Thomson was killed during a peacekeeping mission there.

On 6 January 1916 the British submarine HMS E17 stranded on the Dutch coast but managed to pull itself loose. The commander of the submarine decided to later scuttle the boat outside territorial waters. The crew was picked up by Noordbrabant and brought to Den Helder.

The ship was retired from service as a protected cruiser in 1920 and was rebuilt as a mobile accommodation ship. She was towed to Flushing in October 1926.

Second World War

When mobilization of the Dutch forces occurred at the end of 1939, the Noordbrabant only had a single functional 7.5 cm (3.0 in) cannon. Her combat value was therefor abysmall. On 17 May 1940 the ship was set on fire by its own crew to prevent capture by the invading German forces. Her wreck would be refloated and considered for reconstruction into an anti-aircraft cruiser ("Flakschiff") like her sister ship Gelderland, however it was deemed too expensive and she was eventually scrapped.
