= German cruiser Niobe =

Two cruisers of the German navy were named Niobe and built in 1898:

- SMS Niobe, launched in 1899, in service 1900–1925
- German cruiser Niobe (1940), in service 1940–1944
