= Rijkswerf (Amsterdam) =

Shipyard in Amsterdam, North Holland, Netherlands

Coordinates: 52°22′21.82″N 4°55′2.58″E

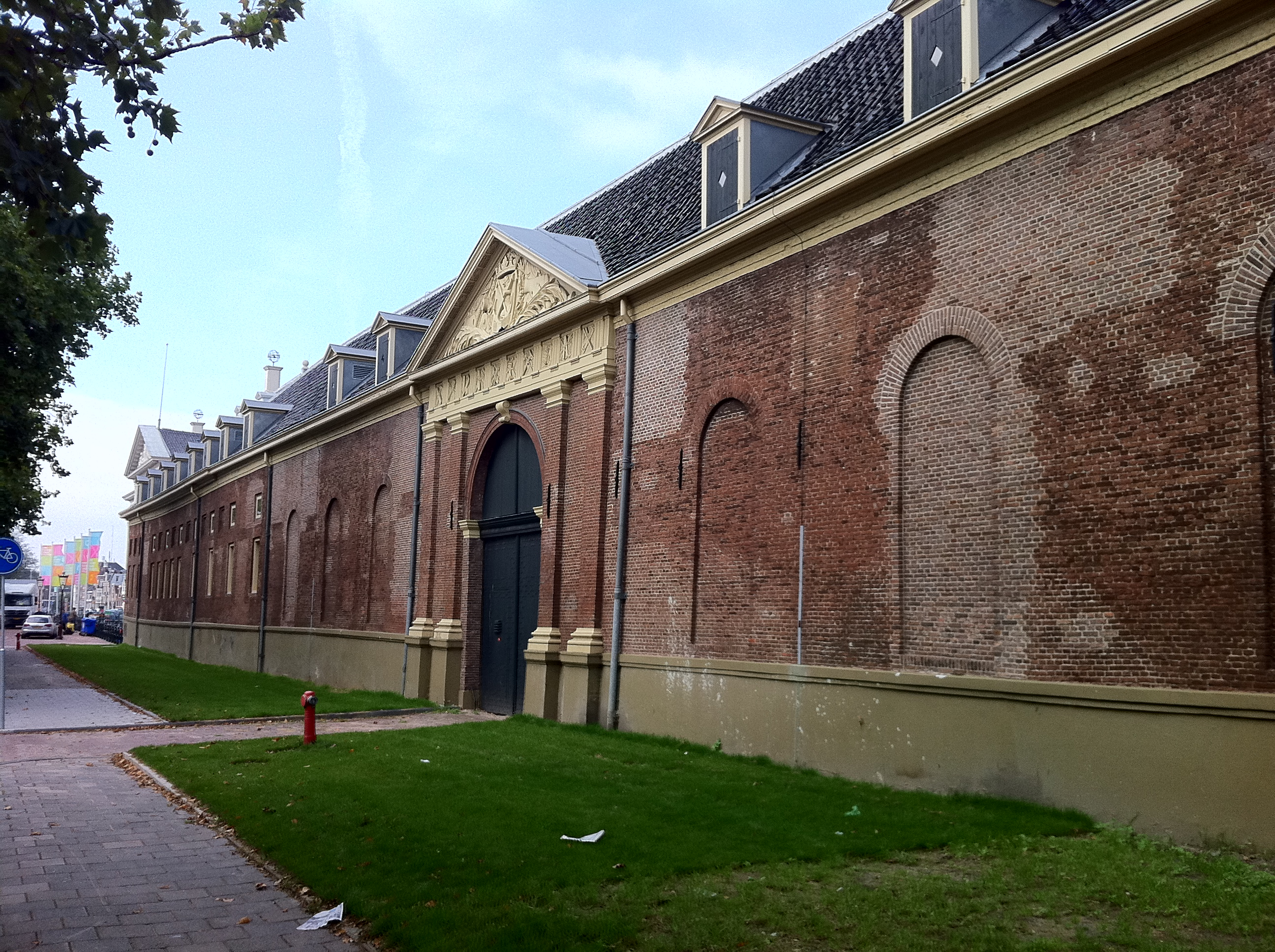
- Exterior of the yard on Kattenburgrstraat
- Industry: Shipbuilding
- Founded: 1655; 371 years ago (at location)
- Defunct: 1915; 111 years ago
- Headquarters: Amsterdam, the Netherlands
- Products: Warships

The Rijkswerf (Dutch: State shipyard) in Amsterdam was a Dutch shipyard that build a significant amount of warships for the Royal Netherlands Navy.

== Predecessors of the Rijkswerf ==
=== Shipyard of the Amsterdam Admiralty ===
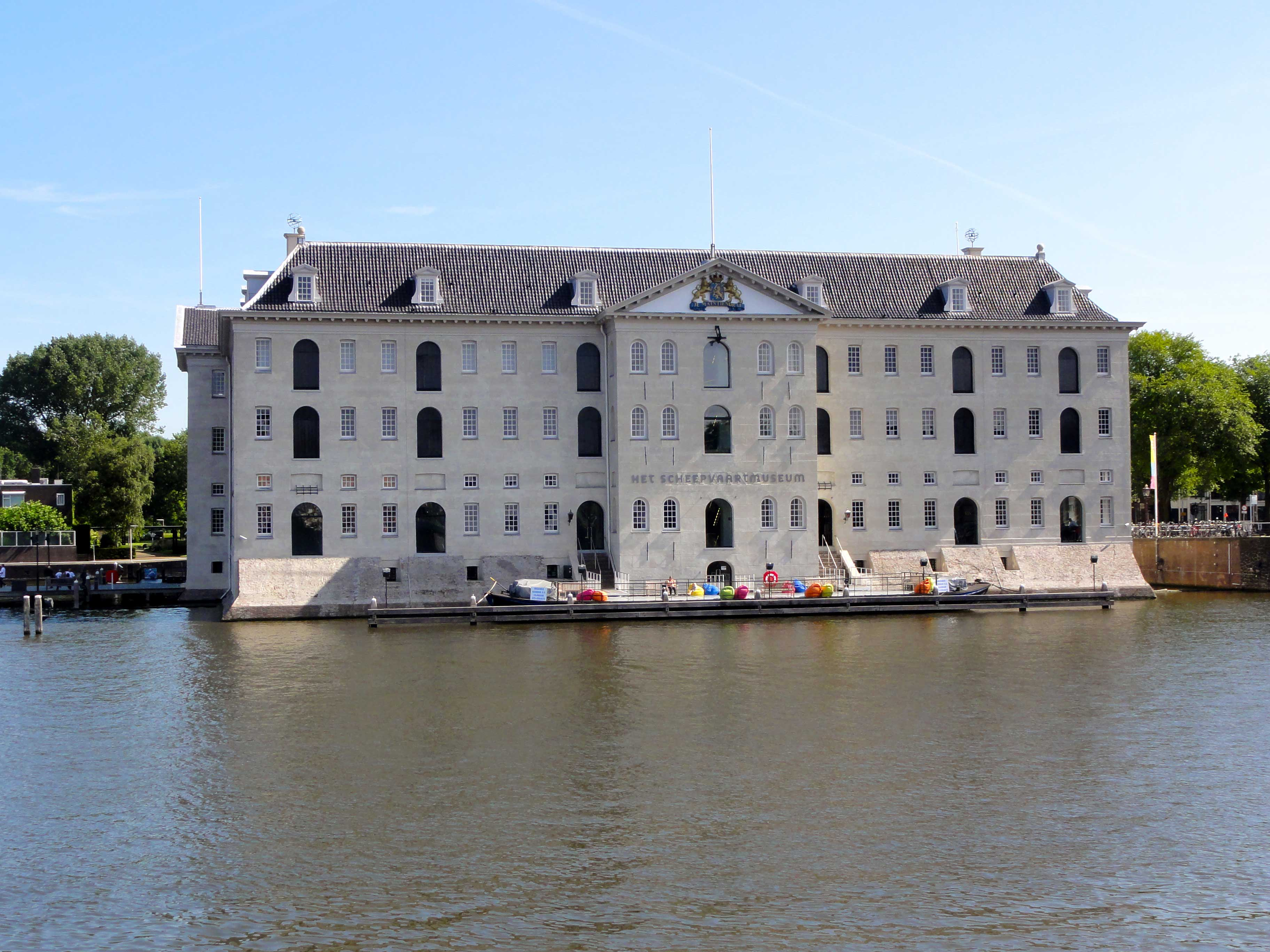
's Lands Zeemagazijn (arsenal) in 2012

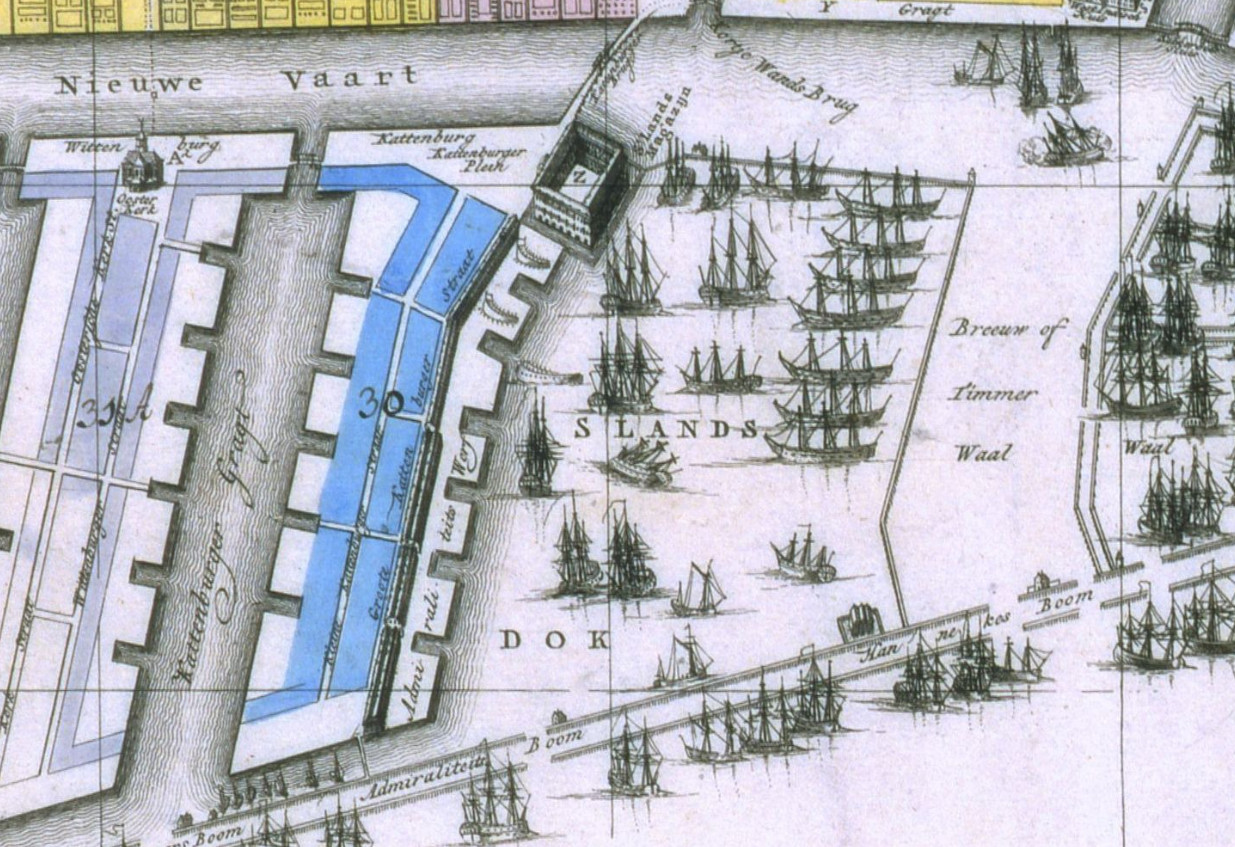
The yard viewed from the north, late 18th century, by Mortier Covens en Zoon

In the time of the Dutch republic naval affairs were handled by 5 local admiralties. The Admiralty of Amsterdam was the most important of these. The First Anglo-Dutch War proved the need for a professional navy. On 12 August 1655, the admiralty therefore got the entire western strip of Kattenburg island for the construction of an arsenal and ship yard. The arsenal was quickly constructed on the southern extremity of Kattenburg island in 1656. It was called 's Lands Zeemagazijn and now houses the National Maritime Museum.

The rest of Kattenburg island stretches north along the Kattenburgerstraat. On the west side of this street the former yard is still enclosed by a very long seventeenth century building and a long old wall that reaches almost to the north end of Kattenburg Island. The slipways of the yard were immediately on the other (west) side of this enclosure.

From the arsenal and the north end of Kattenburg, dams reached to the west, and enclosed an almost square stretch of water called 's lands Dok. In this dock the ships of the admiralty could lay In ordinary. This was the usual condition for warships in the time of the Dutch republic. Upper parts of the mast, most of the rigging, sails, guns etc. were removed, and stored in the adjacent arsenal. Almost the whole the dock has now been filled up, and is occupied by modern buildings.

=== State ship yard in the French period ===
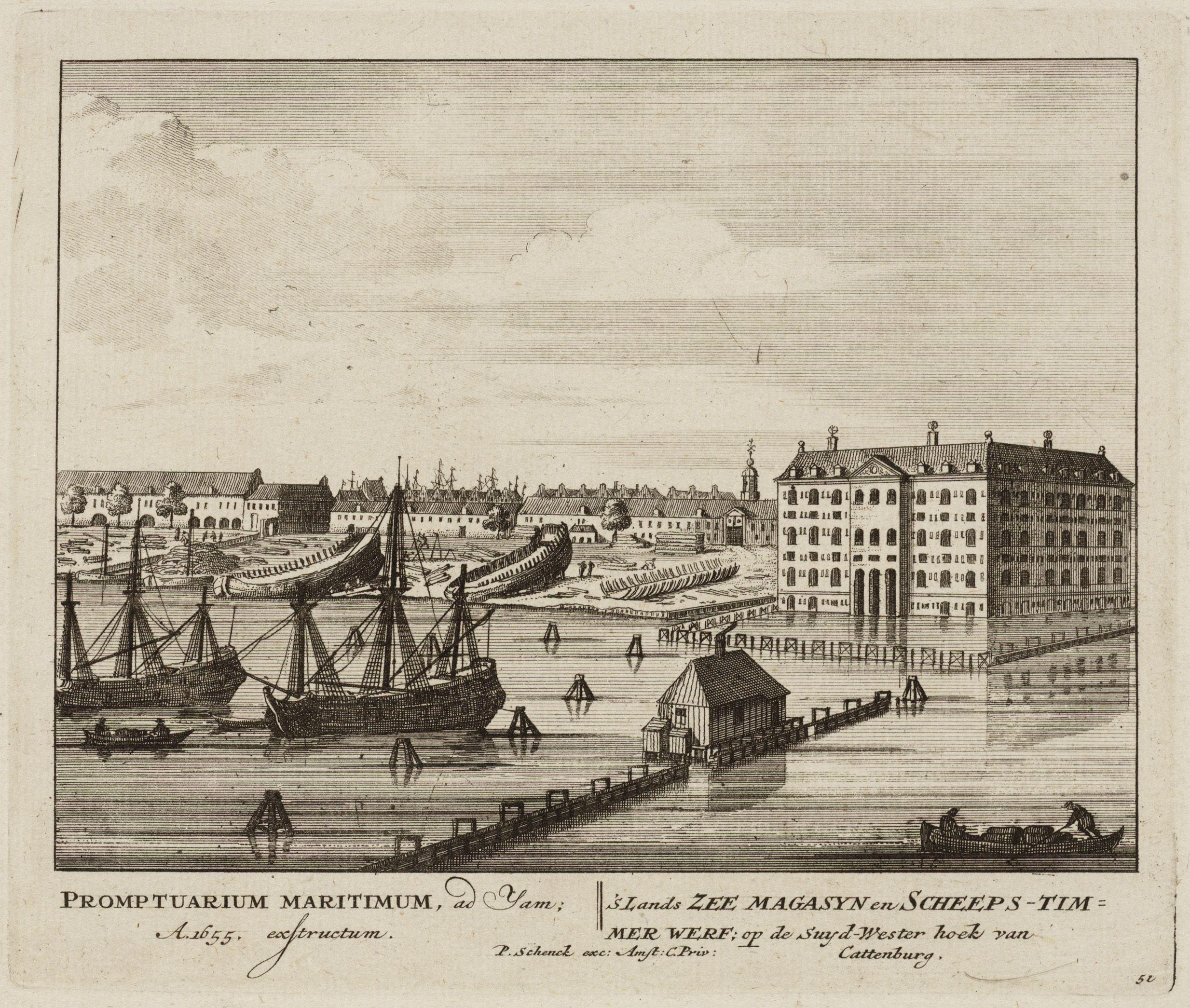
The slipways are left (north) of the arsenal, behind these the enclosure, c. 1710

The events of 1795 created the Batavian Republic, the start of the French period in the Netherlands. The admiralties were replaced by a national committee for naval affairs. It meant that all assets of the admiralties were nationalized, leading to 5 state ship yards. In 1806 the Kingdom of Holland became the owner of the shipyard. In 1811 this kingdom was annexed by Napoleon's empire, making the yard an imperial French ship yard. This came to an end in late 1813, when the Netherlands became independent again. The French period was a disaster for Dutch shipping. It could have become a disaster for the yard, because of the construction of Willemsoord, a naval base near Den Helder, and a possible competitor.

== The Rijkswerf ==
=== Ship yard in the United Kingdom of the Netherlands ===
The founding of the United Kingdom of the Netherlands in 1815 meant a new start for 's Rijks Werf (national yard) Amsterdam. However, the context of 1815 was very different from that of 1795. The French time had been utterly ruinous for the Dutch economy. It caused that the nation could no longer afford a naval budget comparable to that of major European powers. Apart from that, the United Kingdom of the Netherlands was a state focusing on its place in a coalition that should keep France in check, and was therefore focused on its army.

General circumstances were not conducive for much activity on the yard, but on a national scale the Rijkswerf Amsterdam was lucky. While Willemsoord remained as a naval base and was greatly expanded, the proponents of moving shipbuilding over there did not get their way. Most of the few new ships of the line and frigates that were built, were laid down in Amsterdam again, with Vlissingen and Rotterdam also having a share. In 1816 the remnants of the 'competing' navy yard in Harlingen were sold. In 1828 the Rijkswerf Medemblik was shut down.

=== A difficult start (1830-1850) ===
The united kingdom broke up in 1830. The final acts were the Ten Days' Campaign, the Siege of Antwerp (1832) and an English fleet blockading the Dutch coast, all ruinous for the state's finances. The secession of Belgium also stripped the coal and iron deposits from the Dutch state, a further disaster during the Industrial Revolution. It all led to rigorous economizing on the navy. The Rijkswerf Rotterdam would close in 1850. Meanwhile, the Rijkswerf Amsterdam built a lot of small paddle steamers.

=== Screw Propulsion (1850-1860) ===
By the early 1850s the only Dutch state yards left were those in Vlissingen and Amsterdam. Meanwhile, the Dutch state had found a new source of wealth in the Cultivation System implemented in the East Indies. It meant that more money became available for the navy, and investments went to these two establishments. This was just as well, because the invention of screw propulsion had just obsoleted the entire fleet of sail and paddle-steam ships that the Dutch had. The biggest screw ships that the Dutch needed, the steam frigates, were built in Vlissingen because of their draught. The Rijkswerf would build a large number of steam corvettes.

== Facilities for armoring ships ==
When foreign powers started to armor their ships, the Dutch authorities decided to create facilities for armoring in Vlissingen, not in Amsterdam. This was a sound decision, because Vlissingen was the only Dutch harbor that had access to water deep enough to launch ships that could stand up to the biggest ships that foreign powers brought to bear.

In 1867 the Dutch government decided to move the armoring facilities to the Rijkswerf Amsterdam. This decision had to do with the overall defensive strategy that centered on only defending the places behind the Dutch Water Line.

== Building armored ships ==
The first armored ships that the Rijkswerf Amsterdam constructed were copies of foreign ships that the Dutch navy had purchased. HNLMS Cerberus is a prime example.

Later ships were built to Dutch designs. The yard built among others ironclads, protected cruisers, coastal defense ships, gunboats, monitors and unprotected cruisers.

== The end of the Rijkswerf Amsterdam ==
In 1915 the Rijkswerf Amsterdam ceased to exist.

== Ships built on the Rijkswerf ==
Ship	Type	Launched	Disp.	Notes
Medusa	Steam Corvette	1854	1241	First Dutch warship with screw propulsion.
Wassenaar	Steam Frigate	1856	3650	First steam powered frigate of the RNLN. First big training ship 1876–1904. Sold for scrap 1913.
Citadel van Antwerpen	Steam Corvette	1857	1780	
Vice Admiraal Koopman	Steam Corvette	1858	1600	
Djambi	Steam Corvette	1860	2030	
Zoutman	Steam Corvette	1861	2030	
Metalen Kruis	Steam Corvette	1862	2030	
Willem	Steam Corvette	1863	2030	
Watergeus	Screw Sloop-of-War	1864	1405	
Marnix	Screw Sloop-of-War	1867	1488	
Cerberus	Monitor	1869	1584	First purpose-built ironclad laid down in the Netherlands.
Zilveren Kruis	Steam Corvette	1869	2160	
Bloedhond	Monitor	1869	1683	
Guinea	Ironclad	1870	2198	Sold for scrap 1897
Hyena	Monitor	1870	1594	
Panter	Monitor	1870	1594	
Wesp	Monitor	1871	1606	
Van Galen	Steam Corvette	1872	2160	
Koning der Nederlanden	Ironclad	1874	5400	Scuttled 2 March 1942
All six Atjeh-class cruisers	Unprotected cruiser	1876-86	3425	
Draak	Monitor	1877	2204	
Nautilus	Sail Corvette	1885	967	A steel ship, was laid down on 27 August 1884 at the ¨Rijkswerf¨ in Amsterdam, the Netherlands. She was launched on 24 June 1885 and taken into service on 16 February 1886 as training ship of the RNLN. She was taken out of service on 1 April 1908 and converted to be used consecutively as lodging and training ship until 1926 when she was permanently taken out of service.
Reinier Claeszen	Monitor	1891	2490	
Koningin Wilhelmina der Nederlanden	Protected cruiser	1892	4530	Scrapped in 1910
Kortenaer	Coastal defence ship	1894	3464	
Holland	Protected cruiser	1896	3900	
Utrecht	Protected cruiser	1898	4033	Was laid down on 22 July 1897 at the ¨Rijkswerf¨ in Amsterdam, the Netherlands, launched on 14 July 1898 and taken into service on 1 March 1901. She was taken out of service on 12 September 1905, overhauled during 1906–1907 at the ¨Rijkswerf¨ in Amsterdam and put into service again on 13 October 1908. Sold to be dismantled on 28 May 1913 in Amsterdam.
Koningin Regentes	Coastal defence ship	1900	5002	
Hertog Hendrik	Coastal defence ship	1902	5002	
Marten Harpertszoon Tromp	Coastal defence ship	1904	5210	
Jacob van Heemskerck	Coastal defence ship	1906	4920	
De Zeven Provinciën	Coastal defence ship	1909	6530	
All three Brinio-class gunboats	Gunboat	1912–13	530-545	

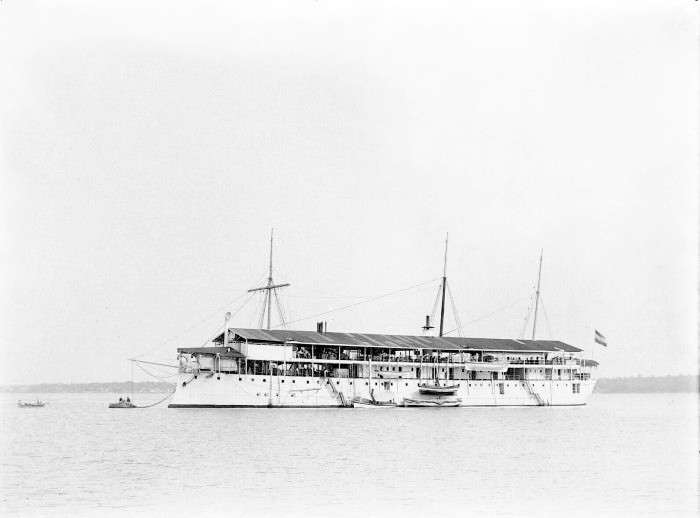
Koningin der Nederlanden

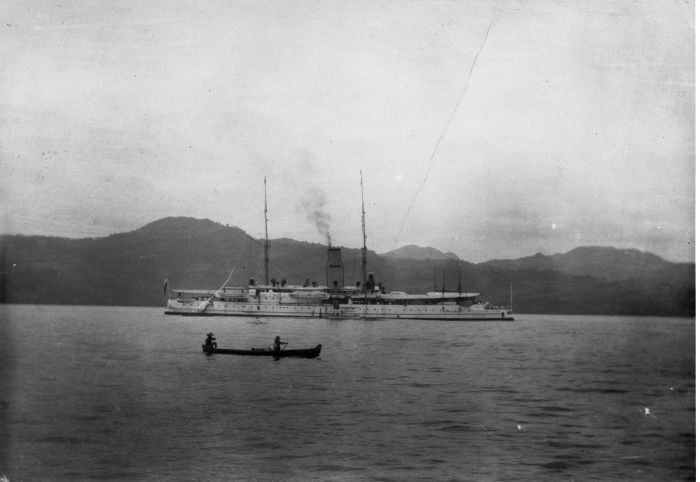
Koningin Wilhelmina der Nederlanden

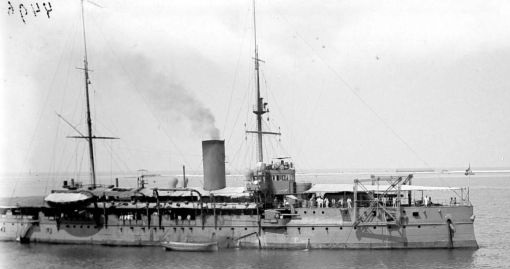
Hertog Hendrik

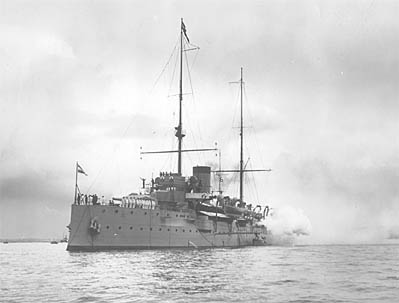
Marten Harpertszoon Tromp

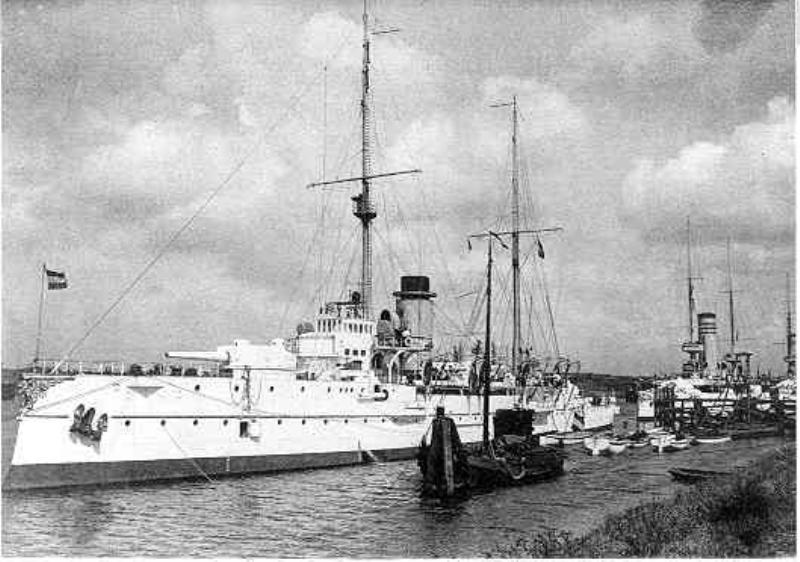
Jacob van Heemskerck

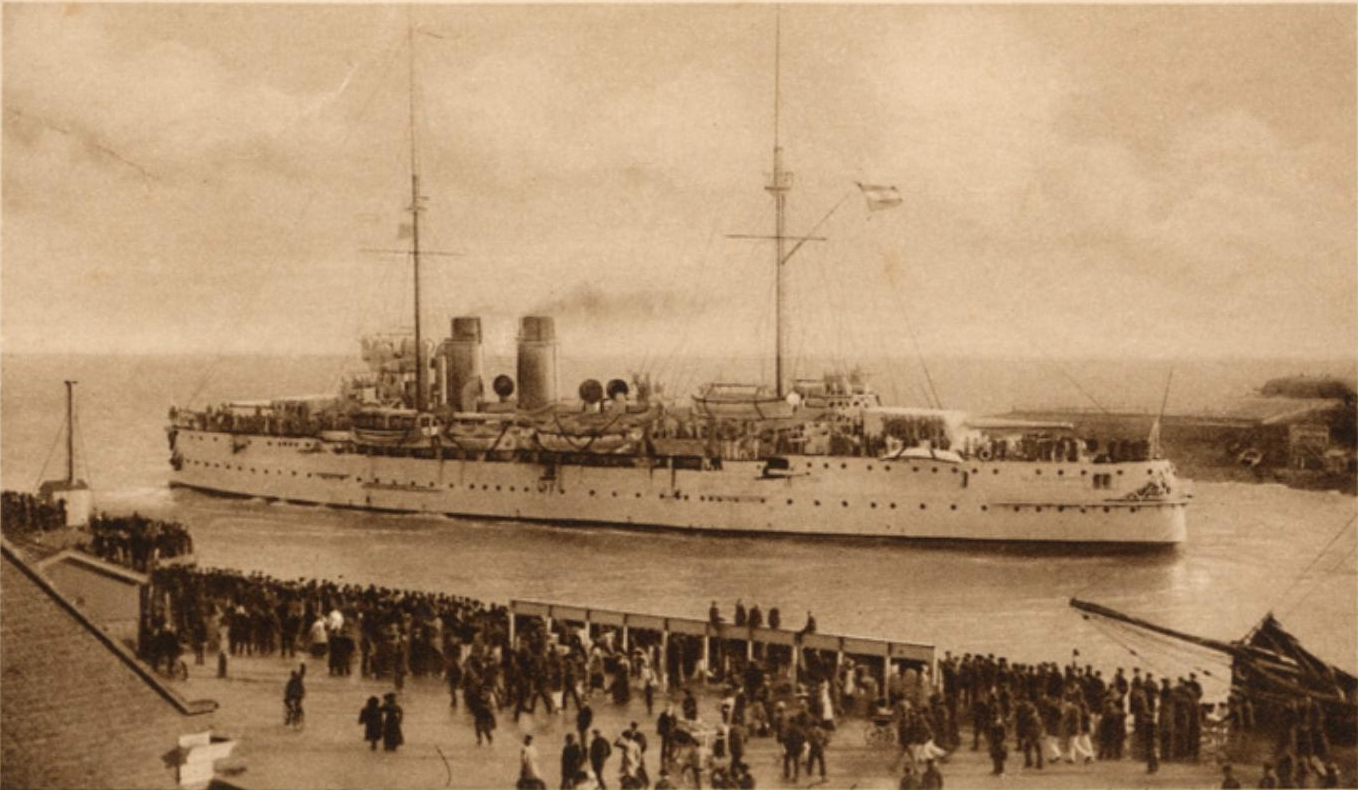
De Zeven Provinciën

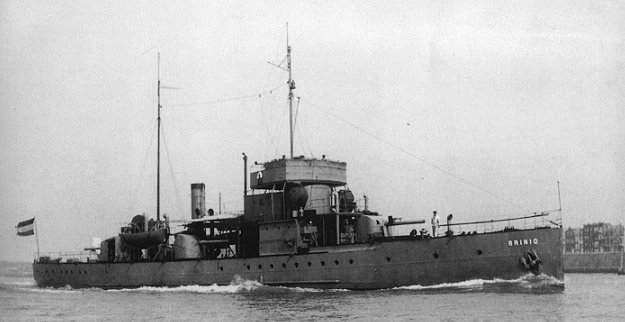
Brino

== Notes ==
=== Bibliography ===
- Lemmers, A.A. (May 2006). "Blinde vlek in de stad: De marinebasis te Amsterdam" (PDF). Marineblad (in Dutch). Vol. 116, no. 3. pp. 28–31.
