= HNLMS Koningin Regentes =

Koningin Regentes-class coastal defence ship

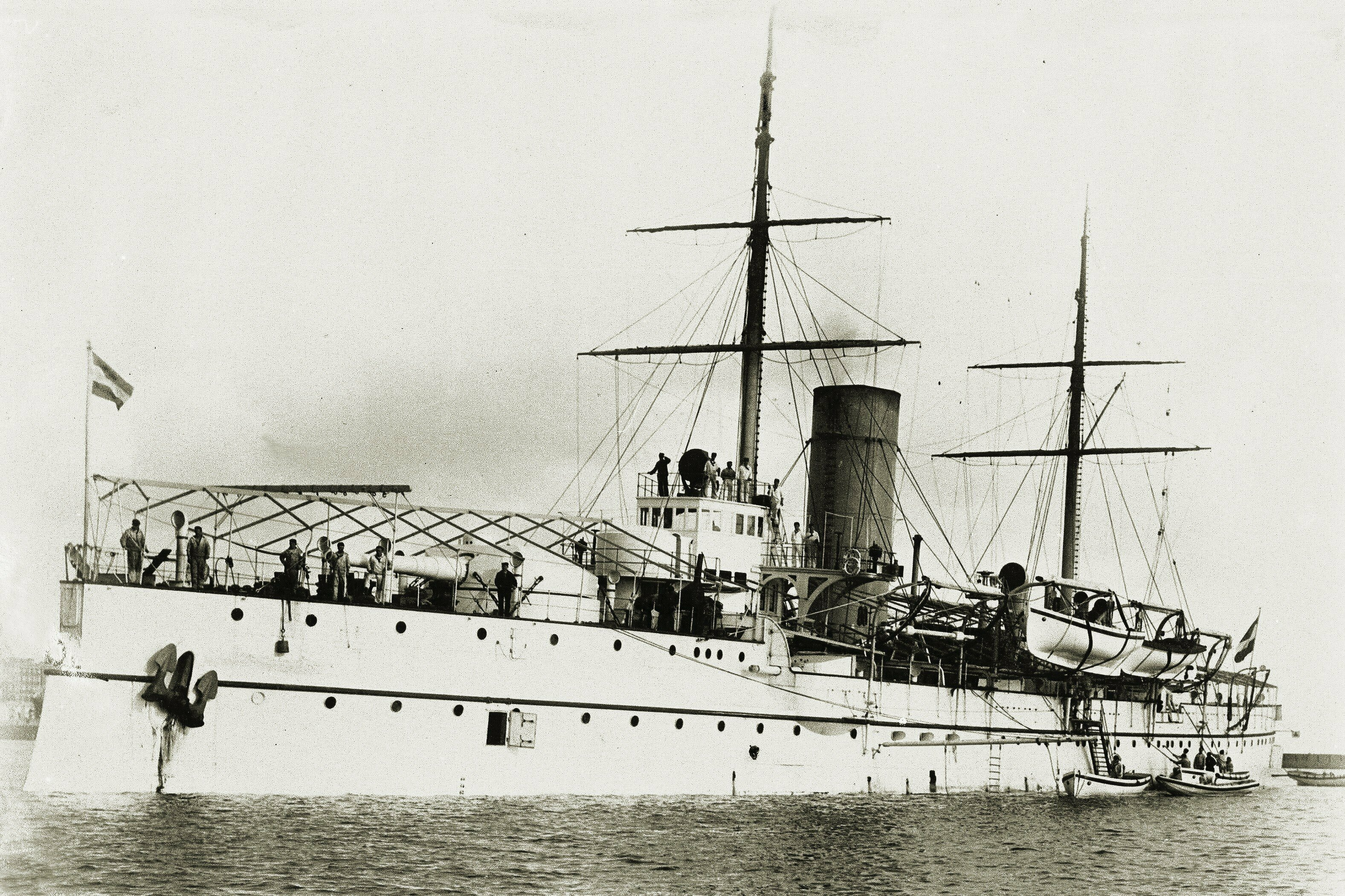
- Koningin Regentes

History

Netherlands
- Name: Koningin Regentes
- Namesake: Queen Regent Emma of Waldeck and Pyrmont
- Builder: Rijkswerf in Amsterdam
- Laid down: 1898
- Launched: 24 April 1900
- Commissioned: 3 January 1902
- Decommissioned: 1920
- Fate: Scrapped

General characteristics
- Class & type: Koningin Regentes-class coastal defence ship
- Displacement: 5,002 tons
- Length: 96.622 m (317 ft 0 in)
- Beam: 15.189 m (49 ft 10 in)
- Draught: 5.817 m (19 ft 1 in)
- Installed power: 6,500 ihp (4,800 kW)
- Propulsion: 2 shafts, reciprocating engines
- Speed: 16.5 knots (30.6 km/h; 19.0 mph)
- Complement: 340
- Armament: 2 × 9.4 in (24 cm) (2 × 1); 4 × 15 cm (5.9 in) (4 × 1); 8 × 7.5 cm (3.0 in) (8 × 1); 4 × 1pdr (4 × 1); 3 × 45 cm (18 in) torpedo tubes
- Armour: 6 in (15 cm) belt; 10 in (25 cm) barbette; 10 in (25 cm) turret

HNLMS Koningin Regentes (Dutch: Hr.Ms. Koningin Regentes) was a Koningin Regentes-class coastal defence ship (pantserschip) of the Royal Netherlands Navy. The ship was built at the Rijkswerf in Amsterdam at the start of the twentieth century. After the eruption of the Mount Pelée volcano on the French island of Martinique the ship provided assistance to the casualties, and then later participated in an expedition to the island of Bali in 1906. She made several journeys to show the Dutch flag and was finally decommissioned in 1920.

== Design ==
The ship was 96.622 metres (317 ft 0 in) long, had a beam of 15.189 metres (49 ft 10 in), a draught of 5.817 metres (19 ft 1 in), and had a displacement of 5,002 tons. The ship was equipped with 2-shaft reciprocating engines, which were rated at 6,500 ihp (4,800 kW) and produced a top speed of 16.5 knots (30.6 km/h). Her belt armour was 6 in (15 cm) thick, while she also had 10 in (25 cm) of barbette armour and 10 in (25 cm) turret armour. Two 9.4 in (24 cm) single turret guns provided the ship's main armament, and these were augmented by four single 15 cm (5.9 in) guns and eight 7.5 cm (3.0 in) single guns. The ship had a complement of 340 men.

== Service history ==
After being laid down in 1898, Koningen Regentes was built at the Rijkswerf in Amsterdam and launched on 24 April 1900. The ship was christened there by the Dutch Queen Mother, Emma of Waldeck and Pyrmont and was then commissioned into the Royal Netherlands Navy on 3 January 1902.

On 11 March that year she departed from the port of Vlissingen bound for the Dutch West Indies in response to rising political tension between the Netherlands and Venezuela to evacuate the Jews of Coro to Curaçao. She interrupted this journey to assist and help the casualties of the Mount Pelée volcano eruption on the French island of Martinique. After this, the ship continued her journey in concert with HNLMS Utrecht and on 2 April 1902 they arrived in the Venezuelan port of La Guaira. Prior to their arrival, the Venezuelan Navy had repeatedly checked Dutch and Antillean merchant ships and the presence of the Dutch warships acted as a deterrent against further actions.

In 1906 Koningin Regentes, along with her sister ship HNLMS De Ruyter and the protected cruiser HNLMS Zeeland, assisted in an expedition to the island of Bali in the Dutch East Indies as part of Dutch attempts to integrate the southern kingdoms of Tabanan, Badung and Klungkung into the Dutch East Indies. On 16 and 17 September, the ships bombarded the city of Denpasar and afterwards ground forces broke what resistance remained.

10 August 1909 the ship, together with HNLMS Maarten Harpertszoon Tromp and De Ruyter, departed from Batavia to China, Hong Kong, Japan and the Philippines to show the flag. The following year the ship undertook a cruise to Australia to show the flag. After leaving Surabaya on 15 August 1910, Koningin Regentes and both her sister ships, De Ruyter and HNLMS Hertog Hendrik, visited the ports of Brisbane, Melbourne, Sydney, Fremantle and several others.

On 4 April 1918, during the final stages of World War I, the ship and the HNLMS De Zeven Provinciën escorted the passenger ships Vondel, Kawi, Rindjani and Grotius to the port of Tanjung Priok. The ships were intercepted in the eastern parts of the Indian archipelago by the two warships after Dutch merchant ships had been confiscated by British and American naval forces, exercising the Angary right.

The ship was finally decommissioned in 1920.
