= 15 cm K (E) =

15 cm Kanone (E)
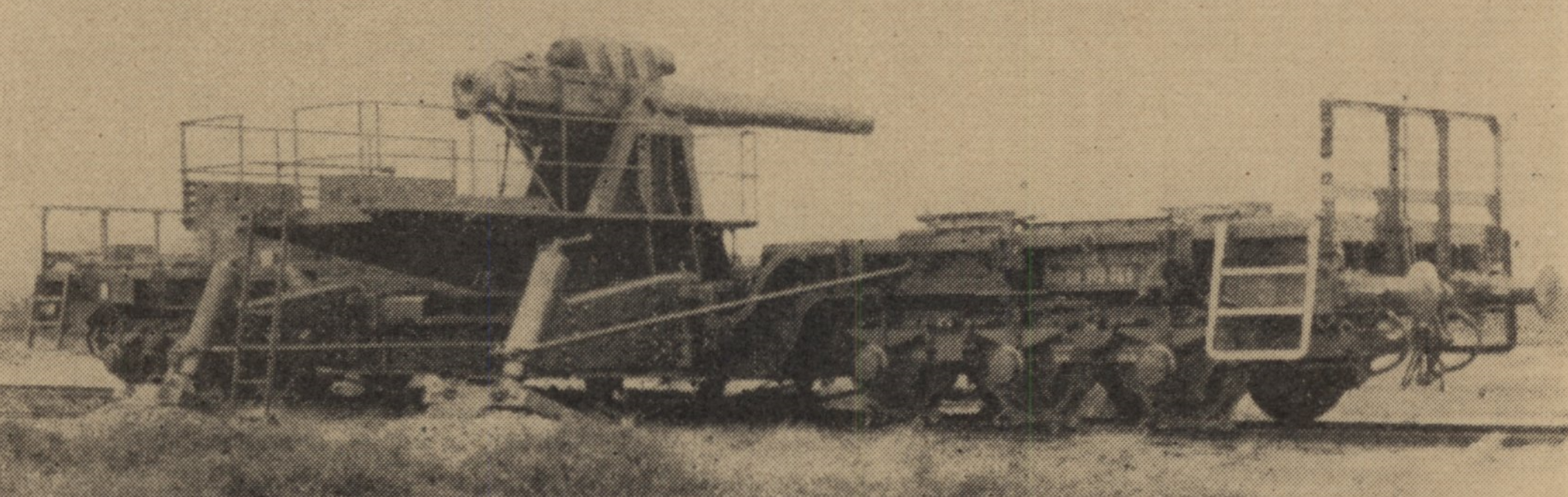
- 15 cm K (E) in 1943
- Type: Railway Gun
- Place of origin: Germany

Service history
- Used by: Nazi Germany
- Wars: World War II

Production history
- Designer: Krupp
- Designed: 1937
- Manufacturer: Krupp
- Produced: 1937
- No. built: 4

Specifications
- Mass: 74 tonnes (73 long tons; 82 short tons)
- Length: 20.1 metres (66 ft)
- Shell: separate-loading, cased charge
- Caliber: 149.3 millimetres (5.88 in)
- Breech: vertical sliding-block
- Elevation: +10° - +45°
- Traverse: 360°
- Muzzle velocity: 600–805 metres per second (1,970–2,640 ft/s)
- Maximum firing range: 22.5 kilometres (24,600 yd)

The 15 cm Kanone in Eisenbahnlafette (gun on railroad mounting) (15 cm K (E)) was a type of German railroad gun used in the Second World War. They were used in the invasion of Belgium in 1940, but spent most of the war on coast-defense duties.

== Design ==
This weapon was the first modern railroad gun to enter service with the Heer. The gun was mounted on a simple pivot mount on a ballrace on a well-base flatcar with four outriggers. In action the outriggers and their jacks would be dropped to stabilize the gun and absorb the firing recoil. In addition jacks locked the spring suspension, bore on the surface of the rails and screw clamps gripped the rails for more stability. The elderly 15 cm Schnelladekanone L/40 was used because it was available in some numbers.

== Ammunition ==
The standard high-explosive shell was the 15 cm K Gr 18, a 43 kilograms (95 lb) nose-fuzed round containing 5.68 kilograms (12.5 lb) of TNT. An anti-concrete shell was also available, the 15 cm Gr 19 Be. It was a base-fuzed 43.5 kilograms (96 lb) shell with a TNT filler of 4.8 kilograms (11 lb), with a rounded sheet-steel ballistic cap. A base propellant charge was combined with three increments to form three standard loadings, Small Load (Kleine Ladung) with a muzzle velocity of 600 metres per second (2,000 ft/s), Medium (Mittelere) with a muzzle velocity of 725 metres per second (2,380 ft/s) and Large (Grosse) with a muzzle velocity of 805 metres per second (2,640 ft/s).

== Combat history ==
Two guns were damaged by premature detonations in their barrels on 20 May 1940 while bombarding Liège. They spent most of the war assigned to Artillery Battery (Artillerie-Batterie) 655 (E) in Belgium on coast-defense duties along the Channel coast.

== Note ==
Sources are contradictory on the gun used and numbers produced of this weapon. The most recent source, François, has been generally been followed, not least because he cites serial numbers. Do not confuse this gun with those of Naval Artillery Battery (Marine-Artillerie-Batterie) "Gneisenau" that used a slightly more modern 15 cm SK L/45 gun with a gun shield.
