= HNLMS Hertog Hendrik =

Koningin Regentes-class coastal defence ship

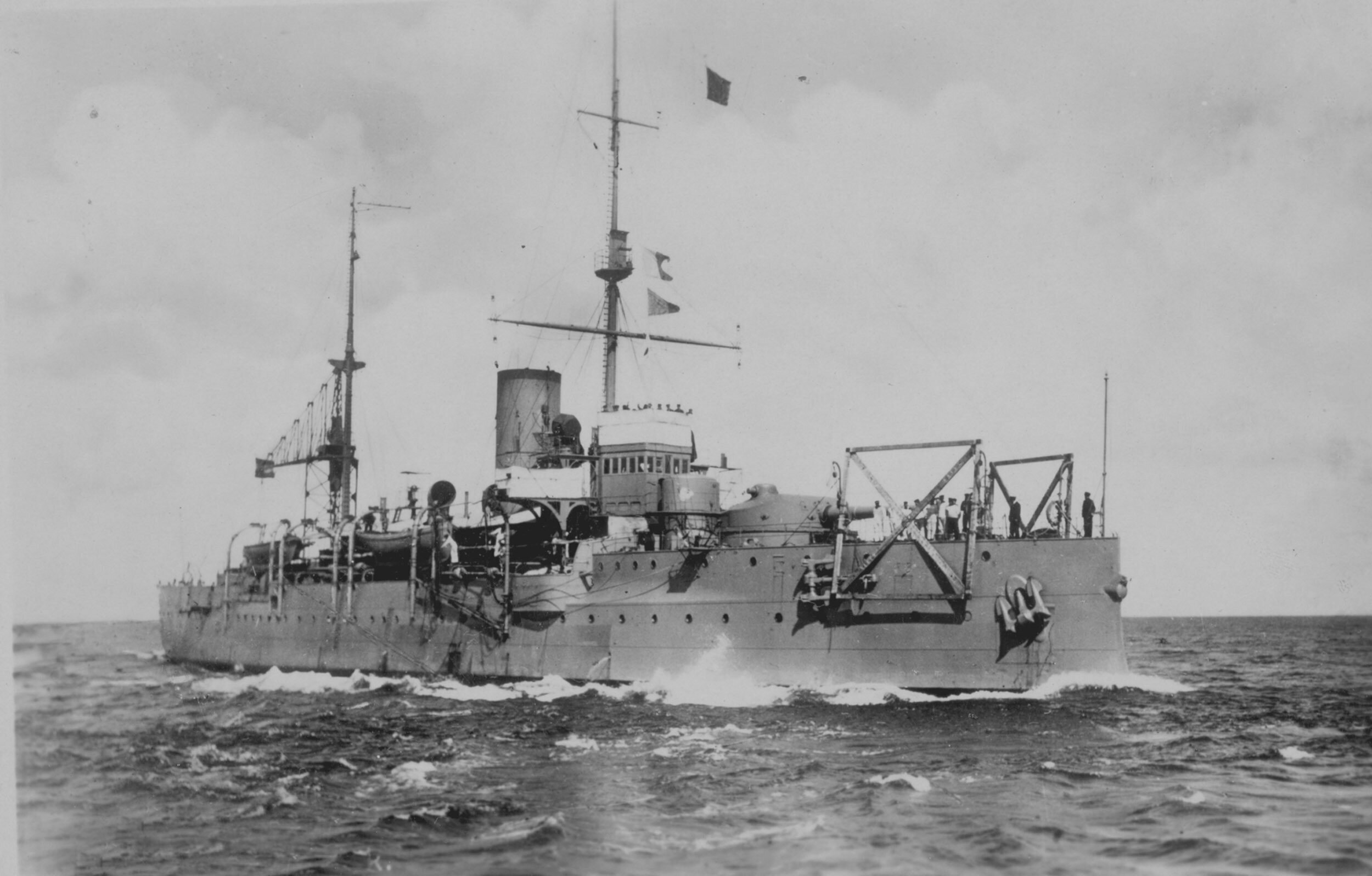
- Hertog Hendrik

History

Netherlands
- Name: Hertog Hendrik
- Namesake: Duke Henry of Mecklenburg-Schwerin
- Builder: Rijkswerf in Amsterdam
- Laid down: 8 March 1901
- Launched: 7 June 1902
- Commissioned: 5 January 1904
- Recommissioned: 21 October 1947
- Decommissioned: 27 September 1968
- Renamed: Batterijschip Vliereede (1939); Hertog Hendrik (1947)
- Reclassified: Floating battery ship, 1939; Accommodation ship, 1947
- Stricken: 28 August 1969
- Fate: Scrapped

Nazi Germany
- Name: Ariadne
- Namesake: Ariadne
- Acquired: 14 May 1940
- Commissioned: 1943
- Reclassified: Anti-aircraft battery, 1943
- Fate: Handed back to the Netherlands after VE Day

General characteristics
- Class & type: Koningin Regentes-class coastal defence ship
- Displacement: 5,002 tons
- Length: 96.622 m (317 ft 0 in)
- Beam: 15.189 m (49 ft 10 in)
- Draught: 5.817 m (19 ft 1 in)
- Installed power: 6,500 ihp (4,800 kW)
- Propulsion: 2 shafts, 2 reciprocating engines
- Speed: 16.5 knots (30.6 km/h; 19.0 mph)
- Complement: 340
- Sensors & processing systems: as Ariadne; FuMO 213
- Armament: as Hertog Hendrik; 2 × 9.4 in (24 cm) (2 × 1); 4 × 15 cm (5.9 in) (4 × 1); 8 × 7.5 cm (3.0 in) (8 × 1); 4 × 1pdr (4 × 1); 3 × 45 cm (18 in) torpedo tubes; as Ariadne; 8 × 10.5 cm (4.1 in) (8 × 1); 5 × 4 cm (1.6 in) (2 × 2, 1 × 1); 4 × quad 2 cm (0.79 in)
- Armour: 6 in (15 cm) belt; 10 in (25 cm) barbette; 10 in (25 cm) turret

HNLMS Hertog Hendrik (Dutch: Hr.Ms. Hertog Hendrik) was a Koningin Regentes-class coastal defence ship (pantserschip) of the Royal Netherlands Navy. The ship was built at the Rijkswerf in Amsterdam at the start of the twentieth century. She was the first ship in the Dutch navy to be equipped with wireless communication. The ship took part in two expeditions to South Celebes and during the Spanish Civil War she performed convoy duties. During World War II she was captured by the invading German forces and converted into an anti-aircraft battery. After the war the ship was recovered and given back to the Netherlands, to be converted into an accommodation ship.

== Design ==
The ship was 96.622 meters (317 ft) long, had a beam of 15.189 m (50 ft), a draught of 5.817 m (19 ft), and had a displacement of 5,002 tons. The ship was equipped with 2-shaft reciprocating engines, which were rated at 4,800 kW (6,500 ihp) and produced a top speed of 16.5 knots (30.6 km/h). Her belt armour was 150 mm (6 in) thick, while she also had 250 mm (10 in) of barbette armour and 250 mm (10 in) turret armour. Two 240 mm (9.4 in) single turret guns provided the ship's main armament, and these were augmented by four single 150 mm (5.9 in) guns and eight 75 mm (3 in) single guns. The ship had a complement of 340 men.

== Service history ==
Hertog Hendrik was laid down on 8 March 1901 by the Dutch Queen Mother, Emma of Waldeck and Pyrmont at the Rijkswerf in Amsterdam.

The ship was launched and christened there by, Prince Henry on 7 June 1902. She was commissioned into the Royal Netherlands Navy on 5 January 1904 and the first ship in the Dutch navy to be equipped with wireless communication. This wireless Telefunken radio installation had a range of 200 kilometers. The ship left Den Helder on 9 November 1904 for the Dutch East Indies. Shortly after she had departed she send the first Dutch wireless telegram.

On 24 June 1905 Hertog Hendrik hit a coral reef near Matjidosteen while en route to the Gulf of Boni. The cruiser Zeeland made several attempts to pull the stranded ship loose, but these proved unsuccessful and were abandoned when Zeeland's bollards broke. The ship was later pulled clear after her sister ship De Ruyter and Japara, a ship with towing equipment from the Koninklijke Paketvaart Maatschappij, arrived and Hertog Hendrik's coal, reserves and munitions were offloaded. Later that year the ship took part in two expeditions to South Celebes. The first expedition was undertaken against the lord of Boni. Armed sloops of Hertog Hendrik, Zeeland and Assahan protected the landing of Dutch forces near Patiro on 20 July 1905.

During the second expedition on 11 September De Ruyter, Hertog Hendrik, Borneo, Serdang and two ships of the Koninklijke Paketvaart Maatschappij where engaged in operations against the lord of Loewoe an ally of the lord of Boni. An infantry battalion and a marine landing party were set ashore near Palopo and later that day the soldiers and marines took the lord's palace.

In 1910 the ship together with the cruiser Holland escorted another cruiser, Noordbrabant, that had hit a cliff on 31 May while en route to Surabaya. The collision caused the flooding of several compartment of the ship. Damaged as she was, Noordbrabant continued to sail without aid.

Later that year the ship undertook a cruise to Australia to show the flag. After leaving Surabaya on 15 August 1910, Hertog Hendrik and both her sister ships, De Ruyter and Koningin Regentes, visited the ports of Brisbane, Melbourne, Sydney, Fremantle and several others.

Hertog Hendrik and Noordam deployed as auxiliary cruiser left the Netherlands on 16 February 1918 as convoy to the Dutch East Indies. They planned to take the route through the Panama Canal. North of Scotland the ships encountered a heavy storm and were forced to return to make necessary repairs. The ships arrived on 19 March in Den Helder. On 5 July that year a second attempt was made to reach the Dutch East Indies by going around Scotland and Cape of Good Hope. This time the convoy consisted of Hertog Hendrik, Tabanan deployed as auxiliary cruiser, Bengkalis deployed as coaling ship and Noordam. The convoy reached Tanjung Priok, Dutch East Indies on 27 September that year.

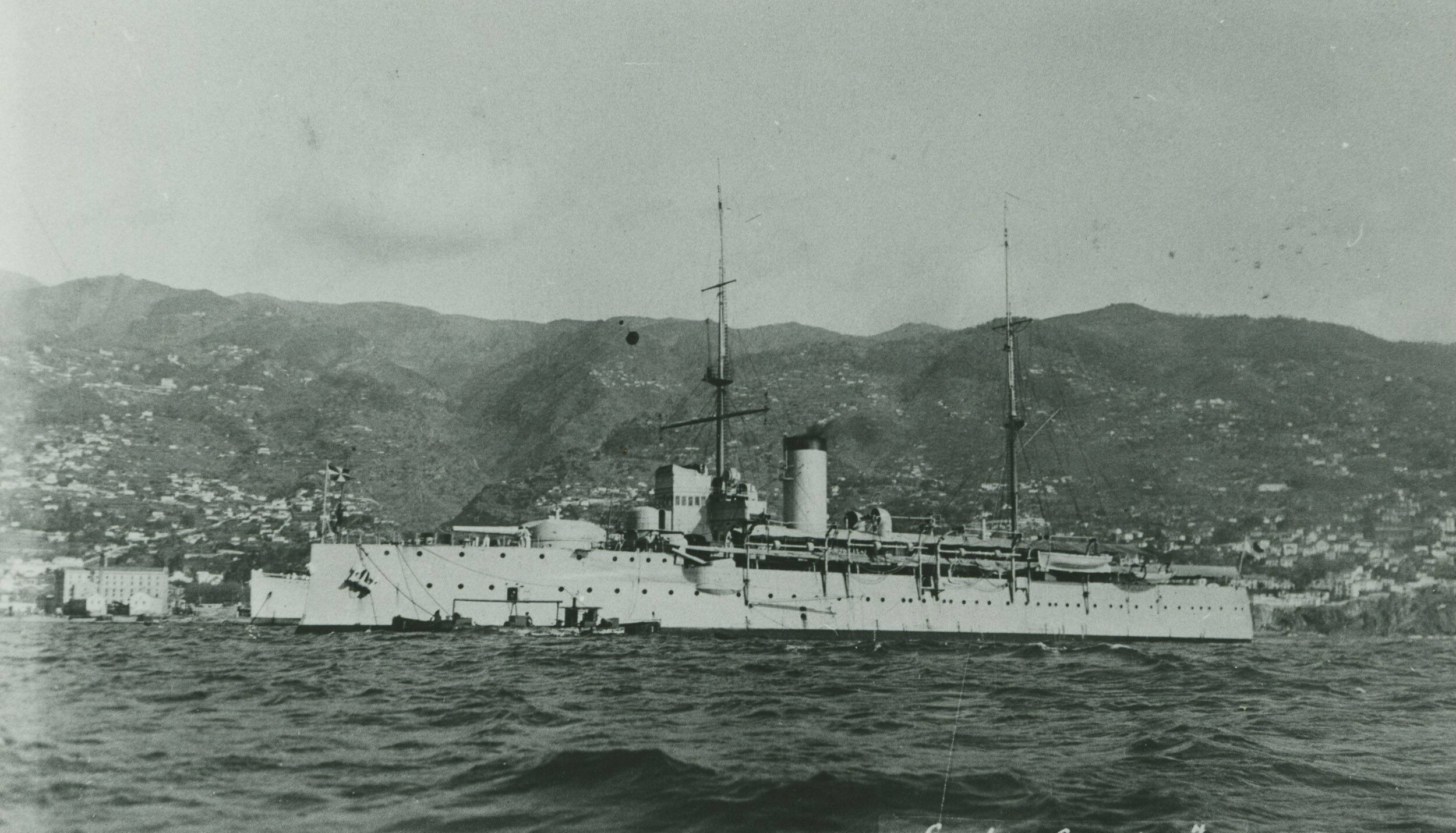
Hertog Hendrik off of the coast of Madeira in 1935

On 2 March 1920 she and Marten Harpertszoon Tromp departed from Den Helder for a four-month journey to Asia to show the flag. They visited the ports of Singapore, Saigon, Hong Kong, Shanghai, Kobe and Manila.

In 1926 Hertog Hendrik was converted to a training ship, with the aft 240 mm turret and the torpedo tubes removed, while in 1928 she was fitted to operate aircraft, with a large latticework crane added to handle the two floatplanes carried.

On 27 March 1934 the ship entered the harbor of Den Helder. The ship and crew had just returned from gunnery practice during the first three months of 1934 in the Mediterranean Sea and 19 February the ship had made an official visit to Venice. Later that year during the Open Day of the Navy in Scheveningen the ship and crew gave a demonstration with searchlights.

During the Spanish Civil War she performed convoy duties, escorting Dutch merchant ships through the Straits of Gibraltar between March 1937 and September 1938.

Video of submarine O16 passing HNLMS Hertog Hendrik in 1937. Dutch newsreel.

=== World War II ===
From 3 August to 4 November 1939 the ship served as floating battery ship Batterijschip Vliereede off Vlieland, and was then moved to Den Helder and paid off to serve as an accommodation ship for the Naval College.

The floating hulk was scuttled on 14 May 1940, immediately prior to capture by the invading German forces. The ship had not been disarmed and still had a partially operational engine at this time. The ship was further damaged on the night of 21/22 June 1940, when Den Helder was bombed by Lockheed Hudsons of 206 Squadron RAF, with a near miss causing progressive flooding and leaving Vlierede grounded and with a heavy list. The Germans decided to salvage her in October 1940 and converted her into an Anti Aircraft battery at Antwerp. The conversion lasted from 1941 to 1943 and the ship was renamed Ariadne. After the war the ship was recovered in Wilhelmshaven and given back to the Netherlands, to be converted at the Wilton-Fijenoord shipyard into an accommodation ship. On 21 October 1947 she was recommissioned and given back her initial name Hertog Hendrik. She was finally decommissioned on 27 September 1968 and stricken from the navy list on 28 August 1969.

== Bibliography ==
- Dodson, Aidan & Nottlemann, Dirk (2025). "The German Flak Ships Part II: The Former Dutch and Danish Hulls". In Jordan, John (ed.). Warship 2025. London: Bloomsbury Publishing Plc. pp. 172–185. ISBN 978-1-4728-6854-1.
- Lenton, H. T. (1968). Royal Netherlands Navy. Navies of the Second World War. Macdonald & Co. (Publishers) Ltd.
