= Protected cruiser =

Type of naval warship

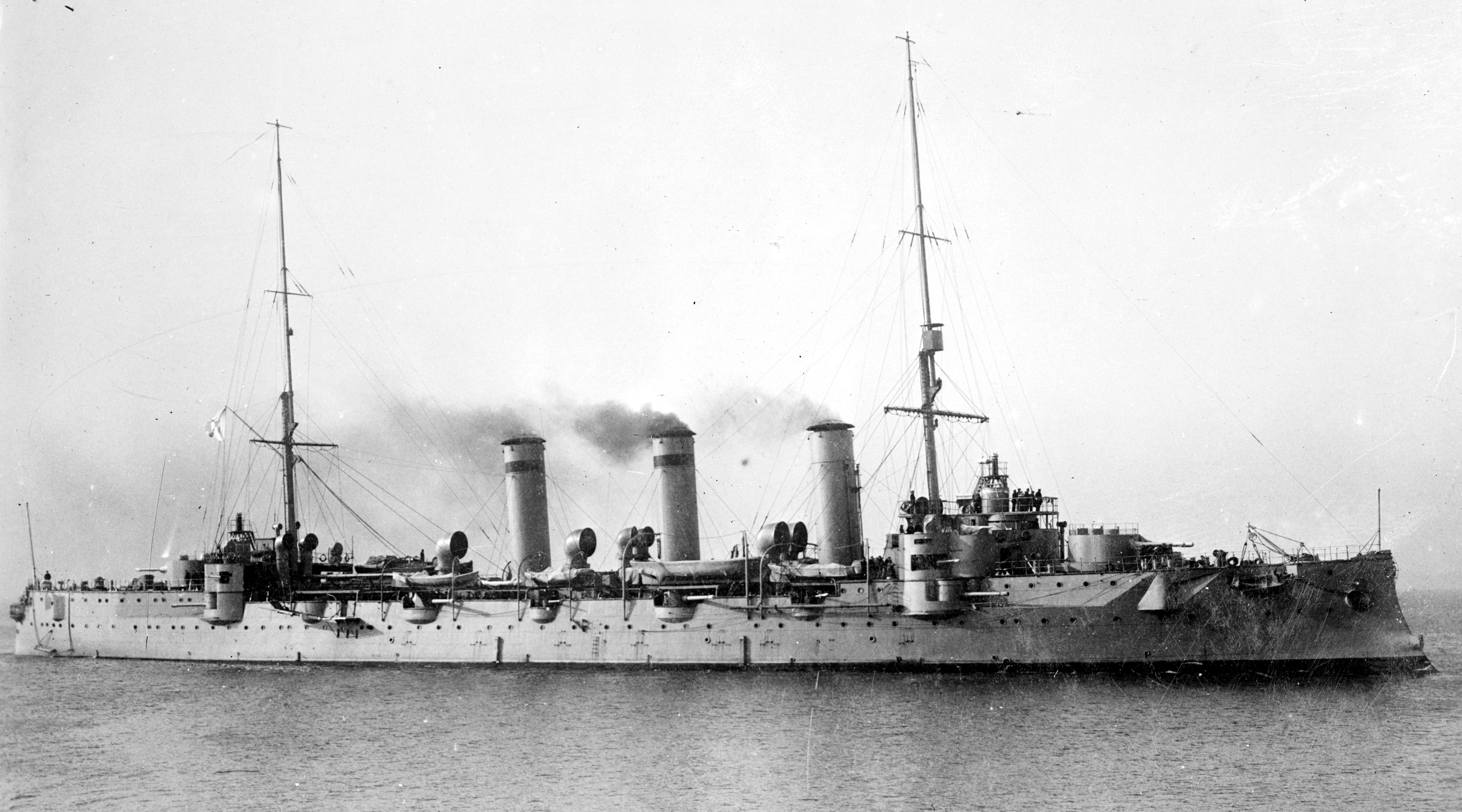
The Russian protected cruiser Oleg was a Bogatyr-class protected cruiser

Protected cruisers, a type of cruiser of the late 19th century, took their name from the armored deck, which protected vital machine-spaces from fragments released by explosive shells. Protected cruisers lacked a belt of armour along the sides, in contrast to armored cruisers which carried both deck and belt armour.[source: wikipedia]

Outside of a handful of very large designs in the major navies (which preceded the revival of armored cruisers), the majority of protected cruisers were of 'second-' or 'third-class' types, lighter in displacement and mounting fewer and/or lighter guns than armored cruisers.

By the early 20th-century, with the advent of increasingly lighter yet stronger armour, even smaller vessels could afford some level of both belt and deck armour. In the place of protected cruisers, these new 'light armored cruisers' evolved into light cruisers and heavy cruisers, the former especially taking on many of the roles originally that had been envisioned for protected cruisers.

== Evolution ==
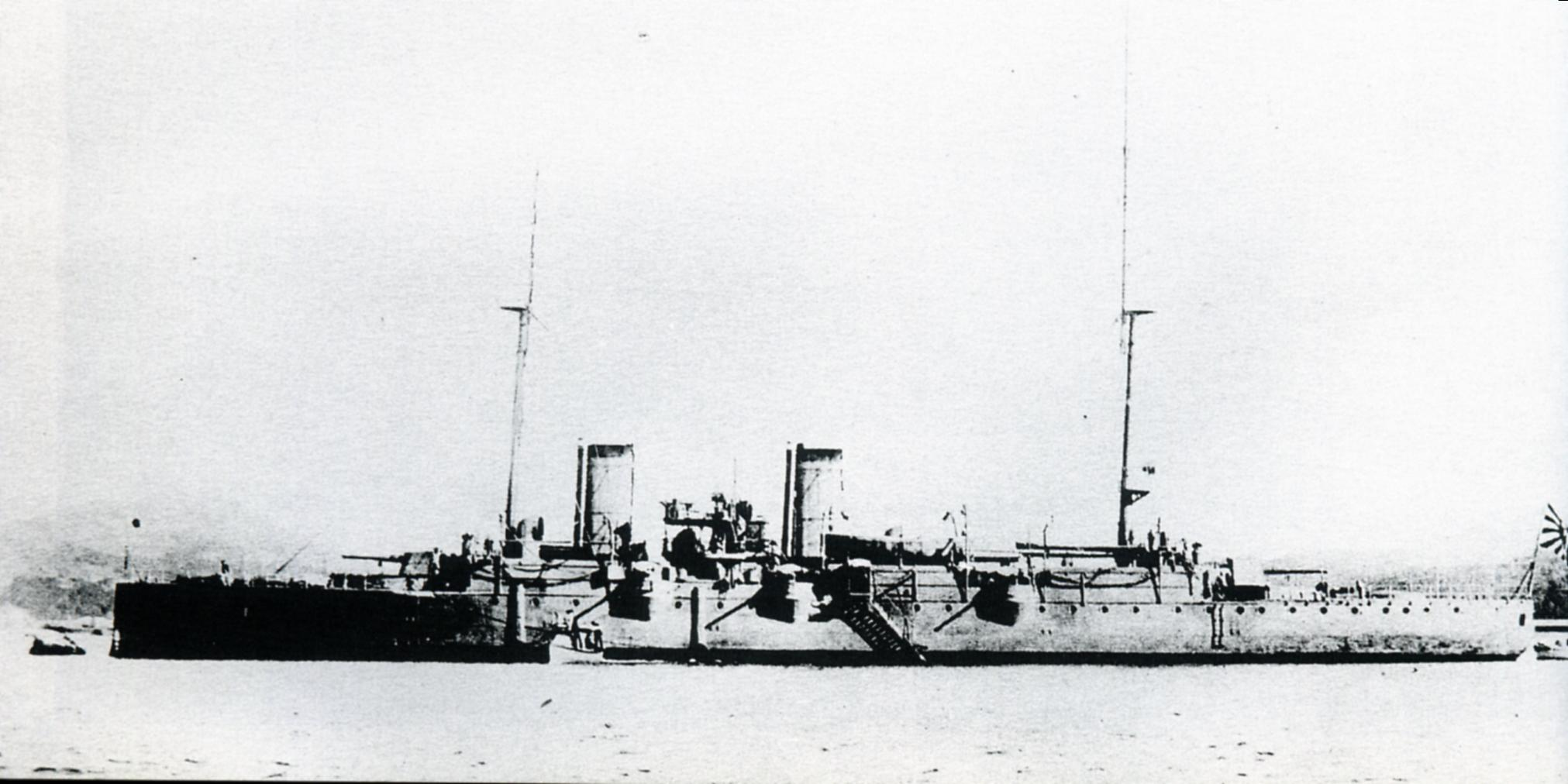
The protected cruiser Esmeralda, built by the shipyard of the Armstrong House for the Chilean Navy, was the first warship of its kind in the world.

From the late 1850s, navies began to replace their fleets of wooden ships-of-the-line with armoured ironclad warships. The frigates and sloops which performed the missions of scouting, commerce raiding and trade protection remained unarmoured. For several decades, it proved difficult to design a ship which had a meaningful amount of effective armour but at the same time maintained the speed and range required of a "cruising warship". The first attempts to do so, large armored cruisers like HMS Shannon, proved unsatisfactory, generally lacking enough speed for their cruiser role. They were, along with their foreign counterparts such as the French Alma class, more like second- or third-class battleships and were mainly intended to fulfil this role on foreign stations where full-scale battleships could not be spared or properly supported.[source : wikipedia]

=== First protective decks ===
During the 1870s the increasing power of armour-piercing shells made armouring the sides of a warship more and more difficult, as very thick, heavy armour plates were required. Even if armour dominated the design of the ship, it was likely that the next generation of shells would be able to pierce such armour. This problem was even more poignant where the design of cruising warships was concerned, with their requirement for long endurance needing much of their displacement to be devoted to consumable supplies – even where very powerful and space-consuming high-speed machinery was not required – leaving very little weight available for armour protection. This meant that effective side belt armour would be almost impossible to provide for smaller ships.

The alternative was to leave the sides of the ship vulnerable, but to armour a deck just below the waterline. Since this deck would be struck only very obliquely by shells, it could be less thick and heavy than belt armour. The ship could be designed so that the engines, boilers and magazines were under the armoured deck, and with hopefully enough reserve buoyancy to keep the ship afloat even in the event of flooding resulting from damage above the protective deck. An armoured deck had actually been used for the first time in HMS Shannon, although she did rely principally on her vertical belt armour for defence: Her protective deck was only a partial one, extending from the forward armoured bulkhead of the citadel to the bow.

=== Early ships ===
The first of the smaller "unarmoured" British cruisers to incorporate an internal steel deck for protection was the Comus class of corvettes started in 1876; this was only a partial-length deck, with amidships over the machinery spaces. The Comus class were really designed for overseas service and were capable of only a 13-knot (24 km/h; 15 mph) speed, not fast enough for fleet duties. The following Satellite and Calypso classes were similar in performance.

A more potent and versatile balance of attributes was struck with the four Leander-class cruisers. Ordered in 1880 as modified Iris-class dispatch vessels and re-rated as second-class cruisers before completion, these ships combined an amidships protective armoured deck with the size, lean form and high performance of HMS Mercury. They also featured a heavy and well-sited armament of modern breech-loading guns. Leander and her three sisters were successful and established a basis for future Royal Navy cruiser development, through the rest of the century and beyond. Their general configuration was scaled up to the big First Class cruisers and down to the torpedo cruisers, while traces of the protected deck scheme can even be recognised in some sloops.

=== Breakthrough ===
By the start of the 1880s, ships were appearing with full-length armoured decks and no side armour, from the Italia class of very fast battleships to the torpedo ram HMS Polyphemus. In the case of the latter, the armoured deck was of sufficient thickness to defend against small-calibre guns capable of tracking such a difficult, fast target. This was very much the philosophy adopted by George Wightwick Rendel in his design of the so-called 'Rendel cruisers' Arturo Prat, Chaoyong and Yangwei. By enlarging the flatiron gunboat concept, increasing engine power and thus speed, Rendel was able to produce a fast small vessel and still have enough tonnage to incorporate a very thin (one-quarter-inch, 6.4 mm thick) partial protective deck over the machinery. Still small and relatively weakly built, these vessels were 'proto-protected cruisers' which served as the inspiration for a significantly larger ship; Esmeralda.

He believed the Esmeralda was the swiftest and most powerfully armed cruiser in the world. Happily ... she had passed into the hands of a nation which is never likely to be at war with England, for he could conceive no more terrible scourge for our commerce than she would be in the hands of an enemy. No cruiser in the British navy was swift enough to catch her or strong enough to take her. We have seen what the Alabama could do ... what might we expect from such an incomparably superior vessel as the Esmeralda[?]

— Summary of remarks by William Armstrong published in Valparaiso's The Record

The first true mastless protected cruiser and the first of the 'Elswick cruisers', the Esmeralda was designed by Rendel and built for the Chilean Navy by the British firm of Armstrong at their Elswick yard. Esmeralda was revolutionary; she had a high speed of 18 knots (33 km/h; 21 mph) (dispensing entirely with sails), an armament of two 10-inch (254 mm) and six 6-inch (152 mm) guns and a full-length protective deck. This was up to 2 inches (51 mm) thick on the slopes, with a cork-filled cofferdam along her sides. It would not defend against fire from heavy guns, but was designed to be adequate to defeat any gun of the day considered capable of hitting so fast a ship.

With her heavy emphasis on speed and firepower, Esmeralda set the tone for competitive cruiser designs into the early 20th century, with 'Elswick cruisers' of a similar design being constructed for Italy, China, Japan, Argentina, Austria and the United States. Cruisers with armoured decks and no side armour – like Esmeralda – became known as "protected cruisers", and rapidly eclipsed the large and slow armoured cruisers during the 1880s and into the 1890s.

The French Navy adopted the protected-cruiser concept wholeheartedly in the 1880s. The Jeune École school of thought, which proposed a navy composed of fast cruisers for commerce raiding and torpedo boats for coastal defence, became particularly influential in France. The first French protected cruiser was Sfax, laid down in 1882, and followed by six classes of protected cruiser – and no armoured cruisers.

=== Side armour abandonment ===
The Royal Navy remained equivocal about which protection scheme to use for cruisers until 1887. The large Imperieuse class, begun in 1881 and finished in 1886, were built as armoured cruisers but were often referred to as protected cruisers due to the limited extent of their side armour – although what armour they had was admittedly very thick. Their primary role, as with the earlier Shannon and Nelsons, was still to function as small battleships on foreign stations, countering enemy stationnaire ironclads rather than chasing down swift commerce-raiding corsairs. While they carried a very thick and heavy armoured belt of great power of resistance that extended over the middle 140 feet (43 m) of the ship's 315-foot (96 m) length, the belt's upper edge was submerged at full load.

Britain built one more class of armoured cruiser with the Orlando class, begun in 1885 and completed in 1889. They were affected by a similar fault to the Imperieuse regarding their belt's submergence. In 1887 an assessment of the Orlando type judged them inferior to the protected cruisers and thereafter the Royal Navy built only protected cruisers, even for very large first-class cruiser designs, not returning to armoured cruisers until the introduction of new lighter and stronger armour technology (as seen in the Cressy class, laid down in 1898).

The sole major naval power to retain a preference for armoured cruisers into the 1890s was Russia. The Imperial Russian Navy laid down four armoured cruisers and one protected cruiser during the late 1880s, all large ships with sails.

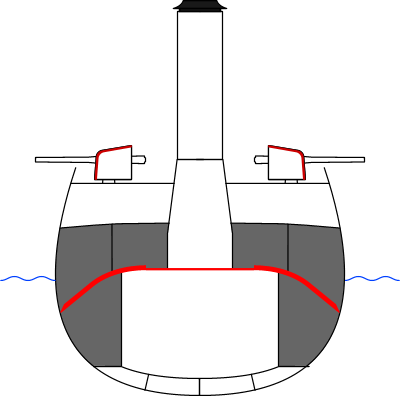
A schematic section of a protected cruiser illustrating the protection scheme. Red lines delineate the armoured deck and gun-shields, and grey areas represent the protective coal-bunkers. Note that the deck is thickest on the slopes, that the upper coal bunker is divided longitudinally to allow the outer layer of coal to be maintained while the inner bunker is emptied, and the watertight double-bottom.

=== Elswick's influence ===
Following the Leander class, the next small cruisers designed for the Royal Navy were the Mersey class of 1883. Derived from the previous class, these were also protected cruisers but with a full-length armoured deck for superior protection. The Merseys were born from a different tactical conception to their forebears and this was reflected in their armament arrangement. They were conceived as 'fleet torpedo cruisers' to carry out attacks on the enemy battle line and featured heavy guns fore and aft with excellent fields of fire. Despite public Admiralty criticism of Elswick designs, it is clear that the Mersey class was heavily influenced by the Italian 'torpedo ram cruiser' Giovanni Bausan, a design itself derived from Esmeralda. Thus, the British notion of the protected cruising warship was being shaped early on by the commercial export models coming out of Elswick. (For the following decade, practically any British cruiser which was seen to have eschewed very heavy firepower in favour of conservative design balance was subject to fierce public criticism, and this period coincided somewhat unfortunately with Sir William White's tenure as DNC.)

The protected cruiser remained a popular and economical type, rather stable in terms of its characteristics, right throughout the 1890s and into the early 1900s. During this period, protected cruiser designs of second- to third-class grew slowly in size, seeing few major changes to the common balance of design features. Perhaps the most significant paradigm shift came with the universal adoption of quick-firing guns by the world's navies in the middle of the 1890s; suddenly small and medium cruisers saw a swift increase in their fighting power for a slight reduction in gun calibre, yielding a very economical balance of attributes. This kept the protected cruiser competitive for a further decade.

== Eclipse of the type ==
By 1910, metallurgical advances had led to lighter and stronger steel armour, and lighter, more powerful steam turbines had displaced reciprocating steam engines in general use. This gave rise to a new class of cruising warship, the "light armoured cruiser", which featured a side armoured belt (topped by a flat armoured deck) amidships and sloped armoured decks at the ends, instead of the single full-length curved deck of the older ships. With the introduction of oil-fired boilers, more effective at generating a constant steam pressure optimal to turbine engines, side bunkers of coal disappeared from ships, and with them their protection, making the shift to side armour a practical choice.

The majority of pre-existing protected cruisers – products of the Victorian-era design generation – had become obsolete: their old and worn engines were degrading their already-eclipsed performance; their older models of lower-velocity guns were inferior in distance to newer equivalent ships in a period where long-range guns and fire control were rapidly-developing; and, most critically, their protection was inferior to the new generation of side-armoured ships. From this point on, practically no more protected cruisers would be built for the world's navies.

== Service areas ==
=== Austria-Hungary ===
The Austro-Hungarian Navy built and operated three classes of protected cruisers. These were two small ships of the Panther class, two ships of the Kaiser Franz Joseph I class and three of the Zenta class.

=== Britain ===
The Royal Navy rated cruisers as first, second and third class between the late 1880s and 1905, and built large numbers of them for trade protection requirements. For most of this time these cruisers were built with a "protected", rather than armoured, scheme of protection for their hulls. First-class protected cruisers were as large and as well-armed as armoured cruisers, and were built as an alternative to the large first-class armoured cruiser from the late 1880s till 1898. Second-class protected cruisers were smaller, displacing 3,000–5,500 long tons (3,000–5,600 t) and were of value both in trade protection duties and scouting for the fleet. Third-class cruisers were smaller, lacked a watertight double bottom, and were intended primarily for trade protection duties, though a few small cruisers were built for fleet scout roles or as "torpedo" cruisers during the "protected" era.

The introduction of Krupp armour in six-inch thickness rendered the "armoured" protection scheme more effective for the largest first class cruisers, and no large first class protected cruisers were built after 1898. The smaller cruisers unable to bear the weight of heavy armoured belts retained the "protected" scheme up to 1905, when the last units of the Challenger and Highflyer classes were completed. There was a general hiatus in British cruiser production after this time, apart from a few classes of small, fast scout cruisers for fleet duties. When the Royal Navy began building larger cruisers (less than 4,000 long tons, 4,100 t) again around 1910, they used a mix of armoured decks and/or armoured belts for protection, depending on class. These modern, turbine-powered cruisers are properly classified as light cruisers.

=== France ===
The French Navy built and operated a large variety of protected cruisers classes starting with Sfax in 1882. The last ship built to this design was Jurien de la Gravière in 1897.

=== Germany ===
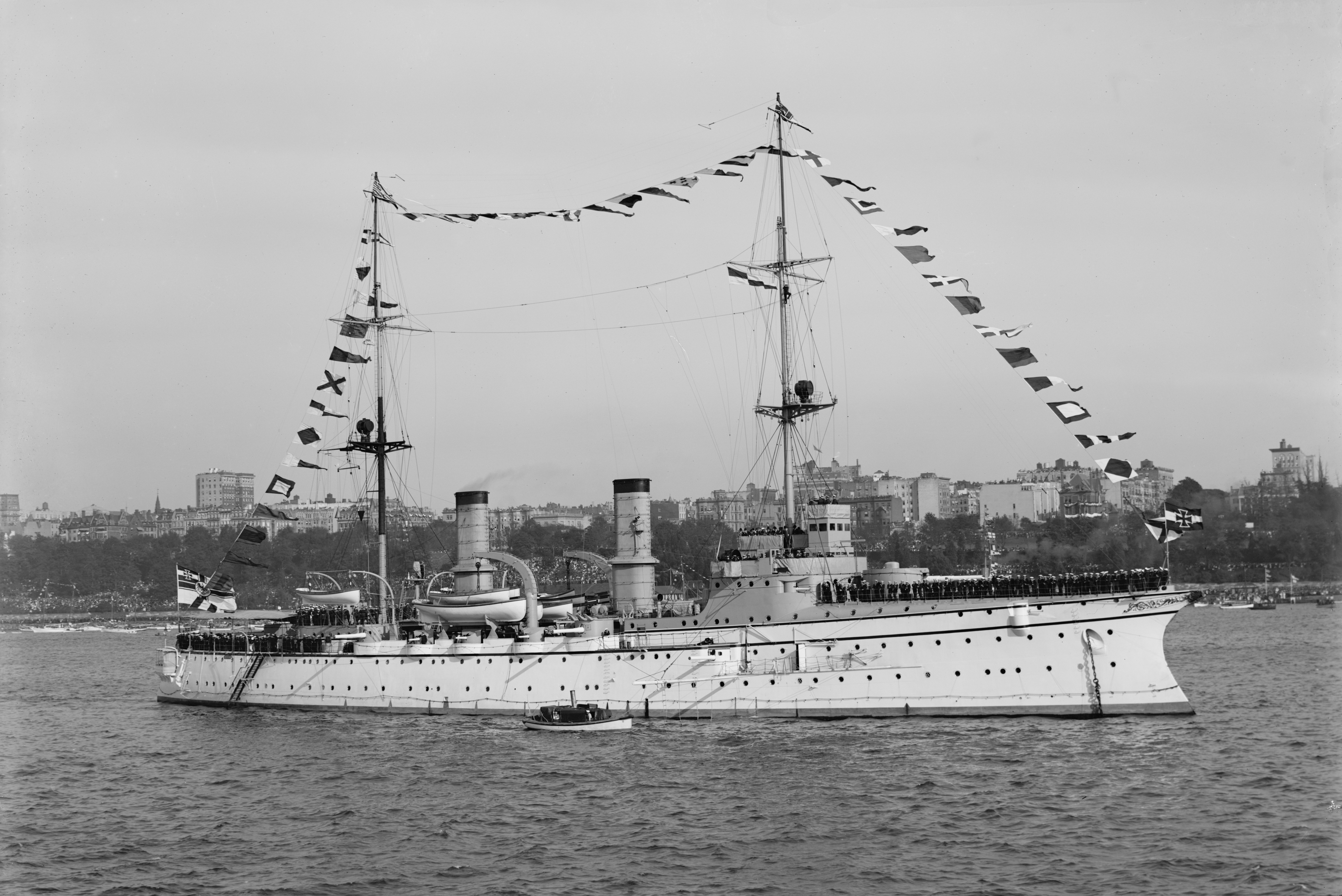
Hertha on a visit to the United States in 1909

The German Imperial Navy (Kaiserliche Marine) built a series of protected cruisers in the 1880s and 1890s, starting with the two ships of the Irene class in the 1880s. The Navy completed only two additional classes of protected cruisers, comprising six more ships: the unique Kaiserin Augusta, and the five Victoria Louise-class ships. The type then was superseded by the armored cruiser at the turn of the century, the first of which being Fürst Bismarck. All of these ships tended to incorporate design elements from their foreign contemporaries, though the Victoria Louise class more closely resembled German battleships of the period, which carried lighter main guns and a greater number of secondary guns.

These ships were employed as fleet scouts and colonial cruisers. Several of the ships served with the German East Asia Squadron, and Hertha, Irene, and Hansa took part in the Battle of Taku Forts in 1900 during the Boxer Rebellion. During a deployment to American waters in 1902, Vineta participated in the Venezuelan crisis of 1902–1903, where she bombarded Fort San Carlos. Long since obsolete by the outbreak of World War I, the five Victoria Louise-class vessels briefly served as training ships in the Baltic but were withdrawn by the end of 1914 for secondary duties. Kaiserin Augusta and the two Irene-class cruisers similarly served in reduced capacities for the duration of the war. All eight ships were broken up for scrap following Germany's defeat.

=== Italy ===
The Italian Regia Marina (Royal Navy) ordered twenty protected cruisers between the 1880s and 1910s. The first five ships, Giovanni Bausan and the Etna class, were built as "battleship destroyers", armed with a pair of large caliber guns. Subsequent cruisers were more traditional designs, and were instead intended for reconnaissance and colonial duties. Some of the ships, like Calabria and the Campania class, were designed specifically for service in Italy's colonial empire, while others, like Quarto and the Nino Bixio class, were designed as high speed fleet scouts.

Most of these ships saw action during the Italo-Turkish War of 1911–1912, where several of them supported Italian troops fighting in Libya, and another group operated in the Red Sea. There, the cruiser Piemonte and two destroyers sank or destroyed seven Ottoman gunboats in the Battle of Kunfuda Bay in January 1912. Most of the earlier cruisers were obsolescent by the outbreak of World War I, and so had either been sold for scrap or reduced to subsidiary roles. The most modern vessels, including Quarto and the Nino Bixio class, saw limited action in the Adriatic Sea after Italy entered the war in 1915. The surviving vessels continued on in service through the 1920s, with some—Quarto, Campania, and Libia, remaining on active duty into the late 1930s.

=== Netherlands ===
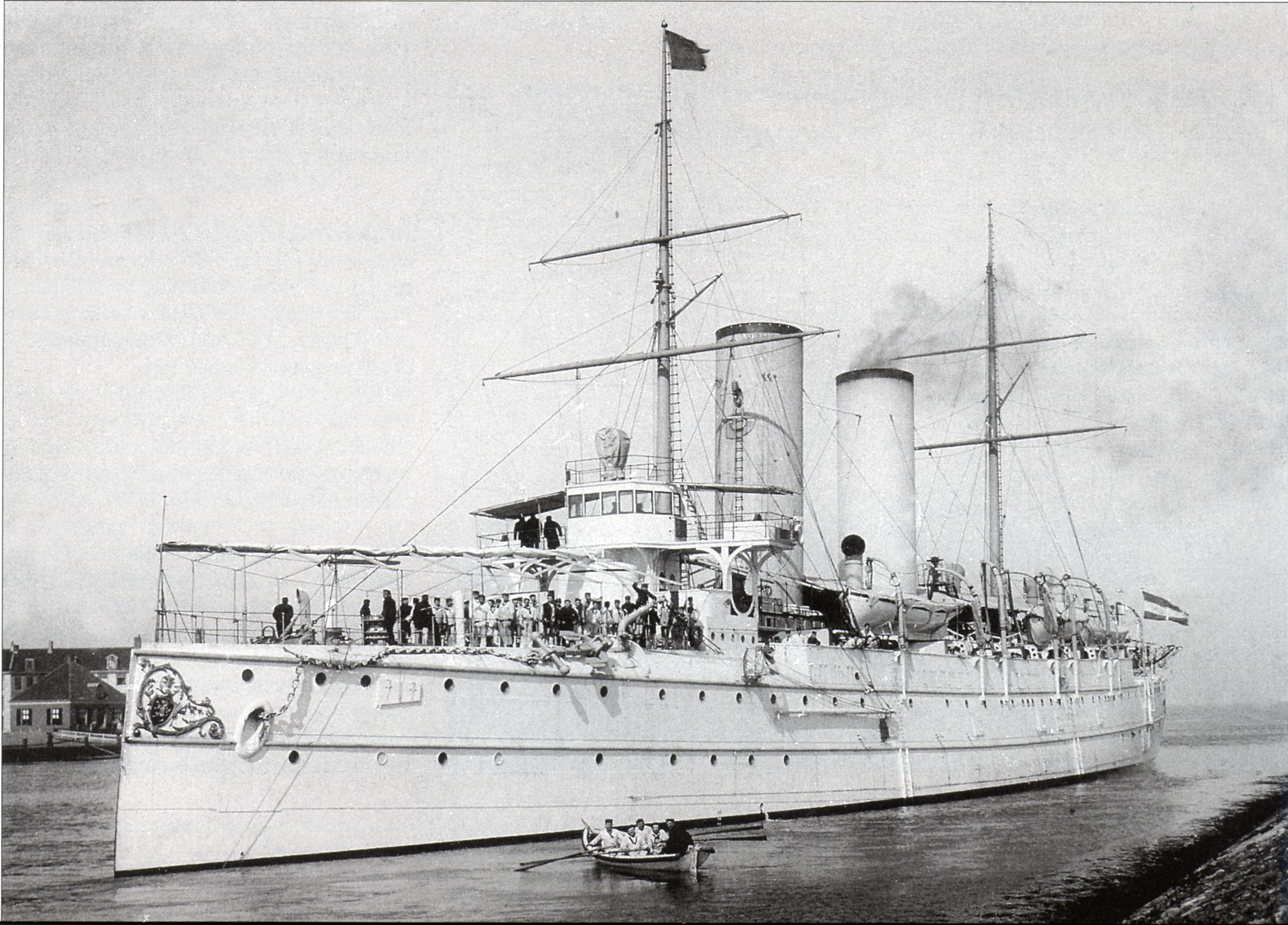
Dutch protected cruiser Noord-Brabant as an accommodation ship

The Royal Netherlands Navy built several protected cruisers between 1880 and 1900. The first protected cruiser was launched in 1890 and called HNLMS Sumatra. It was a small cruiser with a heavy main gun; four years later a larger and more heavily armed protected cruiser was commissioned, which was called HNLMS Koningin Wilhelmina der Nederlanden. In addition to these two cruisers, the Dutch also built six protected cruisers of the Holland class. The Holland-class cruisers were commissioned between 1898 and 1901, and featured, besides other armaments, two 15 cm SK L/40 single naval guns.

The Dutch protected cruisers have played a role in several international events. For example, during the Boxer Rebellion, two protected cruisers (Holland and (Koningin Wilhelmina der Nederlanden) were sent to Shanghai to protect European citizens and defend Dutch interests.

=== Russia ===
The Imperial Russian Navy operated a series of protected cruiser classes (Russian: Бронепалубный крейсер, Armored deck cruiser). The last ships built to this design where the Izumrud class in 1901.

=== Spain ===
The Spanish Navy operated a series of protected cruisers classes starting with Reina Regente class. The last ship built to this design was Reina Regente in 1899.

=== United States ===
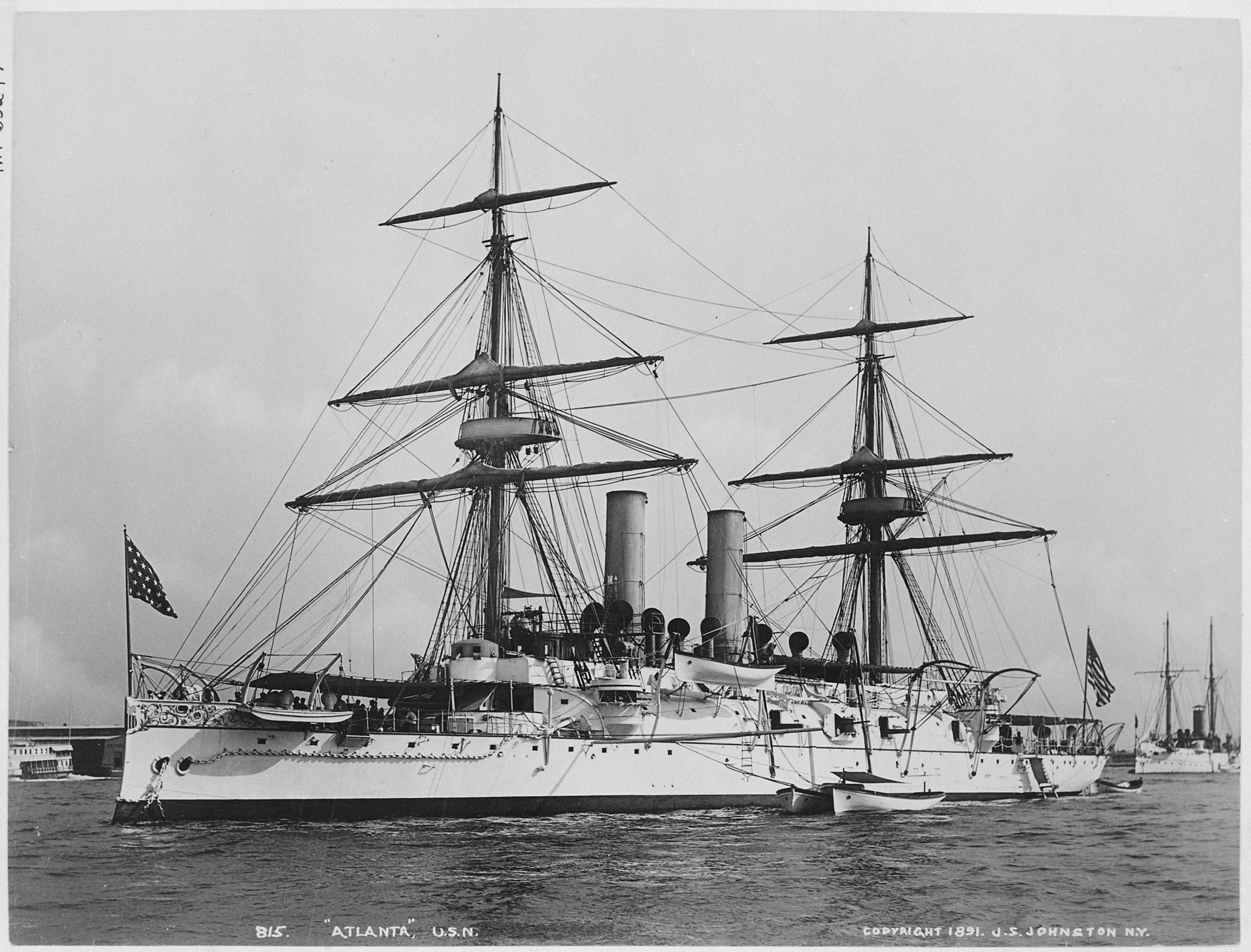
USS Atlanta in 1891

The first protected cruiser of the United States Navy's "New Navy" was USS Atlanta, launched in October 1884, soon followed by USS Boston in December, and USS Chicago a year later. A numbered series of cruisers began with Newark (Cruiser No. 1), although Charleston (Cruiser No. 2) was the first to be launched, in July 1888, and ending with another Charleston, Cruiser No. 22, launched in 1904. The last survivor of this series is USS Olympia, preserved as a museum ship in Philadelphia.

The reclassification of 17 July 1920 put an end to the U.S. usage of the term "protected cruiser", the existing ships were classified as light or heavy cruisers with new numbers, depending on their level of armor.

== Surviving examples ==
A few protected cruisers have survived as museum ships, while others were used as breakwaters, some of which can still be seen today.

- Aurora – St Petersburg, Russia
- USS Olympia – Philadelphia, Pennsylvania
- Chinese cruiser Zhiyuan replica is on display in Dandong, China
- Bow section and bridge of Puglia – La Spezia, Italy
- Bow section of HMS Vindictive is on display at Ostend, Belgium
- The hulk of USS Charleston serves as a breakwater in Kelsey Bay, on the north coast of Vancouver Island.

== See also ==
- Battlecruiser
- Unprotected cruiser
