= 15 cm SK L/40 naval gun =

15 cm SK L/40
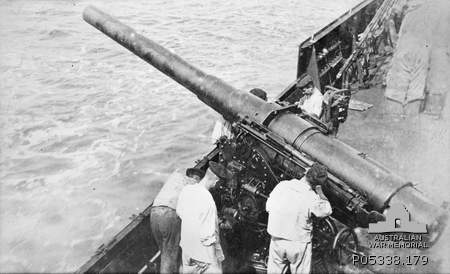
- A 15 cm SK L/40 gun aboard the German auxiliary cruiser SMS Wolf circa. 1916–18
- Type: Naval gun Coast-defence gun
- Place of origin: German Empire

Service history
- In service: 1898—1945
- Used by: German Empire; Austria-Hungary; The Netherlands; Nazi Germany; Portugal
- Wars: World War I World War II

Production history
- Designer: Krupp
- Designed: 1897
- Manufacturer: Krupp
- Variants: No.2, No.3, No.4, No.5; Krupp 15 cm L/40 K94; Škoda 15 cm L/40 K96

Specifications
- Mass: 4,460 kg (9,830 lb)
- Length: 6 m (19 ft 8 in)
- Barrel length: 5.4 m (17 ft 9 in)
- Shell: Separate-loading, cased charge
- Caliber: 149.1 millimeters (5.87 in)
- Breech: horizontal sliding breech block
- Elevation: -7° to +20°
- Traverse: -150° to +150°
- Rate of fire: 4-5 rpm
- Muzzle velocity: 800 m/s (2,600 ft/s)
- Maximum firing range: 13.7 km (8.5 mi) at 20°.

The 15 cm SK L/40 (Note: SK - Schnelladekanone (quick loading cannon); L - Länge in Kaliber (length in caliber)) was a German naval gun that was used as secondary armament on pre-dreadnought battleships, protected cruisers and armored cruisers of the Imperial German Navy in World War I. It was also used as a coast-defence gun during World Wars I and II.

== Construction ==
The 15 cm SK L/40 gun was constructed of A tube, two layers of hoops and used a Krupp horizontal sliding-wedge breech block. It used separate loading metallic cased propellant charges and projectiles. Unlike other large naval guns of the time which used separate loading bagged charges and projectiles, this gun used charges inside of a brass cartridge case to provide obturation. The guns were often mounted in single casemates or single turrets amidships. In addition to guns produced for the Imperial German Navy comparable export models were produced for the Royal Netherlands Navy and produced under license by Škoda for the Austro-Hungarian Navy.

Export Models	No.2	No.3	No.4	No.5	Krupp 15 cm L/40 K94	Škoda 15 cm L/40 K96
Users	Netherlands	Netherlands	Netherlands	Netherlands	Austria-Hungary	Austria-Hungary
Weight	4,420 kg (9,740 lb)	4,850 kg (10,690 lb)	5,200 kg (11,500 lb)	4,880 kg (10,760 lb)	4,500 kg (9,900 lb)	4,500 kg (9,900 lb)
Rifling Length	4.4 m (14 ft 5 in)	4.8 m (15 ft 9 in)	5.5 m (18 ft 1 in)	4.6 m (15 ft 1 in)	4.6 m (15 ft 1 in)	4.6 m (15 ft 1 in)
Muzzle Velocity	680 m/s (2,200 ft/s)	680 m/s (2,200 ft/s)	850 m/s (2,800 ft/s)	745 m/s (2,440 ft/s)	690 m/s (2,300 ft/s)	690 m/s (2,300 ft/s)

== Naval Use ==
Ship classes that carried the 15 cm SK L/40 include:

- German:
  - Kaiser Friedrich III-class battleship
  - Prinz Adalbert-class cruiser
  - Roon-class cruiser
  - Scharnhorst-class cruiser
  - Victoria Louise-class cruiser
  - Wittelsbach-class battleship
  - SMS Kaiserin Augusta
  - SMS Greif
  - SMS Möwe
  - SMS Wolf
  - Deutschland
- Austrian:
  - Habsburg-class battleship
  - Monarch-class coastal defense ship
  - SMS Kaiser Karl VI
  - SMS Sankt Georg
- Dutch:
  - Holland-class cruiser No. 2 and No. 3
  - Koningin Regentes-class coastal defense ship No. 4
  - HNLMS Marten Harpertszoon Tromp No. 5
  - HNLMS Jacob van Heemskerck No. 5
  - HNLMS De Zeven Provinciën No. 5
- Ottoman:
  - Avnillah-class ironclad
  - Asar-i Tevfik
  - Feth-i Bülend
- China:
  - Haiyung class protected cruiser

== Ammunition ==
Ammunition was of separate loading quick fire type. The projectiles were 39–46.5 cm (1–2 ft) long with a cartridge case and bagged charge which weighed 10 kg (22 lb).

The gun was able to fire:

- Armor Piercing 51 kg (112 lb)
- High Explosive Base Fuzed 45 kg (99 lb)
- High Explosive Nose Fuzed 45 kg (99 lb)
- Common Shell Nose Fuzed 45 kg (99 lb) (Note: World War I Ammunition)

== See also ==
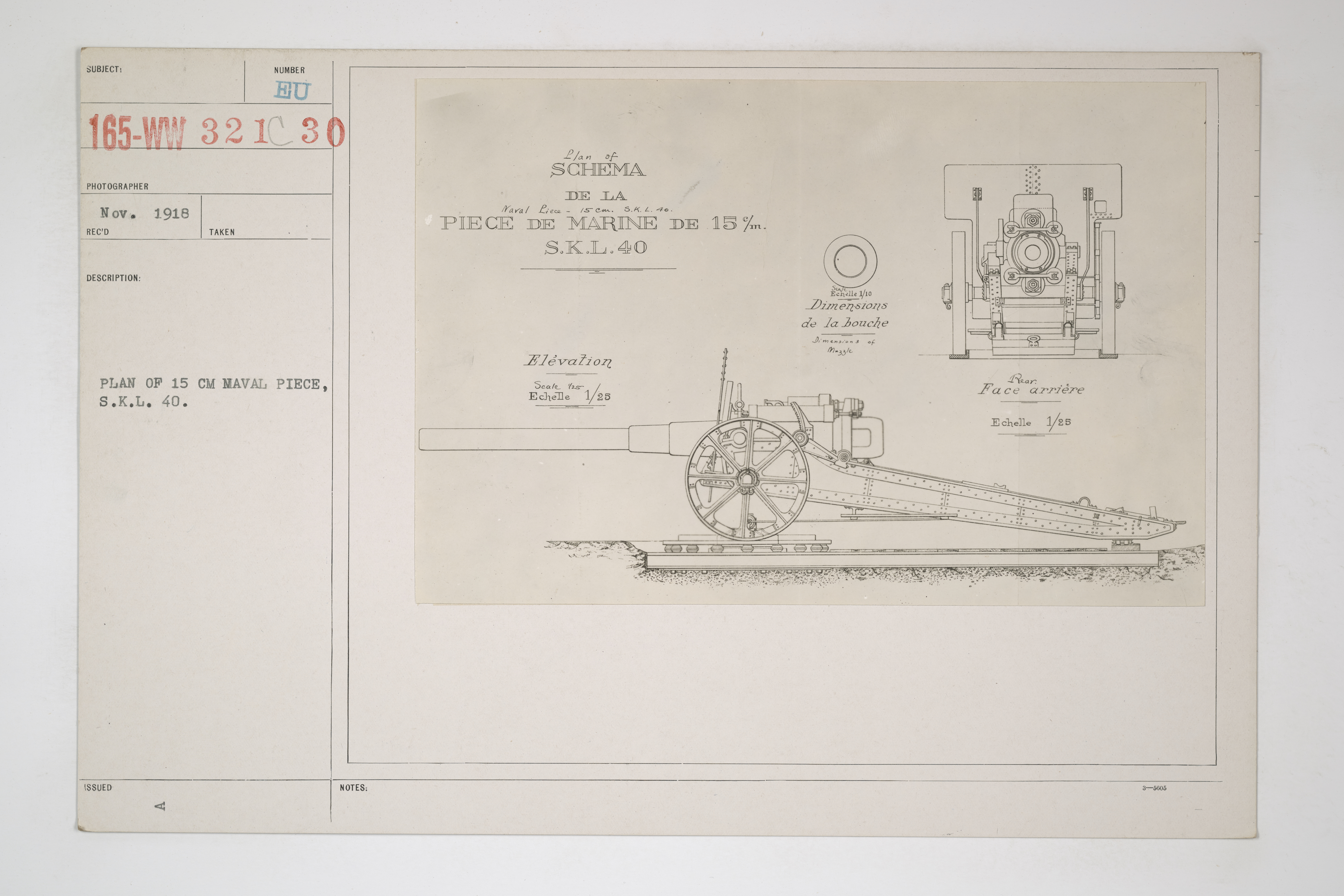
Gun plan for a field mounting

- List of naval guns
- Battery Lothringen
- 15 cm L/40 Feldkanone i.R.
- 15 cm K (E)
- QF 6 inch /40 naval gun British equivalent, firing slightly heavier shell
- 6"/40 caliber gun US equivalent, firing slightly heavier shell
