= SMS Kaiser Franz Joseph I =

Austro-Hungarian Navy's Kaiser Franz Joseph I-class cruiser

- Kaiser Franz Joseph I at anchor

History

Austria-Hungary
- Name: Kaiser Franz Joseph I
- Namesake: Emperor Franz Joseph I of Austria-Hungary
- Ordered: 1887
- Cost: 5,146,884 Krone
- Laid down: 3 January 1888
- Launched: 18 May 1889
- Commissioned: 2 July 1890
- Decommissioned: 1918
- In service: 1890–1918
- Out of service: 1918
- Home port: Cattaro
- Fate: Transferred to State of Slovenes, Croats and Serbs on 31 October 1918

State of Slovenes, Croats and Serbs
- Name: Kaiser Franz Joseph I
- Acquired: 31 October 1918
- Fate: Seized by the Allied powers on 9 November, formally handed over on 10 November 1918

France
- Name: Kaiser Franz Joseph I
- Acquired: 9 November 1918
- Fate: Sank during a gale off Kumbor on 17 October 1919

General characteristics (as built)
- Class & type: Kaiser Franz Joseph I-class cruiser
- Displacement: 3,967 t (3,904 long tons; 4,373 short tons) (designed); 4,494 t (4,423 long tons; 4,954 short tons) (full load)
- Length: 103.7–103.9 m (340 ft 3 in – 340 ft 11 in) o/a; 97.9 m (321 ft 2 in) p/p
- Beam: 14.75–14.8 m (48 ft 5 in – 48 ft 7 in) (Note: Greger describes the beam of the Kaiser Franz Joseph I class as measuring 14.75 meters (48 ft 5 in). Gardiner states the beam for the ships was 14.8 meters (48 ft 7 in). (Greger 1976, p. 27) (Gardiner 1979, p. 278))
- Draught: 5.7 m (18 ft 8 in)
- Propulsion: 2 shafts; 4 × cylindrical double-ended boilers; 2 × horizontal triple expansion engines; 8,000–8,450 shp (5,970–6,300 kW) (Note: Greger lists the propulsion of the Kaiser Franz Joseph I class was 8,000 shaft horsepower (6,000 kW). Gardiner gives a figure of 8,000–8,450 shaft horsepower (5,970–6,300 kW). (Greger 1976, p. 27) (Greger 1976, p. 29))
- Speed: 19.65–20.00 knots (36.39–37.04 km/h; 22.61–23.02 mph)
- Range: 3,200 nautical miles (5,900 km; 3,700 mi) at 10 kn (19 km/h; 12 mph)
- Complement: 367 or 427–444 (Note: Greger claims that Kaiser Franz Joseph I had 444 officers and men, while Kaiserin Elisabeth had 427. Gardiner states the complement of both ships was 367 officers and men. (Greger 1976, p. 29) (Greger 1976, p. 29))
- Armament: 2 × 24 cm (9.4 in) K L/35 guns; 6 × 15 cm (5.9 in) SK L/35 guns; 16 × 47 mm (1.9 in) SFK L/44 guns; 4 × 40–45 cm (16–18 in) torpedo tubes (1 bow, 1 stern, 2 beam) (Note: Greger states that the Kaiser Franz Joseph I class had 40 cm (16 in) torpedo tubes, while Gardiner writes that the torpedo tubes on both ships measured 45 cm (18 in). (Greger 1976, p. 29) (Greger 1976, p. 29))
- Armor: Deck: 38 mm (1.5 in); Hull: 57 mm (2.2 in); Turrets: 90 mm (3.5 in); Conning tower: 50–90 mm (2.0–3.5 in)

General characteristics (after modernization)
- Armament: 2 × 15 cm (5.9 in) SK L/40 guns; 6 × 15 cm (5.9 in) SK L/35 guns; 16 × 47 mm (1.9 in) SFK L/44 guns; 4 × 40–45 cm (16–18 in) torpedo tubes (1 bow, 1 stern, 2 beam)

SMS Kaiser Franz Joseph I (Note: "SMS" stands for "Seiner Majestät Schiff ", or "His Majesty's Ship" in German.) (sometimes called the Kaiser Franz Josef I) was a protected cruiser built for the Austro-Hungarian Navy. Named for the Austrian emperor and Hungarian king Franz Joseph I, Kaiser Franz Joseph I was the lead ship of her namesake class. Constructed by Stabilimento Tecnico Triestino in Trieste, she was laid down in January 1888 and launched in May 1889. Kaiser Franz Joseph I was commissioned into the Navy in June 1890. As the first protected cruiser constructed by the Austro-Hungarian Navy, she was intended to serve as Austria-Hungary's response to the Italian cruisers Giovanni Bausan and Etna. Her design was heavily influenced by the Jeune École (Young School), a naval strategy which had gained prominence in the 1880s as a means to combat a larger and more heavily armored navy of battleships through the use of torpedo flotillas.

Changes in technology and strategic thinking through the adoption of Alfred Thayer Mahan's "decisive battle" doctrine which stressed the construction of powerful battleships as the primary capital ship of navies around the world rendered the design of the Kaiser Franz Joseph I obsolete shortly after her commissioning. Nevertheless, she and her sister ship Kaiserin Elisabeth remained an important component of Austro-Hungarian naval policy, which continued to emphasize coastal defense and overseas missions to show the flag around the world. During the course of her career, Kaiser Franz Joseph I participated in several overseas voyages, including several tours of duty to defend Austro-Hungarian interests in China following the Boxer Rebellion.

At the outbreak of World War I in 1914, Kaiser Franz Joseph I was assigned to the Fifth Battle Division and stationed at the Austro-Hungarian naval base at Cattaro. Due to her age and obsolete design, Kaiser Franz Joseph I saw little action during most of the conflict, though she did participate in shelling Franco-Montenegrin artillery batteries located on the slopes of Mount Lovćen in late 1914, which overshadowed the Bocche di Cattaro. In January 1916, when the Austria-Hungary began an invasion of Montenegro, Kaiser Franz Joseph I assisted in again silencing Montenegrin batteries on Mount Lovćen in support of the Austro-Hungarian Army, which seized the mountain and subsequently captured the Montenegrin capital of Cetinje, knocking the country out of the war.

In 1917, Kaiser Franz Joseph I was decommissioned, disarmed, and converted into a headquarters ship for the Austro-Hungarian base at Cattaro. She remained in this capacity through the rest of the war. When Austria-Hungary was facing defeat in October 1918, the Austrian government transferred its navy to the newly formed State of Slovenes, Croats and Serbs in order to avoid having to hand the ship over to the Allies. Following the Armistice of Villa Giusti in November 1918, an Allied fleet sailed into Cattaro and seized the former Austro-Hungarian ships stationed in the Bocche, including Kaiser Franz Joseph I. She was ceded to France as a war reparation after the war, but sank during a gale off Kumbor in October 1919. Her wreck was twice salvaged in 1922 and 1967. Two of her cannons are in Cetinje, Montenegro.

== Background ==
On 13 November 1883, Emperor Franz Joseph I promoted Maximilian Daublebsky von Sterneck to the office of vice admiral, and named him Marinekommandant of the Austro-Hungarian Navy as well as Chief of the Naval Section of the War Ministry (German: Chef der Marinesektion). Sterneck's presence at the Battle of Lissa, and his past ties to Admiral Wilhelm von Tegetthoff, led to his promotion being widely supported within the Navy. After spending his first years as Marinekommandant reforming the administrative bureaucracy of the Navy, Sterneck began to pursue a new program of warship construction in the late 1880s and early 1890s.

=== Emergence of Jeune École ===
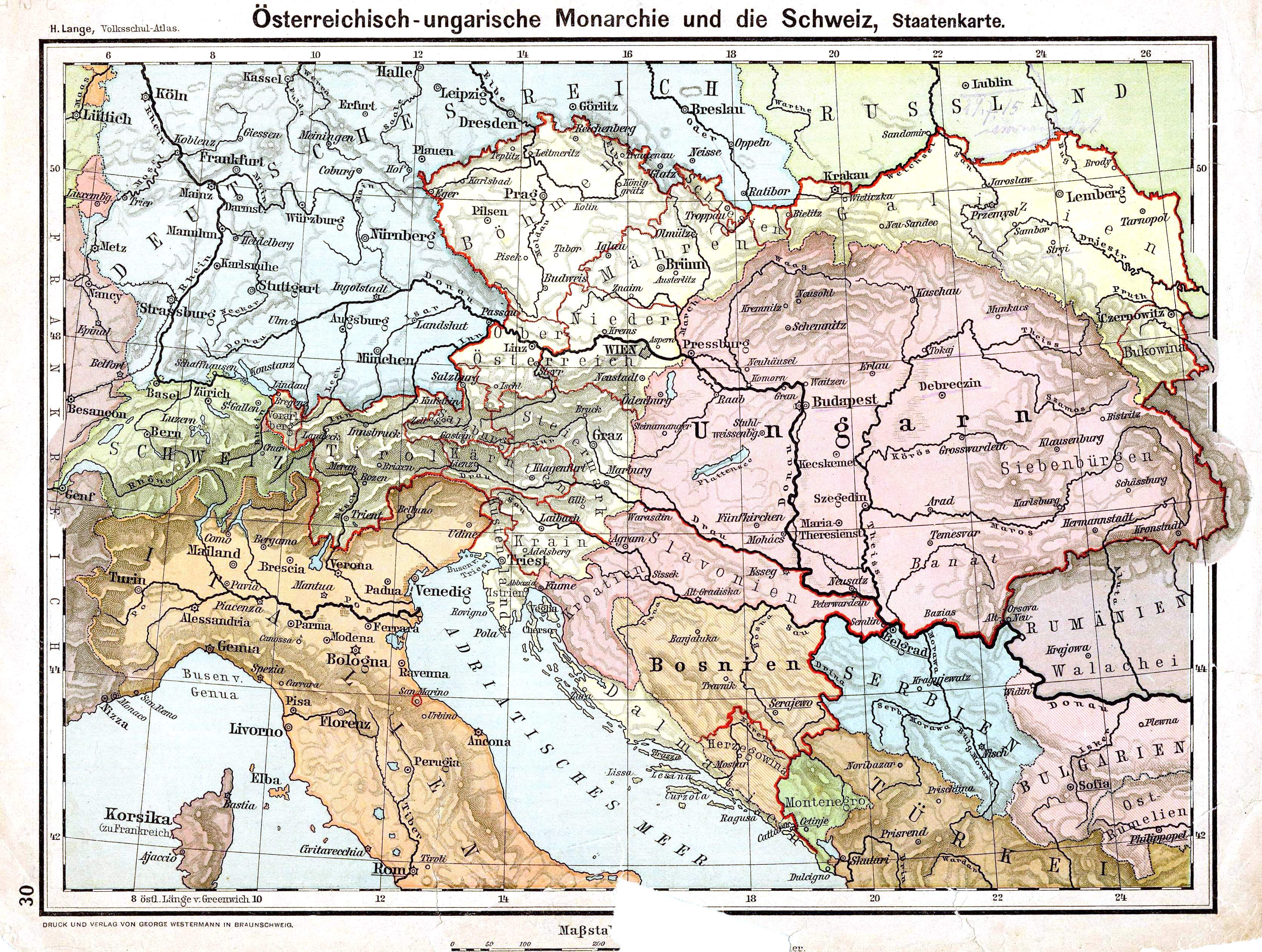
A map of Austria-Hungary and the Adriatic Sea in 1899

In the 1880s, the naval philosophy of Jeune École began to gain prominence among smaller navies throughout Europe, particularly within the French Navy, where it was first developed by naval theorists wishing to counter the strength of the British Royal Navy. Jeune École advocated the use of a powerful armed fleet primarily made up of cruisers, destroyers, and torpedo boats to combat a larger fleet made up of ironclads and battleships, as well as disrupt the enemy's global trade. Jeune École was quickly adopted as the main naval strategy for Austria-Hungary under the leadership of Sterneck. His strong support for Jeune École was rooted in a belief that the strategy appeared to fit existing Austro-Hungarian naval policy, which stressed coastal defense and limited power projection beyond the Adriatic Sea. Tests conducted by the Austro-Hungarian Navy during the early and mid 1880s led Sterneck to believe that torpedo boat attacks against a fleet of battleships, a central component of Jeune École, would have to be supported by larger ships such as cruisers. As Austria-Hungary lacked the ability to disrupt global trade due to its location in the Adriatic Sea, and the two potential enemies the Navy could find itself at war with–Italy and Russia–lacked suitable targets for commerce raiding or overseas colonies, the cruisers which would be designed under the principles of Jeune École would instead focus on coastal defense and leading torpedo boat flotillas as opposed to commerce raiding. These tests, as well as the adoption of Jeune École as the principal naval strategy of the Austro-Hungarian Navy, led to the development of Kaiser Franz Joseph I.

=== Proposals and budget ===
Under the Navy's 1881 plan which was passed by his predecessor, Friedrich von Pöck, Sterneck proposed the construction of a class of cruisers to the Austrian and Hungarian Delegations for Common Affairs as "replacements" for the Austro-Hungarian ironclads Lissa and Kaiser. (Note: For political and traditional purposes, the Marinekommandant designated all of his proposed ships to the Austrian and Hungarian parliaments with the prefix "Ersatz" ("replacement"). Once a ship was launched, it would be formally named. The Kaiser Franz Joseph I-class cruisers were thus designated as replacement ships for the ironclads Lissa and Kaiser. While funding for the third ship was approved under the 1890 budget, authorization to construct it was never given and the vessel was never laid down. The ship was simply referred to as "Rammkreuzer C".) Kaiser had not seen active service since 1875 and Pöck had intended to have her replaced prior to his resignation in 1883. Lissa had been reassigned to the II Reserve by 1888. The Delegations strongly supported the proposal for the cruisers, in large part due to their relatively low price compared to other capital ships of the era. Two cruisers built to the specifications of Kaiser Franz Joseph I would cost 5,360,000 florins, while the ironclad warship Kronprinz Erzherzog Rudolf, laid down in 1884, had cost ƒ5,440,000 to construct. The Delegations thus allocated funding to construct two Kaiser Franz Joseph I-class ships—"Ram Cruiser A" and "Ram Cruiser B" (German: "Rammkreuzer A" and "Rammkreuzer B")—under the 1888 and 1889 budgets. "Ram Cruiser A" would eventually become Kaiser Franz Joseph I. (Note: In 1892, Austria-Hungary switched its currency from florins to crowns with an exchange rate of 1 florin to 2 crowns. (Reform of the Currency in Austria-Hungary, p. 336)) This means that Kaiser Franz Joseph I's construction costs were later recorded as being 5,146,884 Krone.

== Design ==
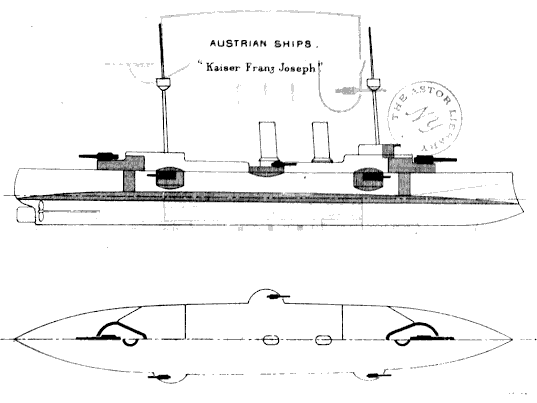
A line drawing of the Kaiser Franz Joseph I-class cruisers

Authorized near the start of Austria-Hungary's second naval arms race against Italy, Sterneck had intended Kaiser Franz Joseph I and her sister ship to serve as Austria-Hungary's response to the Italian cruisers Giovanni Bausan and Etna. Intended as a counter to the growing strength of the Italian Regia Marina, Kaiser Franz Joseph I was designed to lead a torpedo flotilla into battle against a larger fleet of battleships. While Italy and Austria-Hungary had become allies under the 1882 Triple Alliance, Italy's Regia Marina remained the most-important naval power in the region which Austria-Hungary measured itself against, often unfavorably. Despite the Austrian victory at sea after the Battle of Lissa during the Third War of Italian Independence, Italy still possessed a larger navy than Austria-Hungary in the years following the war. The disparity between the Austro-Hungarian and Italian navies had existed ever since the Austro-Italian ironclad arms race of the 1860s. While Austria-Hungary had shrunk the disparity in naval strength throughout the 1870s, Italy boasted the third-largest fleet in the world by the late 1880s, behind the French Navy and the British Royal Navy.

Sterneck hailed the Kaiser Franz Joseph I and her sister ship as the "battleships of the future", and it was envisioned that she would lead a torpedo division made up of one light cruiser, one destroyer, and six torpedo boats. The displacement and speed of Kaiser Franz Joseph I also illustrated Austria-Hungary's application of Jeune École, while her prominent ram bow reflected the legacy of the Battle of Lissa, which saw a much smaller Austrian fleet defeat the Italian Regia Marina using ramming tactics. Sterneck envisioned a hypothetical engagement with the Italian Regia Marina devolving into a chaotic melee similar to the Battle of Lissa, with Kaiser Franz Joseph I and her sister ship leading torpedo divisions against their opponents. Her bow ram would maximize damage in an engagement of this sort and allow her to sink enemy vessels in a similar fashion to Tegetthoff at Lissa. Her two large guns were also chosen in order to give credence to Sterneck's plan for Kaiser Franz Joseph I to help replace heavily armored ironclads and battleships as the primary capital ship of the Austro-Hungarian Navy.

=== General characteristics ===
Designed by Chief Engineer Franz Freiherr Jüptner, Kaiser Franz Joseph I had an overall length of 103.7–103.9 meters (340 ft 3 in – 340 ft 11 in) and a length between perpendiculars of 97.9 meters (321 ft 2 in). She had a beam of 14.75–14.8 meters (48 ft 5 in – 48 ft 7 in), and a mean draft of 5.7 meters (18 ft 8 in) at deep load. She was designed to displace 3,967 metric tons (3,904 long tons; 4,373 short tons) at normal load, but at full combat load she displaced 4,494 metric tons (4,423 long tons; 4,954 short tons). She was manned by a crew of 367 to 444 officers and men.

=== Propulsion ===
Her propulsion systems consisted of two shafts which operated two screw propellers measuring 4.35 meters (14 ft 3 in) in diameter. These propellers were powered by two sets of horizontal triple expansion engines, designed to provide 8,000–8,450 shaft horsepower (5,970–6,300 kW). These engines were powered by four cylindrical double-ended boilers, which gave Kaiser Franz Joseph I a top speed of 19.65 knots (36.39 km/h; 22.61 mph) while conducting sea trials. In order to power her boilers, Kaiser Franz Joseph I carried 670 metric tons (660 long tons; 740 short tons) of coal. This gave her a range of approximately 3,200 nautical miles (5,900 km; 3,700 mi) at 10 knots (19 km/h; 12 mph).

=== Armament ===
Kaiser Franz Joseph I had an armament system which was based heavily off of the design of "Elswick cruisers" such as the Chilean cruiser Esmeralda. She was armed with a main battery of two 24 cm (9.4 in) K L/35 Krupp guns, mounted in turrets fore and aft. Her secondary armament consisted of six 15 cm (5.9 in) SK L/35 guns, mounted in casemates amidships with three on either side. She also possessed 16 47 mm (1.9 in) SFK L/44 guns, and four 40–45 cm (16–18 in) torpedo tubes with two located at the bow and stern, and two located amidships. These heavy guns were intended to help the cruiser open fire on heavier battleships from a distance while supporting torpedo boat attacks on an enemy warship or fleet. In 1905, Kaiser Franz Joseph I underwent a refit for modernization. During this refit, her main battery was replaced by two 15 cm (5.9 in) SK L/40 Škoda guns.

The mountings her main guns were located on consisted of a rotating platform and a domed gun turret. These turrets were operated by a series of steam pumps below the deck of both ships. While each turret had its own steam pump, pipes ran the length of the ship to connect each steam pump and their accompanying turret together in order to provide a backup system should one of the steam pumps be disabled in combat. The maximum elevation of the two main guns, as well as their loading angle, was 13.5°. When at this angle, the range of the main guns' 215 kilograms (474 lb) shells was 10,000 meters (11,000 yd). The maximum elevation of the ships' secondary armament was 16°, and their 21 kilograms (46 lb) shells had the same range as the main battery.

=== Armor ===
Kaiser Franz Joseph I was protected at the waterline with an armored belt measuring 57 mm (2.2 in) thick. The turrets had 90 mm (3.5 in) thick armor, while the thickness of the deck armor was 38 mm (1.5 in). Her conning tower was protected by 50–90 mm (2.0–3.5 in) armor. The machinery for Kaiser Franz Joseph I was assembled by Stabilimento Tecnico Triestino, and she was constructed with a double-bottom hull and designed with over 100 watertight compartments. The steam-powered pumps used to control flooding aboard Kaiser Franz Joseph I could discharge 1,200 metric tons (1,200 long tons; 1,300 short tons) of water per hour.

The defensive systems Kaiser Franz Joseph I- also consisted of coal bunkers located abreast the boiler rooms, and a horizontal cofferdam located at her waterline, which was filled with cellulose fiber. The fiber was intended to seal up any holes in the ship from artillery rounds by swelling up upon contact with seawater, while the impacting shell itself would be slowed down by the surrounding coal, which would also serve to contain any explosions.

== Service history ==
Kaiser Franz Joseph I was laid down by Stabilimento Tecnico Triestino at Trieste under the designation "Ram Cruiser A" on 3 January 1888. "Ram Cruiser A" was formally named Kaiser Franz Joseph I when she was launched at Trieste on 18 May 1889. After conducting sea trials, Kaiser Franz Joseph I was commissioned into the Austro-Hungarian Navy on 2 July 1890.

=== Pre-war ===
Changes in both technology as well as naval doctrine rendered Kaiser Franz Joseph I obsolete shortly after her commissioning. Indeed, the rapid decline of Jeune Ecole during the 1890s and 1900s soon rendered the concept of "ram cruisers" obsolete as a whole. The thin armor, slow speed, and slow-firing guns present on ships such as Kaiser Franz Joseph I led to Sterneck's "battleships of the future" being labeled as "tin cans" and "Sterneck's sardine–boxes" by Austro-Hungarian sailors and naval officers. The poor reception Kaiser Franz Joseph I and her sister ship received due to these changes in technological development and strategic thinking thus contributed to the Austro-Hungarian Navy's decision to transition away from cruisers to battleships as the primary capital ship of the Navy. Within ten years of the launching of Kaiser Franz Joseph I, the first Habsburg-class battleships were laid down.

Despite these shortcomings, Kaiser Franz Joseph I would have a career spanning nearly 30 years. In the summer of 1890, German Kaiser Wilhelm II invited Sterneck to participate in naval exercises in the Baltic Sea. Kaiser Franz Joseph I was dispatched along with Kronprinz Erzherzog Rudolf and Kronprinzessin Erzherzogin Stephanie to represent the Austro-Hungarian Navy. While under the command of Rear Admiral Johann von Hinke, she visited Gibraltar and Cowes in the United Kingdom, where Queen Victoria reviewed the Austro-Hungarian fleet. The cruiser also made port in Copenhagen, Denmark, and Karlskrona, Sweden, before joining the German Imperial Navy in the Baltic for its summer exercises. Following these maneuvers, Kaiser Franz Joseph I made port in France, Portugal, Spain, Italy, and British Malta before returning to Austria-Hungary.

==== 1895–1914 ====
Throughout the 1890s, Kaiser Franz Joseph I participated in several diplomatic voyages on behalf of Austria-Hungary round the world. In 1895, Kaiser Franz Joseph I and her sister ship participated in the opening ceremony of the Kiel Canal. Two years later, she completed her first voyage to the Far East, and returned in late 1897 to participate in an international demonstration off the coast of Crete. The following year, she participated in celebrations honoring Vasco de Gama in Lisbon, Portugal.

Following the end of the Boxer Rebellion, Austria-Hungary was granted a concession in Tianjin in December 1902 as part of its contributions to the Eight-Nation Alliance. It was decided after the rebellion that the Austro-Hungarian Navy would maintain a permanent presence in the Far East to guard Austro-Hungarian interests in China, as well as provide protection for the Austro-Hungarian concession in Tianjin. Kaiserin Elisabeth would be the first Austro-Hungarian ship stationed in China following the end of the Boxer Rebellion, while Kaiser Franz Joseph I conducted training exercises in the Mediterranean Sea throughout 1903 and 1904. While stationed in Austria-Hungary for training purposes, Kaiser Franz Joseph I underwent a refit in 1905 in order to have her Krupp guns replaced with 15-centimeter (5.9 in) Škoda guns. These guns were considered more modern than their predecessors, and had a faster loading time. Other changes included moving the location of the secondary guns to the upper deck, where they would be less exposed to the elements and have a better vantage points compared to their previous location in casemates located close to the waterline of both ships. Later that same year, she sailed for China to relieve Kaiserin Elisabeth, who underwent the same modernization upon her return to Austria-Hungary in 1906.

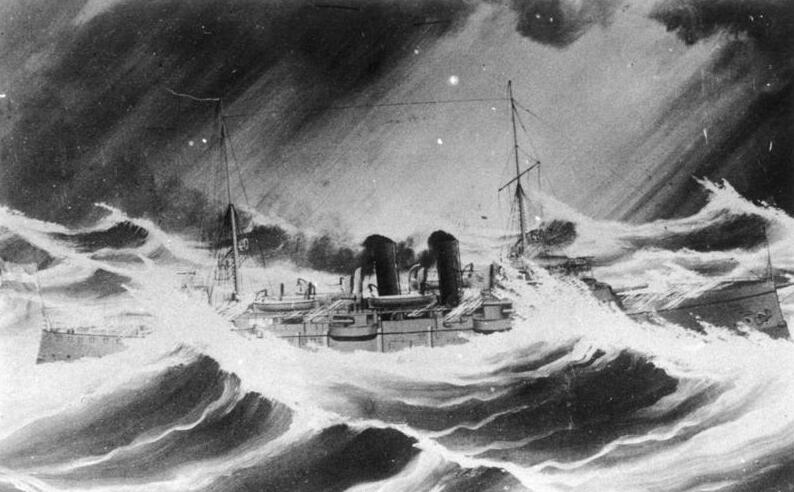
Kaiser Franz Joseph I during a storm off the coast of China

Kaiser Franz Joseph would remain stationed in China until 1908. That same year, she and her sister ship were re-classified as 2nd class cruisers and rotated duties once more, with the Kaiser Franz Joseph I being sent back to China and Kaiserin Elisabeth being transferred to Austria-Hungary to serve as a training vessel. In 1911, Kaiser Franz Joseph I and her sister ship were again re-designated, this time as small cruisers. That same year, Kaiserin Elisabeth returned to Austria-Hungary for the last time, while Kaiser Franz Joseph began her final deployment to China. During this period, Kaiser Franz Joseph's crew were deployed to protect Shanghai and Austro-Hungarian interests in China during the Xinhai Revolution. In 1913, the cruisers were ordered to rotate duties one final time, with Kaiserin Elisabeth going to China, and Kaiser Franz Joseph I returning to Austria-Hungary in 1914.

=== World War I ===
Kaiser Franz Joseph I underway

The assassination of Archduke Franz Ferdinand on 28 June 1914 in Sarajevo triggered a chain of events which led to the July Crisis and Austria-Hungary's subsequent declaration of war on Serbia on 28 July. Events unfolded rapidly in the ensuing days. On 30 July 1914 Russia declared full mobilization in response to Austria-Hungary's declaration of war on Serbia. Austria-Hungary declared full mobilization the next day. On 1 August both Germany and France ordered full mobilization and Germany declared war on Russia in support of Austria-Hungary. While relations between Austria-Hungary and Italy had improved greatly in the two years following the 1912 renewal of the Triple Alliance, increased Austro-Hungarian naval spending, political disputes over influence in Albania, and Italian concerns over the potential annexation of land in the Kingdom of Montenegro caused the relationship between the two allies to falter in the months leading up to the war. Italy declared neutrality on 1 August, citing Austria-Hungary's declaration of war on Serbia as an act of aggression, which was not covered under the Triple Alliance.

By 4 August Germany had already occupied Luxembourg and invaded Belgium after declaring war on France, and the United Kingdom had declared war on Germany in support of Belgian neutrality. Following France and Britain's declarations of war on Austria-Hungary on 11 and 12 August respectively, the French Admiral Augustin Boué de Lapeyrère was issued orders to close off Austro-Hungarian shipping at the entrance to the Adriatic Sea and to engage any Austro-Hungarian ships his Anglo-French fleet came across. Lapeyrère chose to attack the Austro-Hungarian ships blockading Montenegro. The ensuing Battle of Antivari ended Austria-Hungary's blockade, and effectively placed the Strait of Otranto firmly in the hands of Britain and France. At the start of the war, Kaiser Franz Joseph I was assigned to the Fifth Battle Division, alongside the three Monarch-class coastal defense ships, and the cruiser Panther at the Austro-Hungarian naval base at Cattaro. Rear Admiral Richard von Barry was assigned command of this division, which was tasked with coastal defense roles. After the loss of the cruiser Zenta at the Battle of Antivari, Austro-Hungarian Marinekommandant Anton Haus blamed Barry for failing to intercept the French forces and relieved him of command in October 1914, replacing him with Rear Admiral Alexander Hansa.

Kaiser Franz Joseph I served as a harbor defense ship for most of the remainder of the war, though she did see action against Montenegrin batteries atop Mount Lovćen, which overshadowed the Bocche di Cattaro, where she was stationed. In September 1914, a French landing party of 140 men assisted Montenegrin troops in installing eight heavy artillery pieces on the slopes of Mount Lovćen. This bolstered the artillery Montenegro had already placed on the mountain, and posed a major threat to the Austro-Hungarian base located at Cattaro. Throughout September and October, the Austro-Hungarian Fifth Division and the Franco-Montenegrin artillery dueled for control over the Bocche. The arrival of the Austro-Hungarian Radetzky-class battleships knocked out two of the French guns and forced the remainder to withdraw beyond the range of the Austro-Hungarian guns. In late November, the French withdrew and handed the guns over to Montenegro to maintain. Meanwhile, Kaiser Franz Joseph I's sister ship, Kaiserin Elisabeth would be the second Austro-Hungarian warship to be sunk during the war, having been trapped in China at the outbreak of hostilities. She was ultimately scuttled in early November at the German-held Kiautschou Bay concession during the Anglo-Japanese Siege of Tsingtao.

==== 1916–1918 ====
In late 1915, it was decided by Austria-Hungary and Germany that after finally conquering Serbia, Montenegro would be knocked out of the war next. On 8 January 1916, Kaiser Franz Joseph I and the other ships of the Fifth Division began a barrage which would last three days against the Montenegrin fortifications on Mount Lovćen. The sustained artillery bombardment allowed the Austro-Hungarian XIX Army Corps to capture the mountain on 11 January. Two days later, Austro-Hungarian forces entered Montenegro's capital of Cetinje, knocking Montenegro out of the war. After the conquest of Montenegro, Kaiser Franz Joseph I remained at anchor in the Bocce di Cattaro for the remainder of the war. She almost never ventured outside of Cattaro for the next two years.

==== Cattaro Mutiny ====
Kaiser Franz Joseph I at anchor in Cattaro during World War I

By early 1918, the long periods of inactivity had begun to wear on the crews of several Austro-Hungarian ships at Cattaro, primarily those of ships which saw little combat. On 1 February, the Cattaro Mutiny broke out, starting aboard Sankt Georg. The mutineers rapidly gained control of most of the warships in the harbor, while others such as Kaiser Franz Joseph I flew the red flag despite remaining neutral in the rebellion. The crews of the cruisers Novara and Helgoland resisted the mutiny, with the latter preparing their ship's torpedoes, but rebels aboard the Sankt Georg aimed their 24 cm (9.4 in) guns at Helgoland, forcing them to back down. Novara's commander, Johannes, Prinz von Liechtenstein, initially refused to allow a rebel party to board his vessel, but after the rebel-held cruiser Kaiser Karl VI trained her guns on Novara, he relented and let the crew fly a red flag in support of the mutiny. Liechtenstein and Erich von Heyssler, the commander of Helgoland, discussed overnight how to extricate their vessels, their crews having abstained from actively supporting the rebels.

The following day, many of the mutinous ships abandoned the effort and rejoined loyalist forces in the inner harbor after shore batteries loyal to the Austro-Hungarian government opened fire on the rebel-held Kronprinz Erzherzog Rudolf. Liechtenstein tore down the red flag before ordering his ship to escape into the inner harbor; they were joined by the other scout cruisers and most of the torpedo boats, followed by several of the other larger vessels. There, they were protected by shore batteries that opposed the mutiny. By late in the day, only the men aboard Sankt Georg and a handful of destroyers and torpedo boats remained in rebellion. The next morning, the Erzherzog Karl-class battleships arrived from Pola and put down the uprising. In the immediate aftermath of the mutiny, Kaiser Franz Joseph I's complement was reduced to a caretaker crew while the cruiser was converted into a barracks ship. Her guns were also removed for use on the mainland.

After the Cattaro Mutiny, Admiral Maximilian Njegovan was fired as Commander-in-Chief (German: Flottenkommandant) of the Navy, though at Njegovan's request it was announced that he was retiring. Miklós Horthy, who had since been promoted to commander of the battleship Prinz Eugen, was promoted to rear admiral and named as the Flottenkommandant of the Austro-Hungarian Navy.

==== End of the war ====
Kaiser Franz Joseph I at anchor

By October 1918 it had become clear that Austria-Hungary was facing defeat in the war. With various attempts to quell nationalist sentiments failing, Emperor Karl I decided to sever Austria-Hungary's alliance with Germany and appeal to the Allied Powers in an attempt to preserve the empire from complete collapse. On 26 October Austria-Hungary informed Germany that their alliance was over. At the same time, the Austro-Hungarian Navy was in the process of tearing itself apart along ethnic and nationalist lines. Horthy was informed on the morning of 28 October that an armistice was imminent, and used this news to maintain order and prevent another mutiny among the fleet.

On 29 October the National Council in Zagreb announced Croatia's dynastic ties to Hungary had come to a formal conclusion. The National Council also called for Croatia and Dalmatia to be unified, with Slovene and Bosnian organizations pledging their loyalty to the newly formed government. This new provisional government, while throwing off Hungarian rule, had not yet declared independence from Austria-Hungary. Thus Emperor Karl I's government in Vienna asked the newly formed State of Slovenes, Croats and Serbs for help maintaining the fleet and keeping order among the navy. The National Council refused to assist unless the Austro-Hungarian Navy was first placed under its command. Emperor Karl I, still attempting to save the Empire from collapse, agreed to the transfer, provided that the other "nations" which made up Austria-Hungary would be able to claim their fair share of the value of the fleet at a later time. All sailors not of Slovene, Croatian, Bosnian, or Serbian background were placed on leave for the time being, while the officers were given the choice of joining the new navy or retiring.

The Austro-Hungarian government thus decided to hand over the bulk of its fleet to the State of Slovenes, Croats and Serbs without a shot being fired. This was considered preferential to handing the fleet to the Allies, as the new state had declared its neutrality. Furthermore, the newly formed state had also not yet publicly dethroned Emperor Karl I, keeping the possibility of reforming the Empire into a triple monarchy alive. The transfer to the State of Slovenes, Croats and Serbs began on the morning of 31 October, with Horthy meeting representatives from the South Slav nationalities aboard his flagship, Viribus Unitis in Pola. After "short and cool" negotiations, the arrangements were settled and the handover was completed that afternoon. The Austro-Hungarian Naval Ensign was struck from Viribus Unitis, and was followed by the remaining ships in the harbor. Control over the battleship, and the head of the newly-established navy for the State of Slovenes, Croats and Serbs, fell to Captain Janko Vuković, who was raised to the rank of admiral and took over Horthy's old responsibilities as Commander-in-Chief of the Fleet.

=== Post-war ===
Despite the transfer, on 3 November 1918 the Austro-Hungarian government signed the Armistice of Villa Giusti with Italy, ending the fighting along the Italian Front. The Armistice of Villa Giusti refused to recognize the transfer of Austria-Hungary's warships to the State of Slovenes, Croats and Serbs. As a result, on 4 November 1918, Italian ships sailed into the ports of Trieste, Pola, and Fiume. On 5 November, Italian troops occupied the naval installations at Pola. While the State of Slovenes, Croats and Serbs attempted to hold onto their ships, they lacked the men and officers to do so as most sailors who were not South Slavs had already gone home. The National Council did not order any men to resist the Italians, but they also condemned Italy's actions as illegitimate. On 9 November, Italian, British, and French ships sailed into Cattaro and seized the remaining Austro-Hungarian ships, including Kaiser Franz Joseph I, which had been turned over to the National Council. At a conference at Corfu, the Allied Powers agreed the transfer of Austria-Hungary's Navy to the State of Slovenes, Croats and Serbs could not be accepted, despite sympathy from the United Kingdom. Faced with the prospect of being given an ultimatum to hand over the former Austro-Hungarian warships, the National Council agreed to hand over all the ships transferred to them by the Austro-Hungarian Empire, to include Kaiser Franz Joseph I, beginning on 10 November 1918.

While Cattaro remained under Allied occupation after the war, Kaiser Franz Joseph I remained under the administration of France as it would not be until 1920 when the final distribution of the ships was settled among the Allied powers under the terms of the Treaty of Saint-Germain-en-Laye. While under French control, she was converted into an ammunition ship, but sank while moored in the Bocche di Cattaro during a heavy gale on 17 October 1919. Her sinking was attributed to several open hatches and her top-heaviness due to the ammunition stored aboard. In 1922, a Dutch salvage company discovered the Kaiser Franz Joseph I and began salvaging operations. Some of her fittings, including her deck cranes, were ultimately salvaged, though most of the ship remained intact at the bottom of the bay. In 1967, the Yugoslav salvage company Brodospas salvaged the wreck as well.
