= SMS Kaiserin und Königin Maria Theresia =

Armored cruiser of the Austro-Hungarian Navy

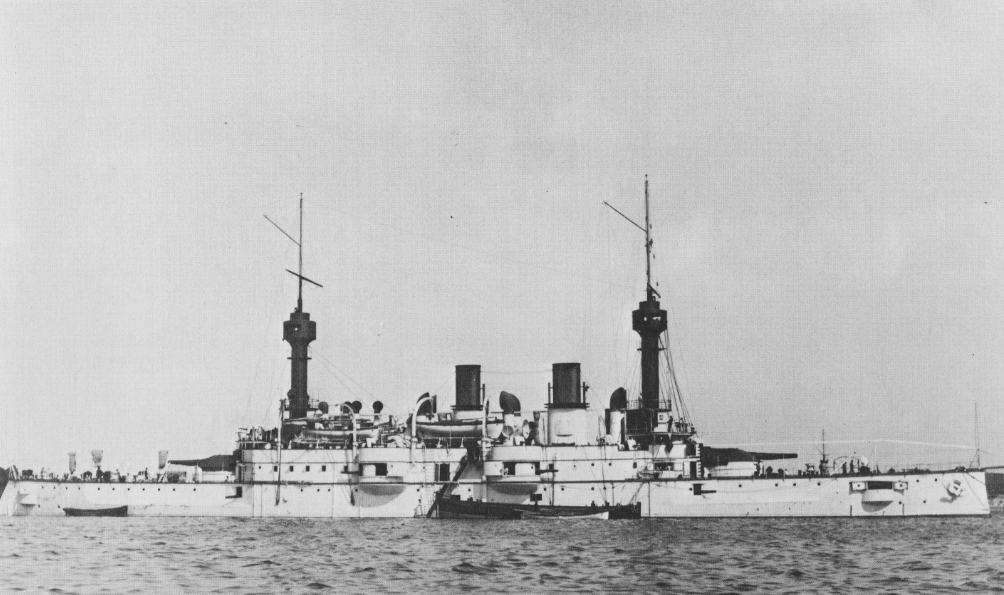
- Kaiserin und Königin Maria Theresia, sometime between 1898 and 1900

Class overview
- Preceded by: None
- Succeeded by: Kaiser Karl VI

History

Austro-Hungarian Empire
- Name: SMS Kaiserin und Königin Maria Theresia
- Namesake: Empress and Queen Maria Theresa
- Builder: Stabilimento Tecnico Triestino
- Laid down: 1 July 1891
- Launched: 29 April 1893
- Commissioned: November 1894
- Fate: Ceded to Britain in 1920, broken up for scrap

General characteristics
- Type: Armored cruiser
- Displacement: Design: 5,330 long tons (5,420 t); Full load: 6,026 long tons (6,123 t)
- Length: 113.7 m (373 ft)
- Beam: 16.25 m (53 ft 4 in)
- Draft: 6.81 m (22 ft 4 in)
- Installed power: 6 × fire-tube boilers; 9,755 ihp (7,274 kW)
- Propulsion: 2 × triple-expansion steam engines; 2 × screw propellers
- Speed: 19.35 knots (36 km/h; 22 mph)
- Complement: 475
- Armament: 2 × 24 cm (9.4 in) K L/35 guns; 8 × 15 cm (5.9 in) SK L/35 guns; 2 × 66 mm (2.6 in) L/18 landing guns; 12 × 47 mm (1.9 in) L/44 guns; 6 × 47 mm L/33 Hotchkiss guns; 4 × 45 cm (17.7 in) torpedo tubes
- Armor: Belt armor: 100 mm (3.9 in); Armor deck: 38 to 57 mm (1.5 to 2.2 in); Turrets: 100 mm; Casemates: 80 mm (3.1 in); Conning tower: 50 mm (2.0 in)

SMS Kaiserin und Königin Maria Theresia ("Empress and Queen Maria Theresa") was an armored cruiser used by the imperial Austro-Hungarian Navy from 1895 to 1917; she was the first ship of that type built by the Austro-Hungarian Navy. The ship was a unique design, built by the Stabilimento Tecnico Triestino shipyard in Trieste; she was laid down in July 1891, launched in April 1893, and completed in November 1894. Armed with a main battery of two 24-centimeter (9.4 in) guns and eight 15 cm (5.9 in) guns, the ship provided the basis for two subsequent armored cruiser designs for the Austro-Hungarian Navy.

In 1898, Kaiserin und Königin Maria Theresia was deployed to the Caribbean to safeguard Austro-Hungarian interests during the Spanish–American War; she inadvertently arrived off Santiago de Cuba on the morning the Spanish squadron attempted to escape from the American blockade, and was nearly attacked herself. In 1900, she was sent to China to assist in the suppression of the Boxer Uprising, and remained in East Asian waters until 1902. She was heavily modernized between 1906 and 1910, and served in the 1st Cruiser Division after returning to the fleet. She was used first as a harbor guard ship and then as a barracks ship during World War I. After the end of the war, she was surrendered to Britain as a war prize and broken up for scrap in 1920.

== Design ==
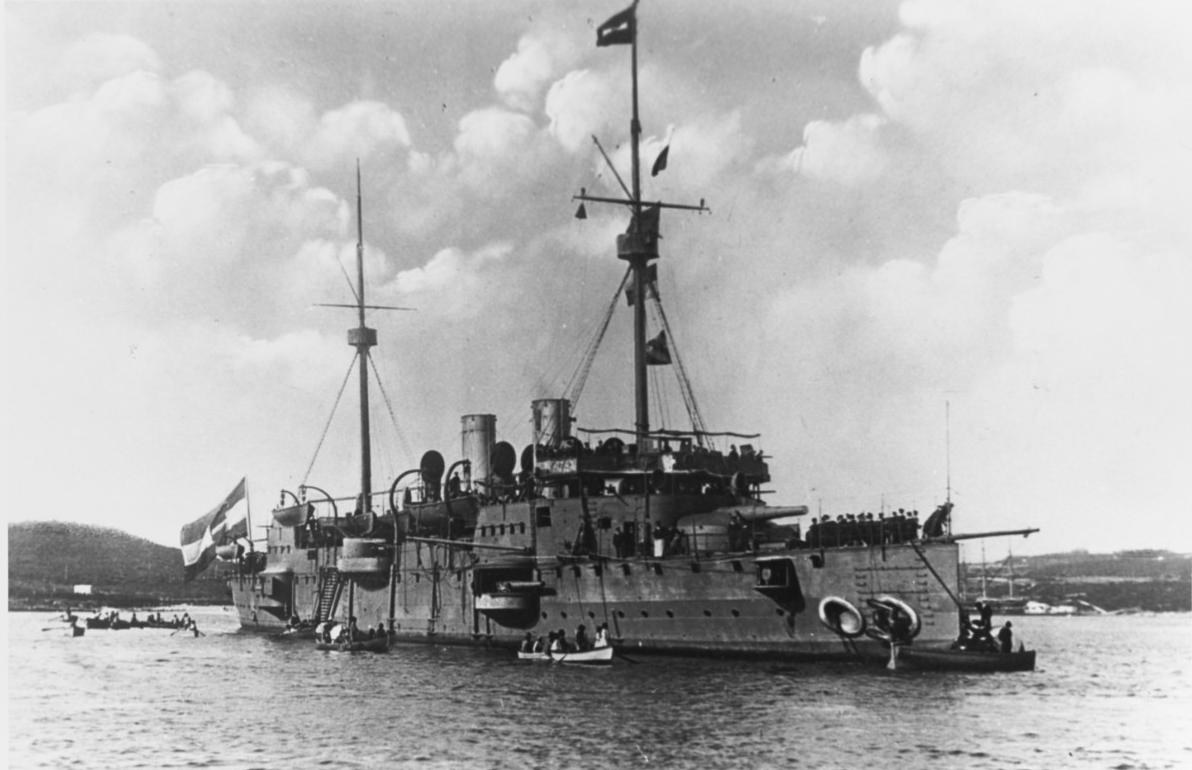
Kaiserin Elisabeth, one of the two Kaiser Franz Joseph I-class cruisers that provided the starting point for the Kaiserin und Königin Maria Theresia design

Starting in the mid-1880s, the new Austro-Hungarian Marinekommandant (Navy Commander), Vizeadmiral (Vice Admiral) Maximilian Daublebsky von Sterneck, began a reorientation of Austro-Hungarian naval strategy. The fleet had until then been centered on large ironclad warships, but had been unable to continue building vessels of that type under the direction of the previous Marinekommandant, Vizeadmiral Friedrich von Pöck, owing to the refusal of the Imperial Council of Austria and the Diet of Hungary to grant sufficient naval budgets. Sterneck decided to adopt the concepts espoused by the French Jeune École (Young School), which suggested that flotillas of cheap torpedo boats could effectively defend a coastline against a fleet of expensive battleships. The torpedo boats would be supported by what Sterneck termed "torpedo-ram-cruisers", which would protect the torpedo boats from enemy cruisers.

In his fleet plan for 1891, Sterneck proposed that the future Austro-Hungarian fleet would consist of four squadrons, each consisting of one torpedo-ram-cruiser, a smaller torpedo cruiser, a large torpedo boat and six smaller torpedo boats. The Navy had already secured parliamentary approval for two of his proposed torpedo-ram-cruisers, the Kaiser Franz Joseph I class, and three of the torpedo cruisers, the two Panther-class vessels and Tiger. A third ship, provisionally designated Torpedo-Ram Cruiser C, was authorized in 1889 to begin construction under the forthcoming 1890 fiscal year, and was originally planned to displace 4,000 long tons (4,100 t), but by that time, improved armor types became available, raising the possibility that the next vessel could incorporate traditional belt armor; earlier vessels were protected cruisers, relying solely on a sloped armor deck to shield their propulsion machinery and ammunition magazines.

The decision to adopt belt armor led the design staff to consider new options later in 1889. The first was a simple enlargement of the Kaiser Franz Joseph I design, increasing the displacement to 5,100 long tons (5,200 t); the second was similar to the French armored cruiser Dupuy de Lôme that displaced 6,220 long tons (6,320 t). The gun armament was to consist of two 24 cm (9.4 in) guns in individual gun turrets. The designers prepared two variants of the latter proposal, the first mimicking the unusual French decision to carry its main armament in wing turrets located amidships, and the latter adopting the traditional fore and aft arrangement. The Navy ultimately chose the 5100-ton design, and the contract was awarded to Stabilimento Tecnico Triestino, the Austrian dockyard in Trieste. The two subsequent armored cruisers, Kaiser Karl VI and Sankt Georg, were improved versions of this design.

=== Characteristics ===
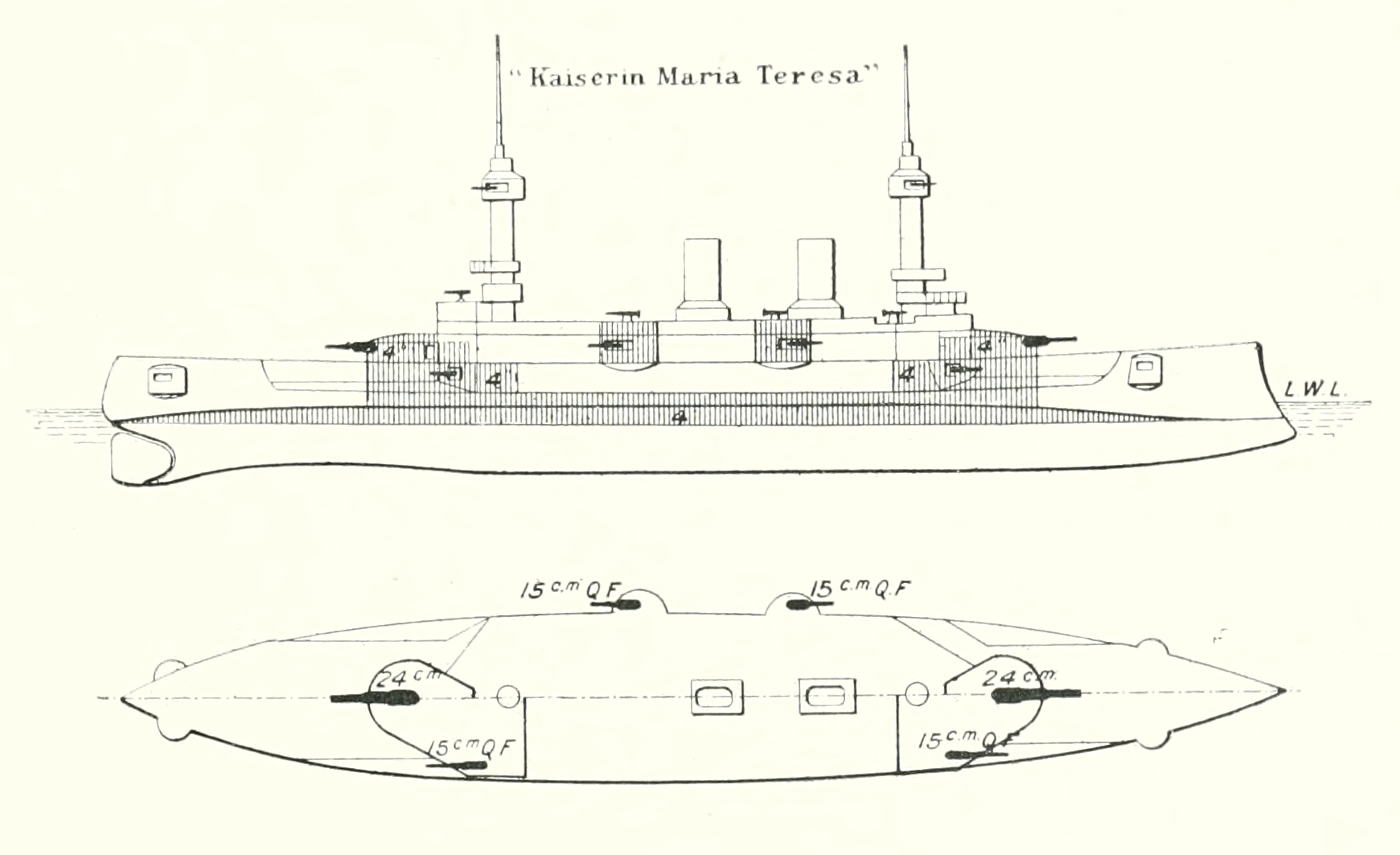
Line-drawing of Kaiserin und Königin Maria Theresia

Kaiserin und Königin Maria Theresia was 111.67 meters (366 ft 4 in) long at the waterline and 113.7 m (373 ft) long overall. She had a beam of 16.25 m (53 ft 4 in) and a draft of 6.81 m (22 ft 4 in). The displacement of the ship grew over the course of construction, and by the time the ship was finished, she displaced 5,330 long tons (5,420 t) as designed, and at full load she displaced 6,026 long tons (6,123 t). Her hull incorporated a pronounced ram bow. A pair of heavy military masts were fitted initially, but they proved to negatively affect the ship's stability, so they were removed later in her career. She had a crew of 32 officers and 443 men. Steering was controlled with a single rudder.

The ship was powered by two 3-cylinder, horizontal triple-expansion steam engines, with steam provided by six coal-burning fire-tube boilers that were ducted into two funnels. Her propulsion system was rated to produce 9,000 indicated horsepower (9,100 PS) for a top speed of 19 knots (35 km/h; 22 mph), though she reached 19.35 knots (35.84 km/h; 22.27 mph) on speed trials. Coal storage amounted to 9,746 long tons (9,902 t), which allowed Kaiserin und Königin Maria Theresia to steam for 3,500 nautical miles (6,500 km; 4,000 mi) at a cruising speed of 10 knots (19 km/h; 12 mph).

Kaiserin und Königin Maria Theresia was armed with a main battery of two 24 cm (9.4 in) K L/35 guns, manufactured by Krupp, and mounted in two single turrets, one forward and one aft. These guns were the primary offensive armament, and they were installed in electrically trained turrets. These guns were supported by a secondary battery of eight Krupp 15 cm (5.9 in) SK L/35 guns, which were placed in individual casemate mounts, four on the main deck and four in the upper deck. For defense against torpedo boats, she carried twelve Skoda 47 mm (1.9 in) L/44 guns and six Hotchkiss 47 mm L/33 guns; these guns were individually mounted in casemates, sponsons, or open mounts. She also carried a pair of 7 cm L/18 landing guns, which could be taken ashore to provide support for a landing party. Her armament was rounded out by four 45 cm (17.7 in) torpedo tubes, one in the bow, one in the stern, and one on each side.

The ship was protected by an armored belt that was 100 mm (3.9 in) of steel armor. The main deck was 38 to 57 mm (1.5 to 2.2 in) thick, sloping down at the sides to meet the bottom edge of the belt. The turrets were protected by 100 mm of armor plate and they sat atop 150 mm barbettes. The secondary casemates received 80 mm (3.1 in) of protection, and the forward conning tower had 50 mm (2 in) sides.

=== Modifications ===
The ship was modernized several times in her career, with emphasis placed on reducing topweight; in addition to replacing the military masts with simple pole masts by 1903, her superstructure was also reduced. Two of her 47 mm guns were removed in 1904 in another attempt to improve her stability. In 1906, her old 24 cm guns were replaced with a pair of modern, quick-firing 19 cm (7.6 in) SK L/42 guns in new, smaller turrets. By 1910, further alterations were made, which included further reductions to her superstructure. Larger funnels were installed to improve ventilation from the boilers and thus engine performance. Her 15 cm guns were relocated; the main-deck guns were moved to the upper deck, and all eight guns were moved further to either end of the superstructure, now mounted in embrasures. Two were placed on either side of the forward conning tower and the other four were placed abreast of the rear tower.

== Service history ==
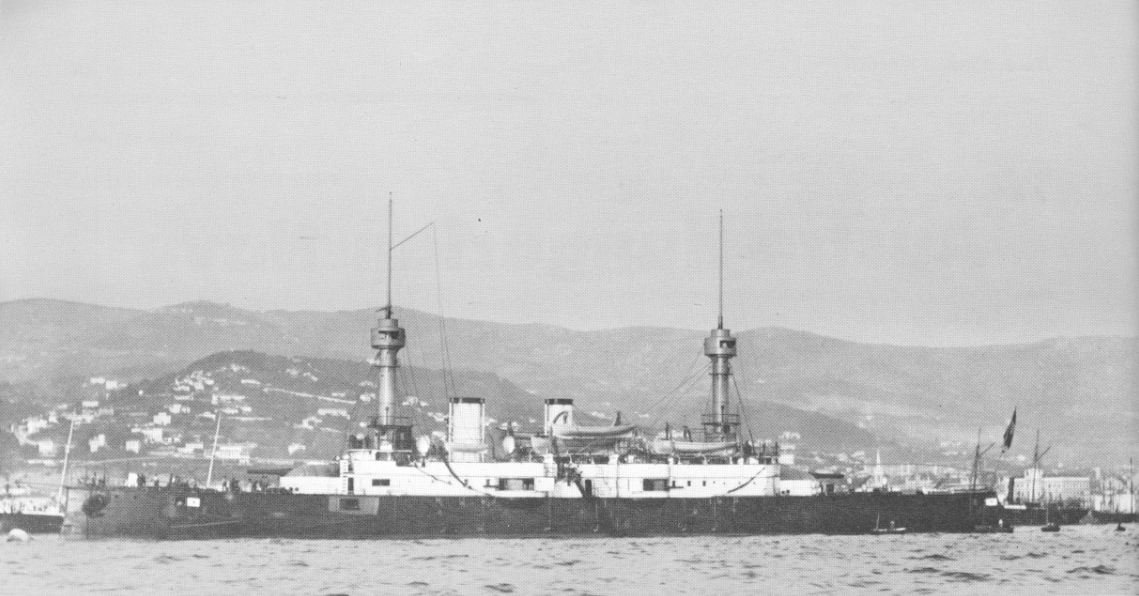
Kaiserin und Königin Maria Theresia, probably shortly after her completion in 1895

Kaiserin und Königin Maria Theresia was laid down on 1 June 1891, launched on 29 April 1893, and was commissioned into the fleet in November 1894. In 1895, Archduke Charles Stephen of Austria took a squadron of warships, including Kaiserin und Königin Maria Theresia, to Germany to participate in the celebrations for the opening of the Kiel Canal. The squadron called on the port of Brest, France on the way, and stopped in Portsmouth on the return voyage.

In February 1897, Kaiserin und Königin Maria Theresia joined the International Squadron, a multinational force made up of ships of the Austro-Hungarian Navy, French Navy, Imperial German Navy, Italian Royal Navy (Regia Marina), Imperial Russian Navy, and Royal Navy that intervened in the 1897-1898 Greek uprising on Crete against rule by the Ottoman Empire; the Austro-Hungarian force was the third-largest contingent after those of the Italians and the British. The squadron operated until December 1898, but the Austro-Hungarians and Germans were dissatisfied with the compromise worked out for the settlement of the conflict on Crete, and so they withdrew their contingents early, Germany in November 1897 and Austria-Hungary in March 1898.

In 1898, Kaiserin und Königin Maria Theresia was dispatched to Cuba during the Spanish–American War, to evacuate Austrian and German nationals in the city of Santiago. The ship arrived off Santiago on 3 July, the day the Spanish admiral Pascual Cervera y Topete attempted to break out of the harbor, through the American blockade. The American auxiliary vessel USS Resolute spotted Kaiserin und Königin Maria Theresia approaching US Army transports off Siboney and Daiquirí. Resolute informed the battleship USS Indiana about a "Spanish battleship" attacking the army ships, after which Indiana steamed to engage the supposed Spanish warship. After closing to 6,000 yards (5,500 m), Indiana's captain identified Kaiserin und Königin Maria Theresia shortly before his gunners would have opened fire. The Austrian cruiser had similar run-ins with other vessels of the American fleet as it sought permission from the American commander to perform its evacuation. After inspecting her, Admiral William T. Sampson, the American commander, permitted the Austrian cruiser to enter the harbor for her mission. After picking up the evacuees, Kaiserin und Königin Maria Theresia went to Port Royal, Jamaica, and remained in the Caribbean until the end of the war. On 9 May, she departed, bound for Pola, and arrived on 9 December. Over the winter of 1898–1899, the ship served in the winter training squadron along with the battleship Budapest.

As anti-foreign violence began to rise in China in early 1900, the Great Powers began to send warships to the Far East to increase the pressure on the Chinese government to rein in the violence. At the peak of the Boxer Uprising, Kaiserin und Königin Maria Theresia was deployed to the area under the command of Victor Ritter Bless von Sambuchi, along with numerous other European warships. She left Pola in June, and was followed by the cruisers Kaiserin Elisabeth and Aspern the next month. The ships joined the international fleet off Taku in September 1900, though by that time, most of the fighting had already occurred. Nevertheless, Kaiserin und Königin Maria Theresia and Aspern remained in East Asian waters for an extended deployment. Captain Anton Haus took command of the ship, and in June 1901, he took the ship to Hankow up the Yangtze River; she was the largest ship to have steamed that far up the river. She returned to Austria-Hungary in 1902, and was replaced in China by the new armored cruiser Kaiser Karl VI.

Between 1906–1908 and 1909–1910, the ship was rebuilt and equipped with more modern main guns. The 24 cm guns were replaced with quick-firing 19 cm L/42 guns manufactured by Skoda. Four 37 mm Vickers revolving cannon were also installed. The ship's heavy fighting masts were removed. In 1912, the ship was sent to Salonika to safeguard Austro-Hungarian interests during the Balkan Wars. She was then assigned to the 1st Cruiser Division, and remained in that unit after the outbreak of World War I in August 1914. It consisted of the other two armored cruisers in the fleet, and three light cruisers, under the command of Vice Admiral Paul Fiedler. She was used as a harbor guard ship in Šibenik starting in 1914. In 1916, she was withdrawn from service and disarmed the following year for use as a barracks ship for German U-boat crews operating out of the Austrian naval base at Pola. Her guns were converted for use on land and sent to the Italian front. After the end of the war, in 1920, Kaiserin und Königin Maria Theresia was allocated to Britain as a war prize. The British sold her to an Italian ship-breaking firm, which broke her up for scrap.
