= Kumbor =

Village in Herceg Novi, Montenegro

Kumbor Кумбор
- Town
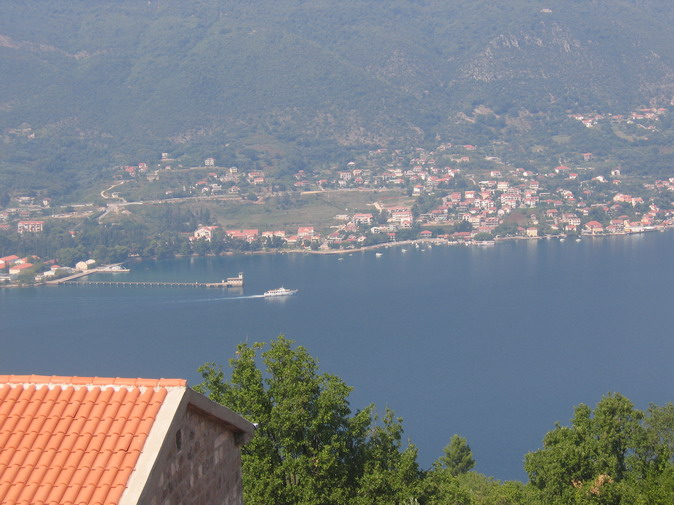

- Location within Montenegro
- Country: Montenegro
- Region: Coastal
- Municipality: Herceg Novi

Population (2011)
  - Total: 925
- Time zone: UTC+1 (CET)
  - Summer (DST): UTC+2 (CEST)

Kumbor (Serbian Cyrillic: Кумбор) is a small town in the municipality of Herceg Novi, Montenegro.

== Demographics ==
According to the 2003 census, the town had a population of 1,067 people, 47,89% Serbs, 31,30% Montenegrins and 3,56% Croats.

According to the 2011 census, its population was 925.

Ethnicity in 2011
Ethnicity	Number	Percentage
Serbs	393	42.5%
Montenegrins	321	34.7%
Croats	28	3.0%
Roma	17	1.8%
Slovenians	7	0.8%
other/undeclared	159	17.2%
Total	925	100%
