= SMS Kaiserin Elisabeth =

Austro-Hungarian Navy steamboat

- Kaiserin Elisabeth at anchor

History

Austria-Hungary
- Name: SMS Kaiserin Elisabeth
- Builder: Pola Navy Yard
- Launched: 25 September 1890
- Fate: Scuttled 2 November 1914

General characteristics
- Type: Kaiser Franz Joseph I-class protected cruiser
- Displacement: 3,967 long tons (4,031 t)
- Length: 103.7 m (340 ft 3 in)
- Beam: 14.75 m (48 ft 5 in)
- Draft: 5.7 m (18 ft 8 in)
- Propulsion: 8,450 ihp (6,300 kW), two shafts
- Speed: 19 knots (35 km/h)
- Armament: 2 × 9.4 in (24 cm)/35; 6 × 5.9 in (15 cm)/35; 2 × 66 mm (2.6 in)/18; 5 × 47 mm (1.9 in)/44 guns; 4 × 4.7 cm L/33 Hotchkiss guns; 3 × 3.7 cm L/23 Hotchkiss guns; 4 × 45 cm (18 in) torpedo tubes

SMS Kaiserin Elisabeth was a Kaiser Franz Joseph I-class protected cruiser of the Austro-Hungarian Navy. Named in honor of the Empress Elisabeth, consort of Emperor Franz Josef, the cruiser was designed for overseas service and in fact was stationed in China at the outbreak of World War I in 1914.

== Specifications ==
Launched at the naval shipyard at Pola on 25 September 1890, Kaiserin Elisabeth was a steel-hulled vessel of 3,967 tons displacement. She measured 321 feet (98 m) in waterline length with a beam of 49 feet (15 m) and a mean draft of 19 feet (5.8 m). The crew comprised 450 officers and men.

=== Propulsion ===
Propulsion was provided by two sets of horizontal triple expansion engines with four cylindrical double-ended boilers. Designed performance was 6,400 horsepower (4,800 kW) for 18 knots (33 km/h; 21 mph) and 8,000 horsepower (6,000 kW) for 19 knots (35 km/h; 22 mph); on trials she in fact reached 20 knots (37 km/h; 23 mph).

=== Armament ===
Originally Kaiserin Elisabeth was armed with two 24 cm (9.4 in) and six 15 cm (5.9 in) guns, both types Model 1886. In 1905-06 she was reconstructed with two long-barreled 15 cm and six short-barreled 15 cm guns, both types Model 1901. Rounding out her armament were 16 47 mm (1.9 in) quick-firing guns, one machine gun and four 14-inch (360 mm) torpedo tubes located above water, two on either beam.

== Service ==
Although Kaiserin Elisabeth burned enormous quantities of coal, in 1914 she could still steam at a very fair speed and was stationed in China. Upon the outbreak of the First World War, Kaiserin Elisabeth took part in the defense of the German colony of Qingdao, which was besieged by the Japanese on 25 August 1914; Japan had declared war on Germany on 23 August and the presence of Kaiserin Elisabeth led to Japan declaring war on Austria-Hungary on 25 August. At Qingdao with Kaiserin Elisabeth were the Imperial German Navy light cruiser Cormoran, gunboats Iltis, Jaguar, Tiger and Luchs and the torpedo boat S90. (The German East Asia Squadron, normally based at Tsingtao, had made a dash for home across the Pacific.) The ship′s crew was divided into two groups; one continued manning the ship, while the other bolstered the German garrison.

On 6 September 1914 the first air-sea battle in history took place when a Japanese Farman MF.11 aircraft launched by the seaplane carrier Wakamiya unsuccessfully attacked Kaiserin Elisabeth with bombs.

Early in the siege Kaiserin Elisabeth and Jaguar made a sortie against the Japanese. Later, Kaiserin Elisabeth's 15 cm and 4.7 cm guns were removed and mounted ashore in "Batterie Elisabeth." As the siege progressed, the naval vessels trapped in the harbor were scuttled -- Cormoran, Iltis and Luchs on 28 September, S90 on 17 October and Tiger on 29 October. Finally, Kaiserin Elisabeth was scuttled on 2 November, followed by Jaguar on 7 November, the day the fortress surrendered to the Japanese.

== Bibliography ==
- Barovič, Jože. Mornarica dvojne monarhije v I. svetovni vojni, Maribor 2005, COBISS 2022207
- Greger, René (1976). Austro-Hungarian Warships of World War I. London: Ian Allan. ISBN 0-7110-0623-7.
- Gogg, Karl. Österreichische Kriegsmarine 1848-1918, Salzburg, 1967,
- Sieche, Erwin (2002). Kreuzer und Kreuzerprojekte der k.u.k. Kriegsmarine 1889–1918 [Cruisers and Cruiser Projects of the Austro-Hungarian Navy, 1889–1918] (in German). Hamburg. ISBN 3-8132-0766-8.
- Nistor, Dumitru (2017). Ziuariul meu [My (War) Diary] (in Romanian). Cluj Napoca. ISBN 978-606-797-221-4.
