= Coal bin =

Storage container for coal

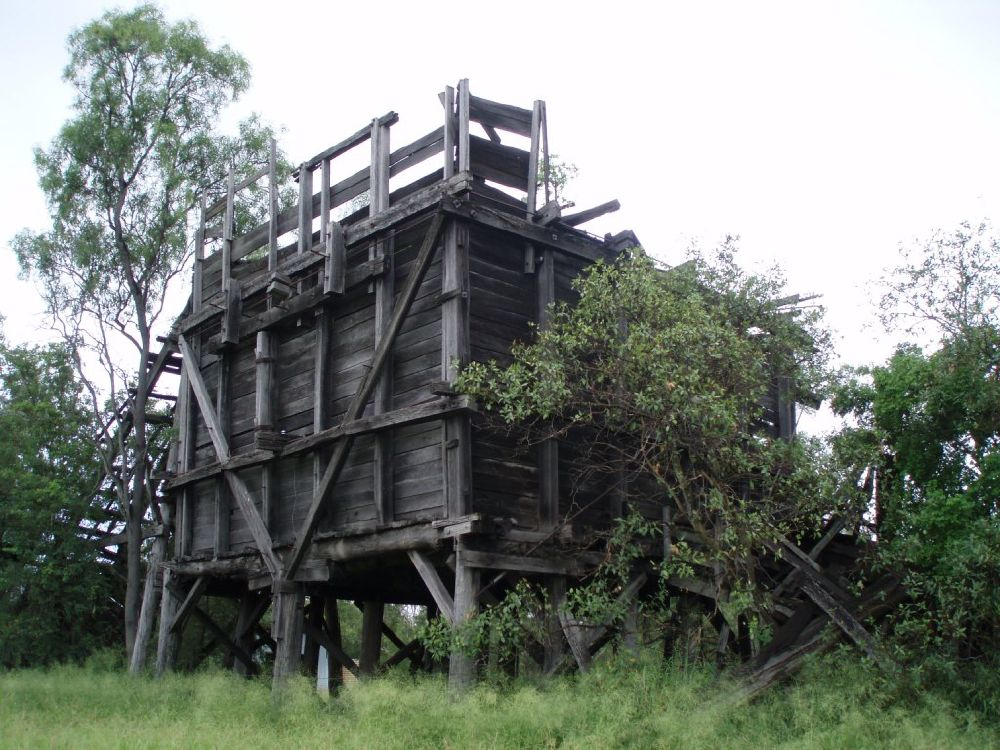
Coal bin at Dawson Valley Colliery, Australia, seen in 2008

A coal bin, coal store or coal bunker is a storage container for coal awaiting use or transportation. This can be either in domestic, commercial or industrial premises, or on a ship or locomotive tender, or at a coal mine or processing plant.

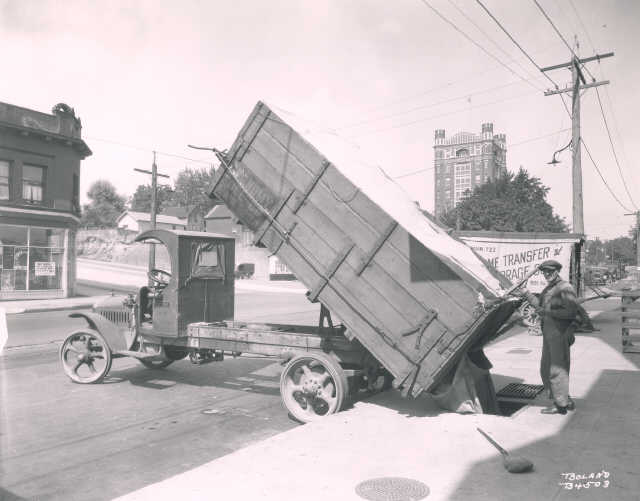
Coal delivery in 1921 to an underground coal bin through an opening in the pavement

Domestic coal bunkers are associated with the use of coal in open fires or for solid-fuel central heating. Free-standing bunkers were commonly made of wood or concrete and are currently sold in materials including plastic or galvanised metal. Coal bins or bunkers could also form an outhouse or be partly or fully underground.

Coal bins form or formed part of industrial plants, and were found on steam ships.

== See also ==
- Tender (rail)
