= List of battleships of the Netherlands =

This is a list of Dutch battleships of the period 1894-1944. Also considered in the list are shortened versions of battleships, coastal defense ships (sometimes also called coastal defense battleships).

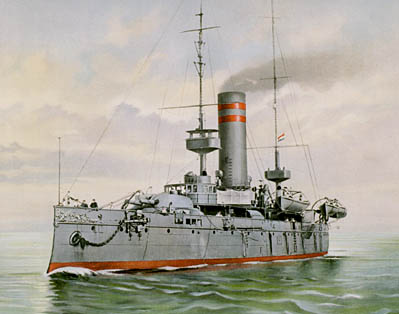
Coastal defense ship Hr. Ms. Evertsen

- Evertsen class
  - Evertsen (1894) - BU 1914
  - Piet Hein (1894) - Discarded 1914
  - Kortenaer (1894) - Discarded 1920
- Koningin Regentes class
  - Koningin Regentes (1900) - Discarded 1920
  - De Ruyter (1901) - Discarded 1923
  - Hertog Hendrik (1902) - Hulked 1945
- Marten Harpertszoon Tromp (1904) - BU 1932
- Jacob Van Heemskerck (1906) - Hulked 1948
- De Zeven Provincien (1909) - Sunk 1942, salvaged by Japan and recommissioned, sunk 1943
- ? class (not built)
  - 6 ships?

Dreadnoughts

- 1913 proposal (none begun)
  - (up to 9 ships planned)

Battlecruisers

- Design 1047 (none begun)
  - (3 planned)

== See also ==
- List of battleships
- List of cruisers of the Netherlands
- List of monitors of the Netherlands
- List of ships of the Royal Netherlands Navy
