= HNLMS Friesland (1896) =

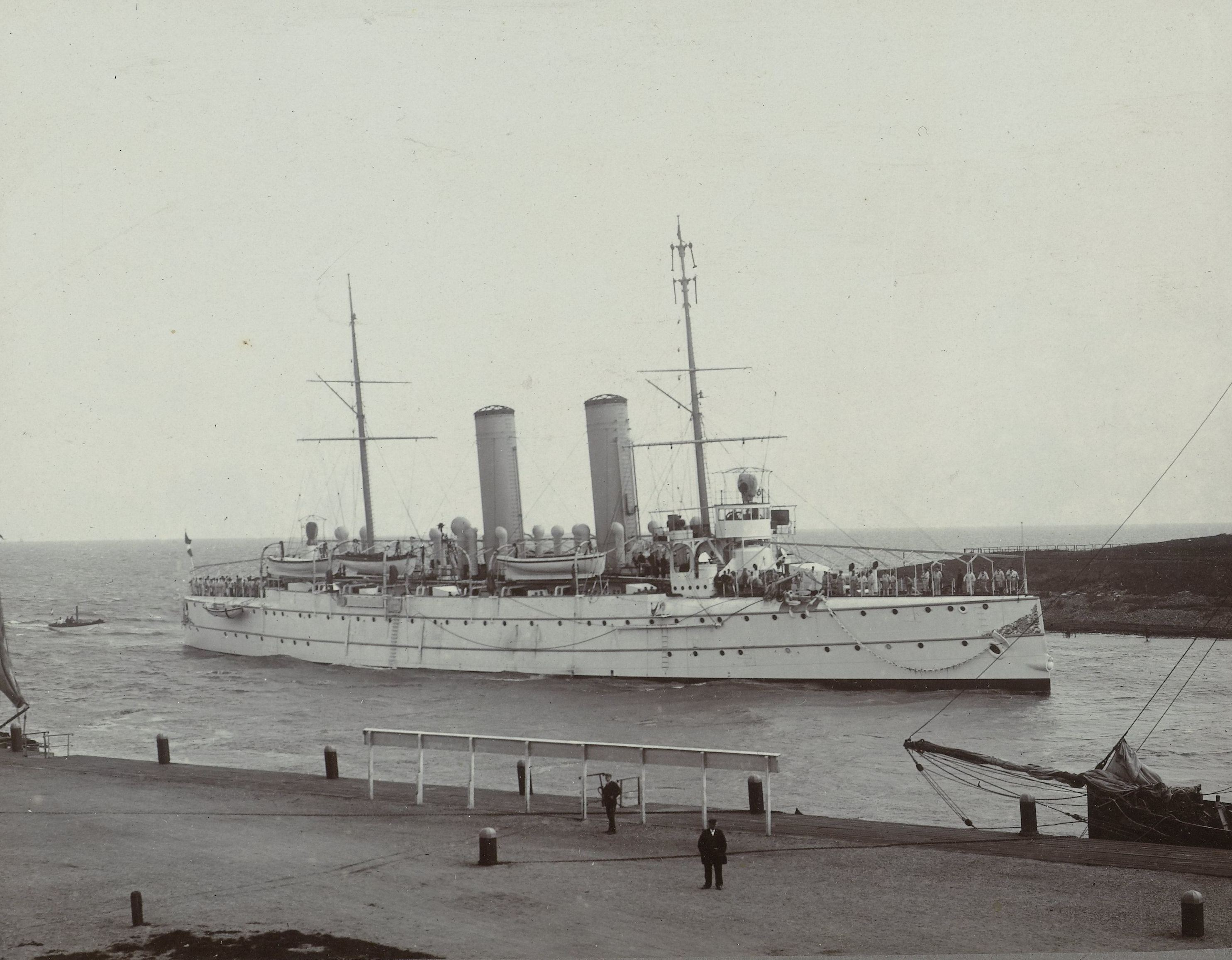
- Friesland

History

Netherlands
- Name: Friesland
- Namesake: Friesland
- Builder: Nederlandsche Stoomboot Maatschappij, Rotterdam
- Laid down: 1895
- Launched: 4 November 1896
- Commissioned: 16 January 1898
- Decommissioned: 1913
- Fate: Scrapped

General characteristics
- Class & type: Holland-class cruiser
- Displacement: 3,900 tons
- Length: 93.3 m (306 ft 1 in)
- Beam: 14.8 m (48 ft 7 in)
- Draught: 5.41 m (17 ft 9 in)
- Propulsion: 10,000 ihp (7,500 kW), two shafts
- Speed: 20 knots (37 km/h)
- Complement: 324
- Armament: 2 × 5.9 in (15 cm) (2 × 1); 6 × 4.7 in (12 cm) (6 × 1); 4 × 3 in (7.6 cm) (4 × 1); 4 × 1pdr (4 × 1); 2 × 45 cm (18 in) torpedo tubes
- Armour: 5 cm (2.0 in) deck

HNLMS Friesland (Dutch: Hr.Ms. Friesland) was a Holland-class protected cruiser of the Royal Netherlands Navy.

== Design ==
The ship was 93.3 metres (306 ft 1 in) long, had a beam of 14.8 metres (48 ft 7 in), a draught of 5.41 metres (17 ft 9 in), and had a displacement of 3,900 ton. The ship was equipped with 2 shaft reciprocating engines, which were rated at 10,000 ihp (7,500 kW) and produced a top speed of 20 knots (37 km/h). The ship had a deck armour of 2 in (5.1 cm). Two 5.9 in (15 cm) single turret guns provided the ship's main armament, and these were augmented by six single 4.7 in (12 cm) guns and four 3 in (7.6 cm) single guns. The ship had a complement of 324 men.

== Service history ==
The ship was built at the Nederlandsche Stoomboot Maatschappij in Rotterdam and launched on 4 November 1896. The ship was commissioned on 16 January 1898.

On 28 April 1899 Friesland was sent to Curaçao to safeguard Dutch neutrality because of war in the region. Later that year the ship was sent to the Dutch East Indies. Because of the Second Boer War the ship was sent from Tanjung Priok on 24 October 1899 to Lourenço Marques to protect Dutch citizens and interests in the region. On 23 August 1900 Friesland returned to the Dutch East Indies.

In 1902 the ship was sent to Colombo to pick up 10 Dutch volunteers who fought in the Boer war and were taken prisoner by the British and interned on Ceylon. This happened on the request of the local Dutch consul. On 4 July 1904 Friesland left for the Netherlands with the volunteers on board.

On 12 July 1906 the ship left the port of Den Helder for practice on the North Sea and Arctic Ocean. During the trip the ship visited the ports of Tromsø, Bergen and Kristiania. Close to Svalbard the ship assisted the grounded French passenger ship Ile de France by pulling it loose. Friesland returned to port on 27 August. On 14 July 1907 Friesland collided with the British destroyer Lee off Start Point, Devon, holing the destroyer on her port quarter.

In 1908 Friesland, Gelderland and Jacob van Heemskerck were sent to patrol the Venezuelan coast during the Second Castro crisis. Friesland guarded the entry to Maracaibo.

On 17 September 1910 the ship was present for the state visit of the Belgian king Albert I and his wife to the Netherlands. During this visit the couple visited the IJ in Amsterdam where Jacob van Heemskerck, Friesland, Piet Hein, Evertsen, O 1 and other Dutch warships were present and fired saluting shots. The pair was given a tour of Jacob van Heemskerck.

The ship was decommissioned in 1913.
