= HNLMS Kortenaer (1894) =

Dutch coastal defence ship

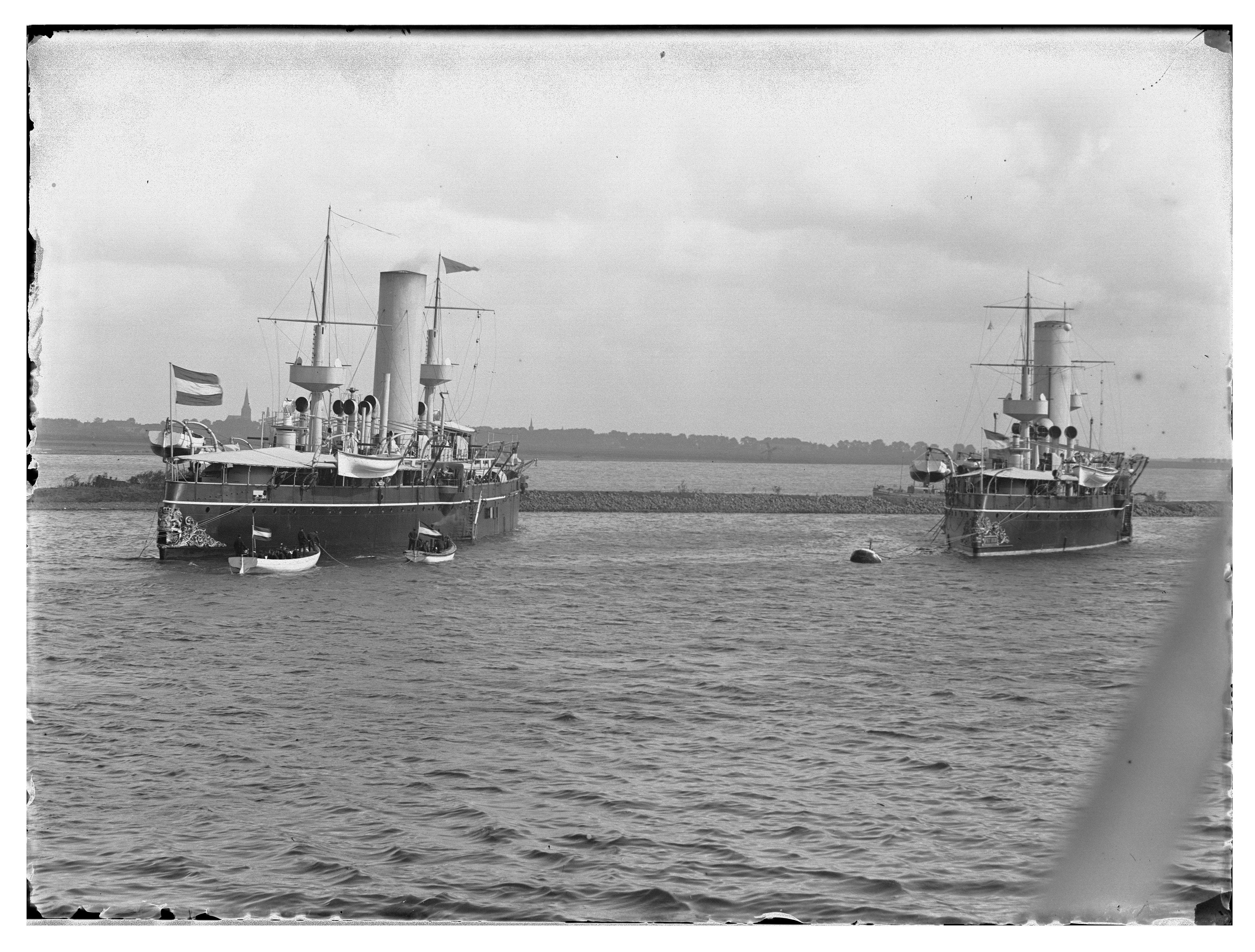
- Kortenaer with Piet Hein

History

Netherlands
- Name: Kortenaer
- Builder: Rijkswerf in Amsterdam
- Laid down: 1893
- Launched: 27 October 1894
- Commissioned: 17 December 1895
- Decommissioned: 1920
- Fate: Scrapped

General characteristics
- Class & type: Evertsen-class coastal defence ship
- Displacement: 3,464 tons
- Length: 86.2 m (282 ft 10 in)
- Beam: 14.33 m (47 ft 0 in)
- Draught: 5.23 m (17 ft 2 in)
- Propulsion: 4,700 hp (3,500 kW), two shafts
- Speed: 16 knots (30 km/h)
- Complement: 263
- Armament: 2 × 8.2 in (21 cm) (1 × 2); 1 × 8.2 in (21 cm) (1 × 1); 2 × 15 cm (5.9 in) (2 × 1); 6 × 7.5 cm (3.0 in) (6 × 1); 8 × 1pdr (8 × 1); 3 × 45 cm (18 in) torpedo tubes
- Armour: 6 in (15 cm) belt; 9.5 in (24 cm) barbette

HNLMS Kortenaer (Dutch: Hr.Ms. Kortenaer) was a Evertsen-class coastal defence ship of the Royal Netherlands Navy.

== Design ==
The ship was 86.2 metres (282 ft 10 in) long, had a beam of 14.33 metres (47 ft 0 in), a draught of 5.23 metres (17 ft 2 in), and had a displacement of 3,464 ton. The ship was equipped with 2 shaft reciprocating engines, which were rated at 4,700 ihp (3,500 kW) and produced a top speed of 16 knots (30 km/h). The ship had a belt armour of 6 in (15 cm) and 9.5 in (24 cm) barbette armour. The main armament of the ship was three 8.2 in (21 cm) guns in a double and single turret. Secondary armament included two single 15 cm (5.9 in) guns and six single 7.5 cm (3.0 in) guns.

== Service history ==
The ship was laid down in 1893 at the Rijkswerf in Amsterdam and launched on 27 October 1894. The ship was commissioned on 17 December 1895.

4 February 1896 she and her sister ship Evertsen left for practice in the Mediterranean Sea. On 11 May 1896 during the harbor strikes in Rotterdam a ban on assembly was decreed. Two days later Kortenaer patrolled the Meuse. The ship was later relieved by her sister ships Evertsen, Piet Hein and the police schooner Argus. 300 grenadiers were deployed during the strikes. The strikes were ended on 21 may.

On 30 May 1913 the ship relieved the Gelderland in Constantinople which was sent to the city on 11 November 1912 because of risen political tension and a direct war treat.

12 April 1914 the ship was sent from Curaçao to the Mexican coast to protect the complex of the Dutch petrol company La Corona in Tampico when political tension had risen between Mexico and the USA.

The ships was finally decommissioned in 1920.
