= HNLMS Kortenaer =

HNLMS Kortenaer (Dutch: Hr.Ms. or Zr.Ms. Kortenaer) may refer to following ships of the Royal Netherlands Navy:

- HNLMS Kortenaer (1894), an Evertsen-class coastal defence ship
- HNLMS Kortenaer (1927), an Admiralen-class destroyer
- HNLMS Kortenaer (1945), a British S-class destroyer previously HMS Scorpion purchased in 1945 and scrapped in 1963
- HNLMS Kortenaer (F807), a Kortenaer-class frigate
