= HNLMS Sumatra (1890) =

Small protected cruiser with a heavy main gun

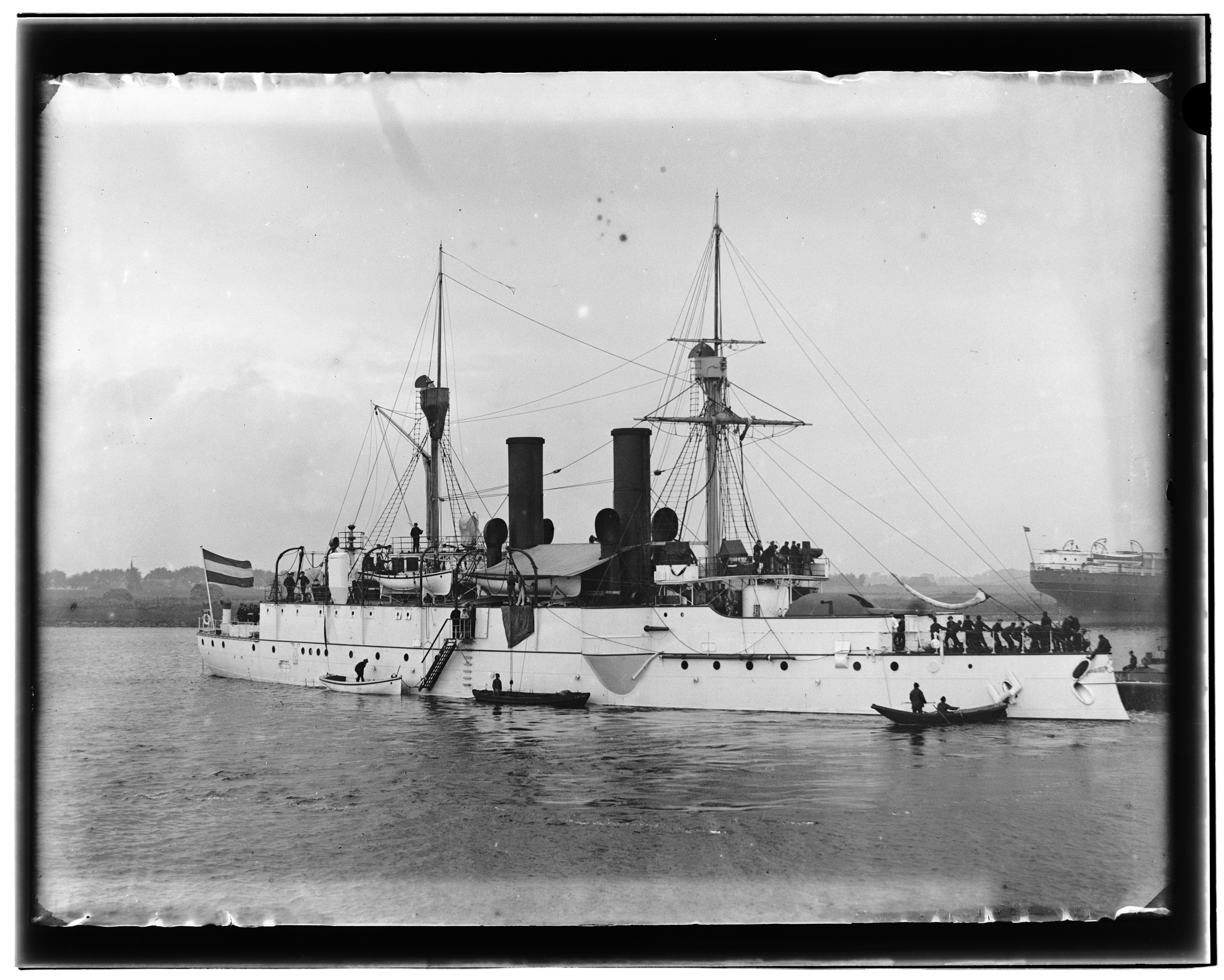

History

Netherlands
- Name: Sumatra
- Builder: Koninklijke Fabriek van Stoom- en andere Werktuigen, Amsterdam
- Launched: 1890
- Fate: Sold for scrap, 1907

General characteristics
- Type: Protected cruiser
- Displacement: 1,693 long tons (1,720 t)
- Length: 229 ft 7 in (70.0 m)
- Beam: 37 ft 1 in (11.3 m)
- Draft: 15 ft 4 in (4.7 m)
- Propulsion: 2,350 ihp (1,750 kW)
- Speed: 17 knots (31 km/h; 20 mph)
- Capacity: 207 to 276 tons of coal
- Complement: 181
- Armament: 1 × single 21 cm (8.3 in) gun; 1 × single 15 cm (5.9 in) gun; 2 × single 12 cm (4.7 in) guns; 4 × single 1 pdr (37 mm (1.5 in)) guns; 2 × 5-barreled 1 pdr (37 mm (1.5 in)) revolver cannon; 2 × 356 mm (14 in) torpedo tubes
- Armor: Deck: 1.5 in (38 mm)

HNLMS Sumatra was a small protected cruiser built for the Indies Military Navy during the 1890s for service in the Dutch East Indies. Completed in 1891, the ship was sold for scrap in 1907.

== Design and construction ==
The design resembled a smaller version of the Esmeralda concept (the 1883 protected cruiser built by Armstrong/Elswick shipyards for Chile) and is most similar in size to the Chinese protected cruiser Chi Yuan (1883) a ship built at about the same time as Esmeralda.

Sumatra had an overall length of 229 feet 7 inches (69.98 m), a beam of 37 feet 1 inch (11.30 m), and a deep draft (hull) of 15 feet 4 inches (4.67 m). She displaced 1,693 long tons (1,720 t). Her steam engine was rated at 2,350 indicated horsepower (1,750 kW), enough to give her a speed of 17 knots (31 km/h; 20 mph). The ship could carry between 207–276 long tons (210–280 t) of coal. Her crew consisted of 181 officers and enlisted men. Sumatra was protected by an armored deck 1.5 inches (38 mm) thick.

The ship's armament consisted of a single 35-caliber 21-centimeter (8.3 in) A. No. 2 (Krupp 21 cm L/35) gun forward of the superstructure and a 35-caliber 15-centimeter (5.9 in) A. No.2 (Krupp 15 cm MRK L/35) gun aft, both protected by gun shields. On each side of the hull was a sponson for single 12-centimeter (4.7 in) L.A. guns. She also mounted a pair of 356-millimeter (14 in) torpedo tubes. For defense against torpedo boats, Sumatra was equipped with four single 3.7-centimeter (1.5 in) Hotchkiss guns, two 3.7 cm Hotchkiss revolver guns, and one mr. 7.5-centimeter (3.0 in) A gun.

== Construction and career ==
Sumatra was laid down in 1889 by Koninklijke Fabriek van Stoom- en andere Werktuigen at their shipyard in Amsterdam and was intended for colonial duties. The ship was launched on 26 April 1890 and entered service on 1 May 1891. She was taken out of service on 10 May 1902 and was sold for scrap in 1907.

== See also ==
- List of cruisers of the Netherlands

== Bibliography ==
- Campbell, N. J. M. (1979). "The Netherlands". In Chesneau, Roger & Kolesnik, Eugene M. (eds.). Conway's All the World's Fighting Ships 1860–1905. New York: Mayflower Books. pp. 371–377. ISBN 0-8317-0302-4.
- "Algemeen Overzicht der Scheepen en Vaartuigen van Oorlog". Jaarboek van de Koninklijke Nederlandsche Zeemacht. Vereins deutscher Eisen- und Stahlindustrieller und der Vereins deutscher Eisenhüttenleute. 1900. pp. 69–105.
