= Kortenaer =

Kortenaer may refer to:

- Egbert Bartholomeusz Kortenaer (1604–1665), admiral of the United Provinces of the Netherlands
- HNLMS Kortenaer, for ships named after the admiral
- Kortenaer-class frigate, a class of frigates of the Royal Netherlands Navy
