= ARA Veinticinco de Mayo (1890) =

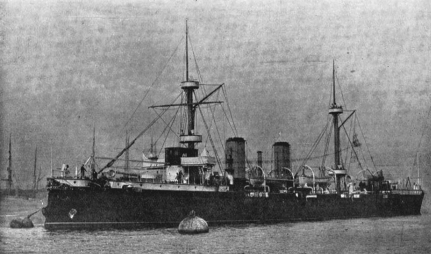
- Cruiser Veinticinco de Mayo circa 1910

History

Argentina
- Name: Veinticinco de Mayo
- Namesake: Twenty-fifth of May, the date of Argentina's May Revolution in 1810
- Builder: Armstrong, Mitchell & Co., Newcastle-on-Tyne
- Launched: 5 March 1890
- Completed: 1891
- Commissioned: 1891
- Decommissioned: 1921
- Fate: Scrapped

General characteristics
- Type: Protected cruiser
- Displacement: 3500 tons
- Length: 107.90 m (354.0 ft)
- Beam: 13.41 m (44.0 ft)
- Draft: 4.87 m (16.0 ft)
- Propulsion: 2-shaft VTE, 8,500 ihp (6,300 kW), 4 cylindrical boilers, 300 to 600 tons coal
- Speed: 21 knots (24 mph; 39 km/h)
- Range: 5025 nautical miles
- Complement: 344
- Armament: 2 × 210-millimetre (8 in) guns; 8 × 124 mm (4.9 in) QF guns; 12 × 47mm Hotchkiss guns; 12 × 37mm guns; 8 Maxim machine guns; 6 × 18 in (460 mm) torpedo tubes
- Armour: Protected deck: 25–27 mm (0.98–1.06 in); Glacis over engines: Gun shields: Conning tower: Belt: 120 mm (4.7 in)

ARA Veinticinco de Mayo was a protected cruiser that served in the Argentine Navy between 1891 and 1921.

== Design ==
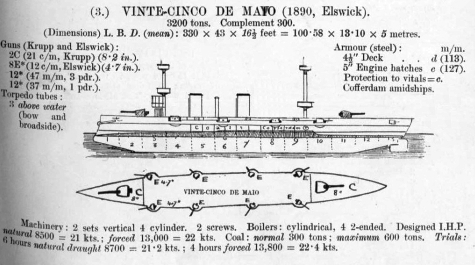
Specifications, from Jane's

Veinticinco de Mayo was a steam-powered protected cruiser similar to Piemonte built in the same shipyard for the Royal Italian Navy, but improved and larger. Its steel hull had a ram in the bow, and was protected with an armored deck.

Its main battery was two 210-millimetre (8 in) guns, one at the bow and another at the stern, and four 124 mm quick-firing guns per side. The secondary battery had twelve 47 mm and twelve 37mm quick-fire Hotchkiss guns. It had two masts, in its tops were mounted eight Maxim machine guns. It initially mounted three torpedo tubes, later increased to six. It also carried two steam boats with spar torpedoes.

== History ==
In 1890 the Argentine government led by President Miguel Ángel Juárez Celman decided to purchase a new cruiser due to the dispute with Chile concerning the application of the boundary Treaty of 1881. The Argentine representative to the United Kingdom, Dr. Luis L. Domínguez, signed a £ 260,000 (1,310,410 Gold Pesos) contract with shipyard W. Armstrong, Mitchell & Co., in Newcastle upon Tyne, England, for the construction of a 3,500-ton cruiser which would be called Necochea. Before its completion it was decided to change its name to Veinticinco de Mayo ("25th May"), the tenth Argentine Navy ship with this name, and was launched on March 5, 1890 under that name. Its first commander was Capitán de Navío Ceferino Ramirez, previously in charge of the vessel's construction.

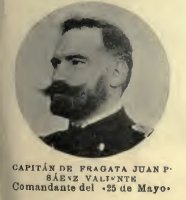
Frigate captain Sáenz Valiente

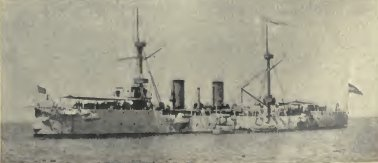
25 de Mayo in 1901

In 1901, commanded by Frigate captain (Spanish: Capitán de fragata) Juan Pablo Sáenz Valiente, the ship was deployed to Río Gallegos due to the incidents in Última Esperanza Sound, which also caused the Chilean government to deploy the cruiser Esmeralda. After that mission Veinticinco de Mayo was sent to Río Santiago in reserve, commanded by Frigate captain Enrique Thorne.

In 1910 the protected cruiser joined the 2nd Division, and participated of the Centenary of the May Revolution, after what it returned to reserve. It was reactivated during the First World War but with a low level of activity.

In the following years was gradually dismantled, and in 1921 it was used only as a coaling pontoon. In the report sent to the Argentine Congress for the period 1927/28, the ship was referred as "inexistent".

== See also ==
- List of cruisers
- List of ships of the Argentine Navy
