= HMS Lee (1899) =

Destroyer of the Royal Navy

History

United Kingdom
- Name: Lee
- Ordered: 1898 – 1899 Naval Estimates
- Builder: William Doxford and Sons Pallion, Sunderland
- Laid down: 4 January 1898
- Launched: 27 January 1899
- Commissioned: March 1901
- Fate: 5 October 1909 wrecked off Blacksod Bay on the west coast of Ireland

General characteristics
- Class & type: Doxford three funnel - 30 knot destroyer
- Displacement: 350 long tons (356 t) standard; 400 long tons (406 t) full load; 214 ft (65 m) o/a; 21 ft (6.4 m) Beam; 9 ft 7 in (2.92 m) Draught
- Propulsion: 4 × Thornycroft water tube boiler; 2 × Vertical Triple Expansion (VTE) steam engines driving 2 shafts producing 6,300 shp (4,700 kW)
- Speed: 30 kn (56 km/h)
- Range: 95 tons coal; 1,615 nmi (2,991 km) at 11 kn (20 km/h)
- Complement: 63 officers and men
- Armament: 1 × QF 12-pounder 12 cwt Mark I L/40 naval gun on a P Mark I Low angle mount; 5 × QF 6-pdr 8 cwt naval gun L/40 Naval gun on a Mark I* low angle mount; 2 × single tubes for 18-inch (450mm) torpedoes

Service record

HMS Lee was a Doxford three funnel - 30 knot destroyer ordered by the Royal Navy under the 1898 – 1899 Naval Estimates. She was the sixth ship to carry this name since its introduction in 1776 for a 6-gun sloop for service on the Great Lakes.

== Construction and career ==
She was laid down on 4 January 1898 at the William Doxford and Sons shipyard at Pallion, Sunderland and launched on 27 January 1899. During her acceptance trials she took a very long time to attain the contract speed of 30 knots and was not accepted into the Royal Navy until March 1901.

After commissioning she was deployed to the Channel Fleet and based at Shearness as part of the Medway Instructional Flotilla. In December 1901 she was replaced in the flotilla by Mermaid, her crew was transferred to the latter ship, and she paid off into the Fleet Reserve.

On 14 July 1907, Lee, which had been operating with the Channel Fleet, collided with the Dutch protected cruiser Friesland off Start Point, Devon, holing the destroyer on her port quarter.

On 5 October 1909 she was wrecked off Blacksod Bay on the west coast of Ireland.

== Pennant Numbers ==
During her career she was not assigned a pennant (pendant) number.

== Bibliography ==
- Chesneau, Roger & Kolesnik, Eugene M., eds. (1979). Conway's All The World's Fighting Ships 1860–1905. London: Conway Maritime Press. ISBN 0-85177-133-5.
- Colledge, J. J.; Warlow, Ben (2006) [1969]. Ships of the Royal Navy: The Complete Record of All Fighting Ships of the Royal Navy from the 15th Century to the Present (3rd Rev ed.). London: Chatham Publishing. ISBN 978-1-86176-281-8. OCLC 67375475.
- Dittmar, F. J. & Colledge, J. J. (1972). British Warships 1914–1919. Shepperton, UK: Ian Allan. ISBN 0-7110-0380-7.
- Friedman, Norman (2009). British Destroyers: From Earliest Days to the Second World War. Barnsley, UK: Seaforth Publishing. ISBN 978-1-84832-049-9.
- Gardiner, Robert & Gray, Randal, eds. (1985). Conway's All The World's Fighting Ships 1906–1921. London: Conway Maritime Press. ISBN 0-85177-245-5.
- Lyon, David (2001) [1996]. The First Destroyers. London: Caxton Editions. ISBN 1-84067-3648.
- Manning, T. D. (1961). The British Destroyer. London: Putnam & Co. OCLC 6470051.
- March, Edgar J. (1966). British Destroyers: A History of Development, 1892–1953; Drawn by Admiralty Permission From Official Records & Returns, Ships' Covers & Building Plans. London: Seeley Service. OCLC 164893555.
