= HNLMS Evertsen (1894) =

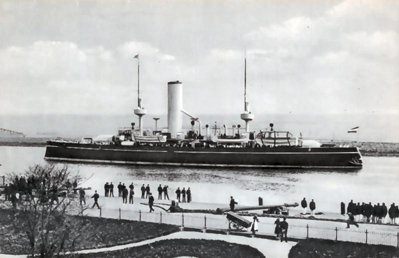
- Evertsen

History

Netherlands
- Name: Evertsen
- Builder: Koninklijke Maatschappij De Schelde
- Laid down: 1893
- Launched: 29 September 1894
- Commissioned: 1 February 1896
- Decommissioned: 1913
- Fate: Scrapped

General characteristics
- Type: Evertsen-class coastal defence ship
- Displacement: 3,464 tons
- Length: 86.2 m (282 ft 10 in)
- Beam: 14.33 m (47 ft 0 in)
- Draught: 5.23 m (17 ft 2 in)
- Propulsion: 4,700 hp (3,500 kW), two shafts
- Speed: 16 knots (30 km/h)
- Complement: 263
- Armament: 2 × 8.2 in (21 cm) (1 × 2); 1 × 8.2 in (21 cm) (1 × 1); 2 × 15 cm (5.9 in) (2 × 1); 6 × 7.5 cm (3.0 in) (6 × 1); 8 × 1pdr (8 × 1); 3 × 45 cm (18 in) torpedo tubes
- Armour: 6 in (15 cm) belt; 9.5 in (24 cm) barbette

HNLMS Evertsen (Dutch: Hr.Ms. Evertsen) was a Evertsen-class coastal defence ship of the Royal Netherlands Navy.

== Design ==
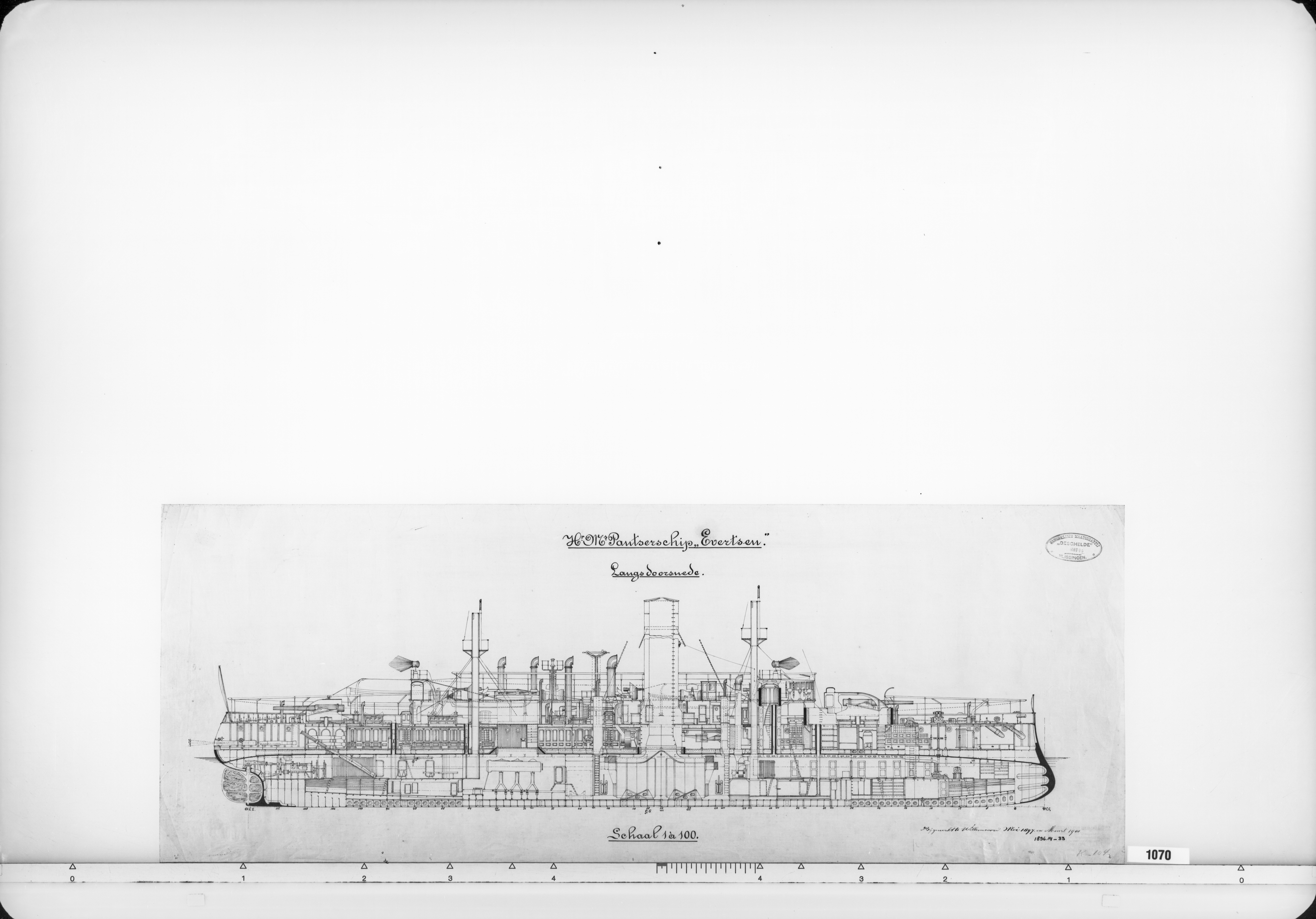
Ship plan

Evertsen was 86.2 metres (282 ft 10 in) long, her beam was 14.33 metres (47 ft 0 in), her draught was 5.23 metres (17 ft 2 in), and she displaced 3,464 tons. She had two shaft reciprocating engines, which were rated at 4,700 ihp (3,500 kW) and produced a top speed of 16 knots (30 km/h). She had 6 in (15 cm) belt armour, and 9.5 in (24 cm) barbette armour. Her main armament was three 8.2 in (21 cm) guns, in a double and single turret. Secondary armament included two single 15 cm (5.9 in) guns and six single 7.5 cm (3.0 in) guns.

== Service history ==
The ship was laid down in 1893 at the Koninklijke Maatschappij De Schelde in Flushing and launched on 29 September 1894. In March 1895, her propellers were mounted while she was in Middelburg Drydock. She was commissioned on 1 February 1896. 4 February 1896 she and her sister ship Kortenaer left for practice in the Mediterranean Sea. On 11 May 1896, during the harbor strikes in Rotterdam, a ban on assembly was decreed. Two days later, Kortenaer patrolled the Meuse. She was later relieved by her sister ships Evertsen, Piet Hein, and the police schooner Argus. 300 grenadiers were deployed during the strikes. The strikes were ended on 21 May.

On 5 May 1898, she left van Den Helder for Lisbon. She was there to celebrate the discovery of the seaway to India by Vasco da Gama four centuries earlier. The Portuguese king Carlos I and his wife visited the ship while she was there.

From 1911 to 1913, Captain lieutenant Jean Jacques Rambonnet commanded the ship. He made several voyages on the North Sea with her. The ship was decommissioned in 1913.
