= HDMS Gorm =

Monitor built for the Royal Danish Navy

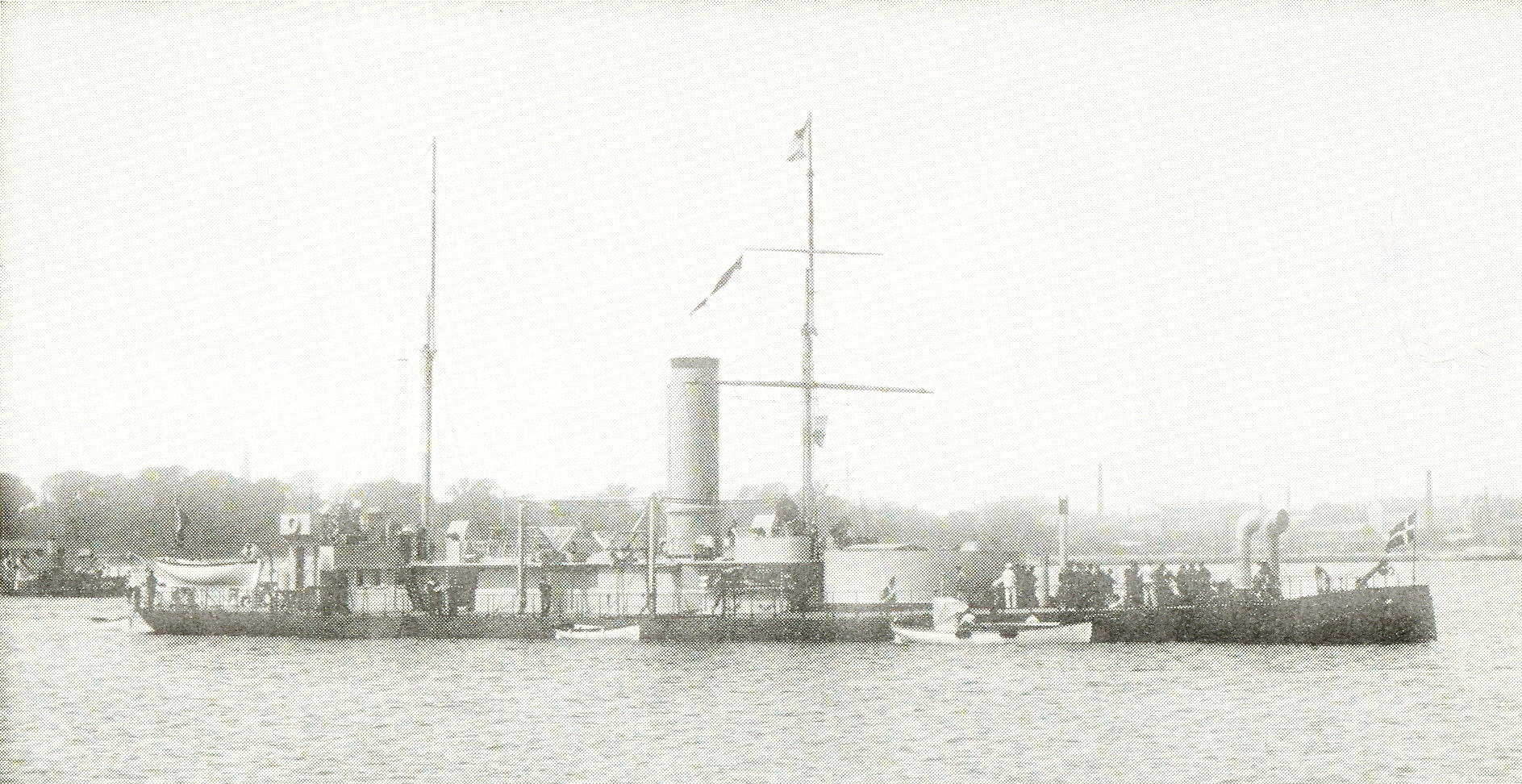
- Gorm

History

Kingdom of Denmark
- Name: Gorm
- Namesake: Gorm the Old
- Builder: Naval Dockyard, Copenhagen
- Laid down: 18 November 1867
- Launched: 17 May 1870
- Commissioned: 23 June 1871
- Decommissioned: 12 June 1912
- Fate: Scrapped, 1912 in Stettin

General characteristics (as completed)
- Type: Monitor
- Displacement: 2,313 metric tons (2,276 long tons)
- Length: 71.11 m (233 ft 4 in) (o/a)
- Beam: 12.19 m (40 ft 0 in)
- Draught: 4.37 m (14 ft 4 in)
- Installed power: 1,600 ihp (1,200 kW)
- Propulsion: 2 shafts, 2 trunk steam engines
- Speed: 12.5 knots (23.2 km/h; 14.4 mph)
- Complement: 160
- Armament: 2 × Armstrong 254 mm (10 in) rifled muzzle-loading guns
- Armour: Belt: 178 mm (7 in); Gun turrets: 203 mm (8 in)

The Danish ironclad Gorm was a monitor built for the Royal Danish Navy in the 1860s. She was scrapped in 1912.

== Description ==
The ship was 71.11 meters (233 ft 4 in) long overall with a beam of 12.19 meters (40 ft 0 in). She had a draft of 4.37 meters (14 ft 4 in) and displaced 2,313 metric tons (2,276 long tons). Her crew consisted of 150 officers and enlisted men.

Gorm had two trunk steam engines, built by John Penn and Sons, each driving one propeller shaft. The engines were rated at a total of 1,600 indicated horsepower (1,200 kW) for a designed speed of 12.5 knots (23.2 km/h; 14.4 mph). The ship carried a maximum of 113 metric tons (111 long tons; 125 short tons) of coal.

She was initially armed with two Armstrong 254-millimeter (10.0 in) rifled muzzle-loading (RML) guns mounted in a single turret. In 1875 a pair of 76-millimeter (3.0 in) RML guns were added. Four years later a pair of 87-millimeter (3.4 in) rifled breech-loading guns were also added and four more 87-millimeter guns were added in 1889. Two years later a pair of quick-firing (QF) 57-millimeter (2.2 in) Hotchkiss guns were added. The 254-millimeter guns were ultimately replaced by a pair of QF 150-millimeter (5.9 in) guns.

The ship had a complete waterline armored belt that was 178 millimeters (7 in) thick. The gun turret was protected by 203-millimeter (8 in) armor plates.

== Construction and career ==
Gorm was named for Gorm the Old, first historically recognized King of Denmark, was laid down by the Naval Dockyard in Copenhagen on 18 November 1867, launched on 17 May 1870 and completed on 23 June. She was stricken from the Navy List on 12 June 1912 and sold for scrap. The ship was broken up at Stettin, Germany.
