= Koningin Regentes-class coastal defense ship =

Class of coastal defence ships of the Royal Netherlands Navy

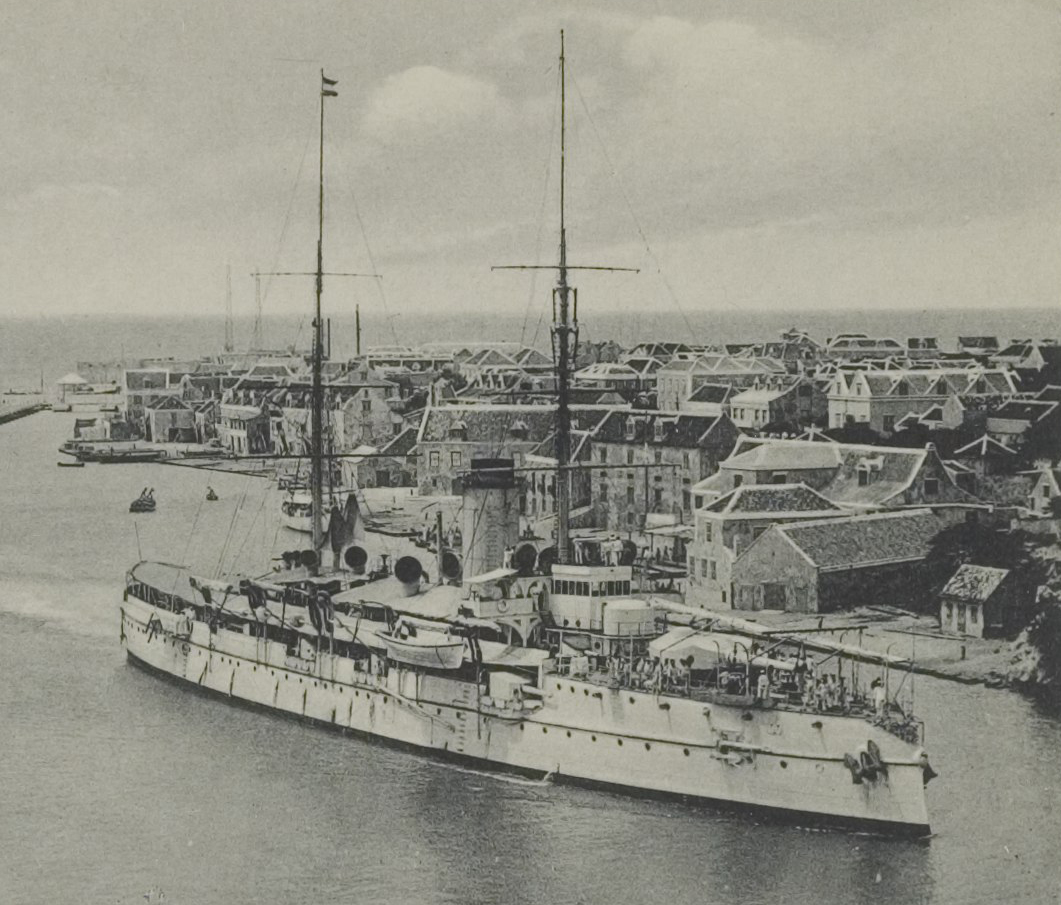
- De Ruyter

Class overview
- Name: Koningin Regentes class
- Builders: Rijkswerf (2), Maatschappij voor Scheeps- en Werktuigbouw Fijenoord
- Operators: Royal Netherlands Navy
- Preceded by: Evertsen class
- Succeeded by: Marten Harpertzoon Tromp
- Built: 1898–1904
- In service: 1902-1968
- Completed: 3
- Retired: 3

General characteristics
- Type: Coastal defence ship
- Displacement: 5,002 tons
- Length: 96.62 m (317 ft 0 in)
- Beam: 15.19 m (49 ft 10 in)
- Draught: 5.82 m (19 ft 1 in)
- Propulsion: 6,500 hp (4,800 kW), two shafts
- Speed: 16.5 knots (30.6 km/h)
- Range: 2,800 nmi (5,200 km) at 9 kn (17 km/h; 10 mph)
- Capacity: 722-736 tons of coal storage
- Complement: 340
- Armament: 2 × 9.4 in (24 cm) (2 × 1); 4 × 15 cm (5.9 in) (4 × 1); 8 × 7.5 cm (3.0 in) (8 × 1); 4 × 1-pounder (4 × 1); 3 × 45 cm (18 in) torpedo tubes
- Armour: 6 in (15 cm) belt; 10 in (25 cm) barbette; 10 in (25 cm) turret; 2 in (5.1 cm) deck

The Koningin Regentes class was a class of coastal defence ships (Note: In the Dutch navy the ships were classified as "pantserschepen" literally translated: armored ships.) of the Royal Netherlands Navy. The class comprised Koningin Regentes, De Ruyter and Hertog Hendrik.

== Design ==
The ships of the class were 96.62 metres (317 ft 0 in) long, had a beam of 15.19 metres (49 ft 10 in), a draught of 5.82 metres (19 ft 1 in), and had a displacement of 5,002 ton. The ships were equipped with 2 shaft reciprocating engines, which were rated at 6,500 ihp (4,800 kW) and produced a top speed of 16.5 knots (30.6 km/h). In addition, the machinery had two sets of triple expansions.

=== Armor ===
When it came to naval armour all three ships were equipped with Krupp armour. The ships had belt armour of 6 in (15 cm), 10 in (25 cm) barbette armour and 10 in (25 cm) turret armour. Deck armour of the Koningin Regentes class was 2 in (5.1 cm).

A small improvement over the preceding Evertsen class was that the 15 cm guns were now also protected by decent shields, instead of having only 12 mm armor protection. However, it still had some minor deficiencies when compared to similar coastal defense ships at the time, such as the ships of the Monarch class. For instance, the protection of the conning tower of Koningin Regentes class did not fully extend to the deck armour. In addition, its belt armour was considered too thin.

=== Armament ===
The artillery of the Koningin Regentes class was a big step forward in comparison with the smaller Evertsen class. The main and secondary battery were now all L/40 long quick firing guns. Some applauded the minister for this choice of armament.

The main armament of the ships were two 24 cm SK L/40 guns in single turrets. In fact, the German Navy used the same gun as main armament on their newest battleships of the Kaiser Friedrich III class. The quick fire capability of this gun meant that it fired about three rounds a minute. This made the difference with the 21 cm guns of the Evertsens even greater.

Secondary armament included four single 15 cm (5.9 in) guns This was also an improvement over the two 15 cm quick-firing guns of the Evertsens, which were also shorter. There were eight 7.5 cm (3.0 in) No. 3 single guns.The ships had three 45 cm (18 in) torpedo tubes of which two were submerged and one was above water at the bow.

== Ships ==
Construction data
Name	Laid down	Launched	Commissioned	Decommissioned	Shipyard
Koningin Regentes	1898	24 April 1900	3 January 1902	1920	Rijkswerf, Amsterdam
De Ruyter	1900	28 September 1901	29 October 1902	1923	Maatschappij voor Scheeps- en Werktuigbouw Fijenoord, Rotterdam
Hertog Hendrik	8 March 1901	7 June 1902	5 January 1904	27 September 1968	Rijkswerf , Amsterdam
