= Evertsen-class coastal defence ship =

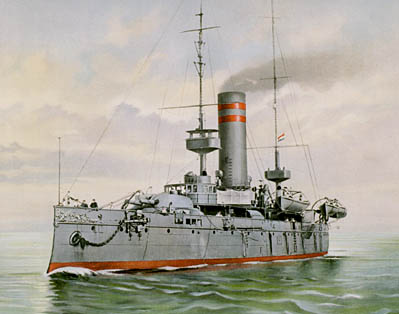
- HNLMS Evertsen at sea.

Class overview
- Name: Evertsen class
- Builders: Rijkswerf, Amsterdam; Koninklijke Maatschappij De Schelde, Flushing; Nederlandsche Stoomboot Maatschappij, Rotterdam
- Operators: Royal Netherlands Navy
- Preceded by: HNLMS Koningin Wilhelmina der Nederlanden
- Succeeded by: Koningin Regentes class
- Built: 1893-1896
- In service: 1895-1920
- Completed: 3
- Retired: 3

General characteristics
- Type: Coastal defense ship
- Displacement: 3,464 tons
- Length: 86.2 m (282 ft 10 in)
- Beam: 14.33 m (47 ft 0 in)
- Draught: 5.23 m (17 ft 2 in)
- Propulsion: 4,700 hp (3,500 kW), two shafts
- Speed: 16 knots (30 km/h)
- Capacity: 289 tons of coal storage
- Complement: 263
- Armament: 2 × 8.2 in (21 cm) (1 × 2); 1 × 8.2 in (21 cm) (1 × 1); 2 × 15 cm (5.9 in) (2 × 1); 6 × 7.5 cm (3.0 in) (6 × 1); 8 × 1-pounder (8 × 1); 3 × 45 cm (18 in) torpedo tubes
- Armour: 6 in (15 cm) belt; 9.5 in (24 cm) barbette; 9.5 in (24 cm) turret; 2.25 in (5.7 cm) deck

The Evertsen class or Kortenaer class was a class of coastal defense ships (Note: In the Dutch navy the ships were classified as "pantserschepen" literally translated: armored ships.) of the Royal Netherlands Navy. The class comprised Evertsen, Piet Hein and Kortenaer.

== History ==
The protection of the Dutch East Indies came into the spotlight at the end of the nineteenth century. Many countries began expanding their battle fleets. In 1887, two medium-sized Chinese battleships became operational and were considered superior to the Dutch defence. This led to a reassessment of the defence of the Dutch East Indies. In April 1892, the foundations for modernisation were formulated by a committee consisting of three officers J.H. Kromhout, F.J. Haver Droeze and G. Kruys.

Naval expert, rear admiral and Chief of the Naval Staff Gerhardus Kruys advocated for a squadron of artillery ships. The recommendations were adopted by the government, which led to the construction of HNLMS Evertsen, HNLMS Kortenaer, and HNLMS Piet Hein. Ultimately, only the Piet Hein was sent to the Indies from 1899 to 1901, because the financing of the ships was dependant on their suitability for coastal defence of the Netherlands and the Dutch Caribbean.

== Design ==
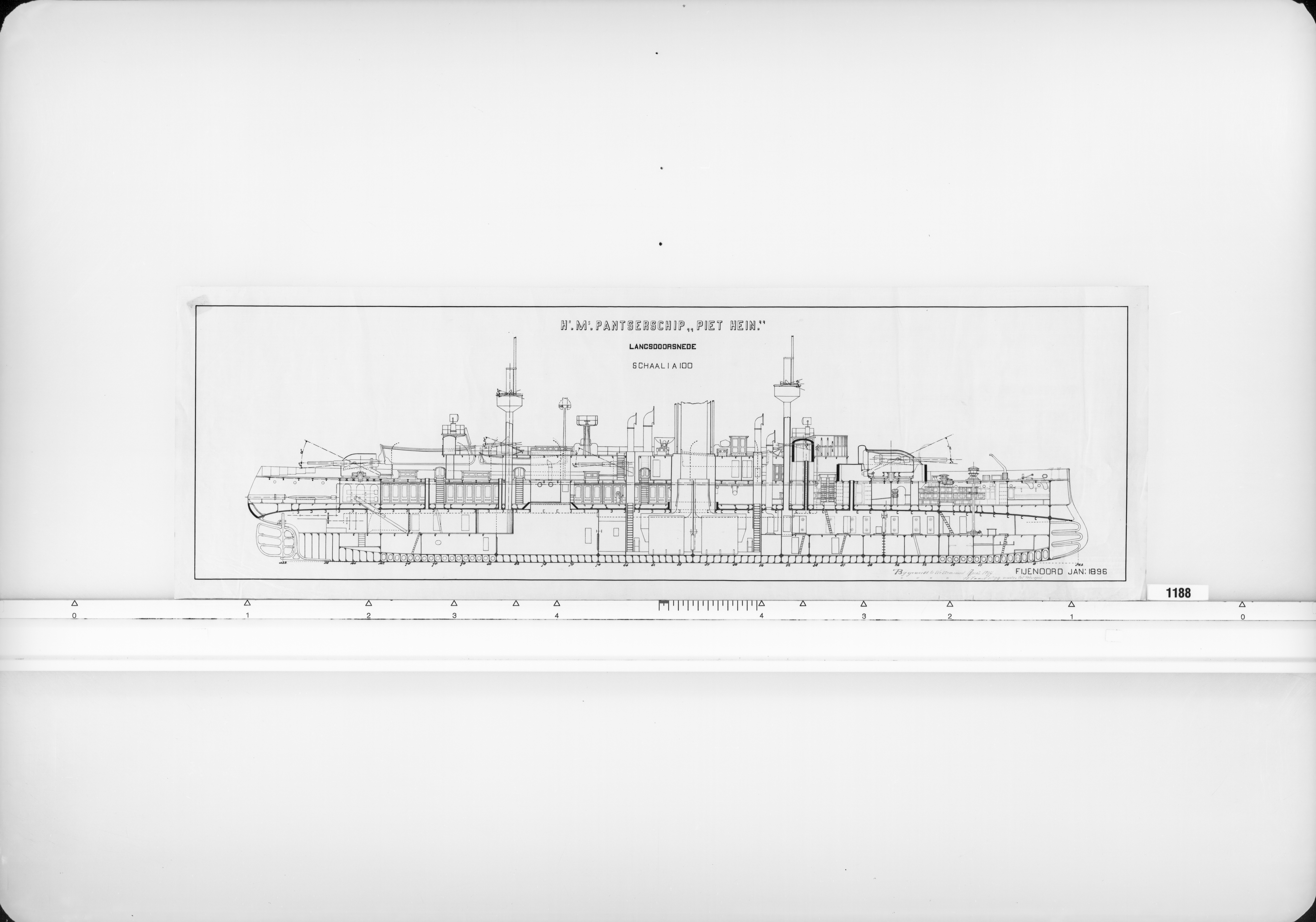
Piet Hein plan

The ships of the class were 86.2 metres (282 ft 10 in) long, had a beam of 14.33 metres (47 ft 0 in), a draught of 5.23 metres (17 ft 2 in), and had a displacement of 3,464 ton. The ships were equipped with 2 shaft reciprocating engines, which were rated at 4,700 ihp (3,500 kW) and produced a top speed of 16 knots (30 km/h). In addition, the machinery had two sets of triple expansions.

When it came to naval armour all three ships were equipped with Harvey armour. The ships had belt armour of 6 in (15 cm), 9.5 in (24 cm) barbette armour and 9.5 in (24 cm) turret armour. Deck armour of the Evertsen class was 2.25 in (5.7 cm).

=== Armament ===
The main armament of the ships consisted of three 21 cm A No. 1 guns. Two of these were placed in a Barbette on the bow. The third was behind a shield on the stern. These were second hand guns re-used to economize, while the newer 21 cm A No. 2 gun used on HNLMS Koningin Wilhelmina der Nederlanden was already available. This led to sharp criticism. The 21 cm A No. 1 gun was a 21 cm L/35 Krupp gun first built in 1882. The 9 guns required were taken from 9 gunboats instead of buying 9 new 21 cm A No. 2 guns. The 21 cm A No. 2 was a newer model of the Krupp gun, had the same length (L/35) and was only 700 kg heavier, but had about 10% more penetrative power at 2,000 m.

Secondary armament included two single 15 cm (5.9 in) guns and six single 7.5 cm (3.0 in) guns. Furthermore, it had three 45 cm (18 in) torpedo tubes.

== Ships ==
Construction data
| Name | Laid down | Launched | Commissioned | Decommissioned | Shipyard |
|---|---|---|---|---|---|
| Kortenaer | 1893 | 27 October 1894 | 17 December 1895 | 1920 | Rijkswerf, Amsterdam |
| Evertsen | 1893 | 29 September 1894 | 1 February 1896 | 1913 | Koninklijke Maatschappij De Schelde, Flushing |
| Piet Hein | 1893 | 16 August 1894 | 3 January 1896 | 1914 | Nederlandsche Stoomboot Maatschappij, Rotterdam |
