= HNLMS Koningin Wilhelmina der Nederlanden =

Protected cruiser of the Royal Netherlands Navy

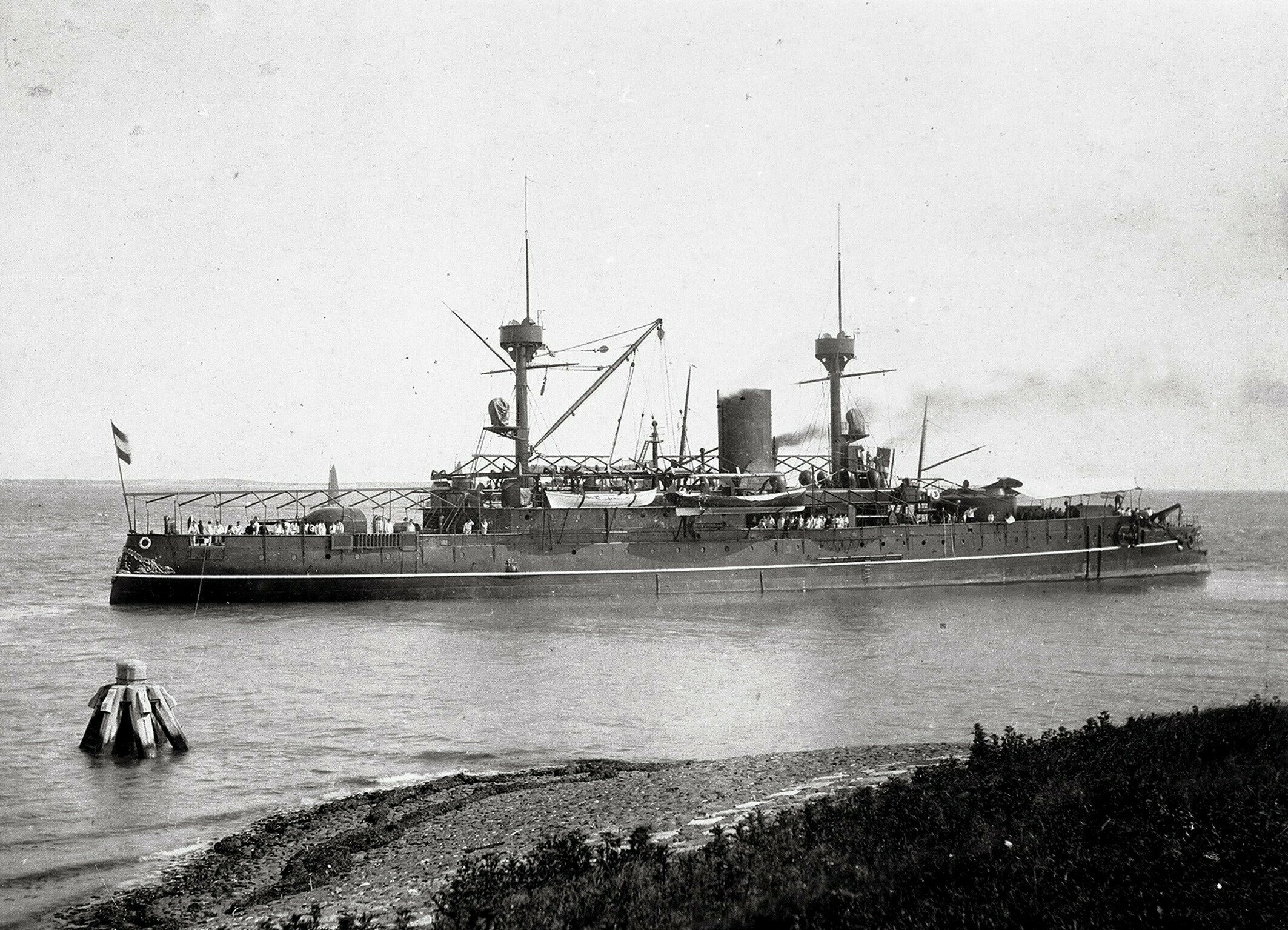
- Koningin Wilhelmina der Nederlanden in 1894

History

Netherlands
- Name: Koningin Wilhelmina der Nederlanden
- Builder: Rijkswerf, Amsterdam
- Laid down: 1891
- Launched: 22 October 1892
- Commissioned: 17 April 1894
- Decommissioned: 5 March 1910
- Fate: Scrapped in 1910

General characteristics
- Class & type: Unique protected cruiser
- Displacement: 4,530 tons
- Length: 99.8 m (327 ft 5 in)
- Beam: 14.91 m (48 ft 11 in)
- Draught: 6.07 m (19 ft 11 in)
- Propulsion: 4,600 ihp (3,400 kW)
- Speed: 15.8 knots (29.3 km/h)
- Complement: 296
- Armament: 1 × 11 in (28 cm) guns; 1 × 8.2 in (21 cm) guns; 2 × single 6.7 in (17 cm) guns; 4 × single3 in (7.6 cm) guns; 6 × single 1 pdr (0.45 kg) guns; 4 × 14 in (36 cm) torpedo tubes
- Armour: 5 cm (2.0 in) deck

HNLMS Koningin Wilhelmina der Nederlanden (Dutch: Hr.Ms. Koningin Wilhelmina der Nederlanden) was a unique protected cruiser (Note: In the Dutch navy the ship was classified as "pantserdekschip" literally translated: armoured deck ship.) of the Royal Netherlands Navy built by the Rijkswerf in Amsterdam.

== Design ==
The ship was 99.8 metres (327 ft 5 in) long, had a beam of 14.91 metres (48 ft 11 in), a draught of 6.07 metres (19 ft 11 in), and had a displacement of 4,530 tons. The ship had engines rated at 4,600 ihp (3,400 kW) which produced a top speed of 15.8 knots (29.3 km/h). It had 5 cm (2.0 in) deck armour.

The ship's main armament consisted of a single 28 cm A No. 2 gun (11 in L/30). Secondary armament was a single 21 cm A No. 2 gun (8.2 in L/35) and two single 17 cm A No. 2 guns (6.7 in L/35).

== Service history ==
The ship was built at the Rijkswerf in Amsterdam and named after Queen Wilhelmina of the Netherlands, who attended the launch ceremony and christened the ship on 22 October 1892. After the liquidation of the original builder, the Koninklijke Fabriek van Stoom- en andere Werktuigen in Amsterdam, construction of the ship was taken over by the Rijkswerf.

She entered service on 17 April 1894. From 14 July to 2 August she carried out see trials in the North Sea and Atlantic Ocean. During these trials she ran aground near Fort Harssens on 19 July while leaving the harbor of Den Helder, due to a broken steam engine. Before the ship left for the Dutch East Indies, Queen Wilhelmina and her mother visited the ship on 12 September 1894.

On 10 December 1896 she left for a journey from Batavia to China, Korea, Japan and the Philippines to show the flag.

In 1900 the ship together with the coastal defence ship Piet Hein and the protected cruiser Holland was sent to Shanghai to safeguard European citizens and Dutch interests in the region during the Boxer Rebellion. A landing party from the cruiser Holland assisted in the defense of the Shanghai French Concession where many Dutch citizens where present. Koningin Wilhelmina der Nederlanden and Holland returned to the Dutch East Indies on 9 October. On this journey they visited Amoy and Swatow. They arrived in Tanjung Priok on 6 November.

The ship started its last journey on 29 December 1909 from Sabang to IJmuiden, where she arrived on 14 February 1910. Later that year, on 5 March, she was decommissioned and on 14 October was sold to Frank Rijsdijk's Scheepssloperij for scrapping at Hendrik-Ido-Ambacht.

== See also ==
- List of cruisers of the Netherlands
