= HNLMS Piet Hein (1894) =

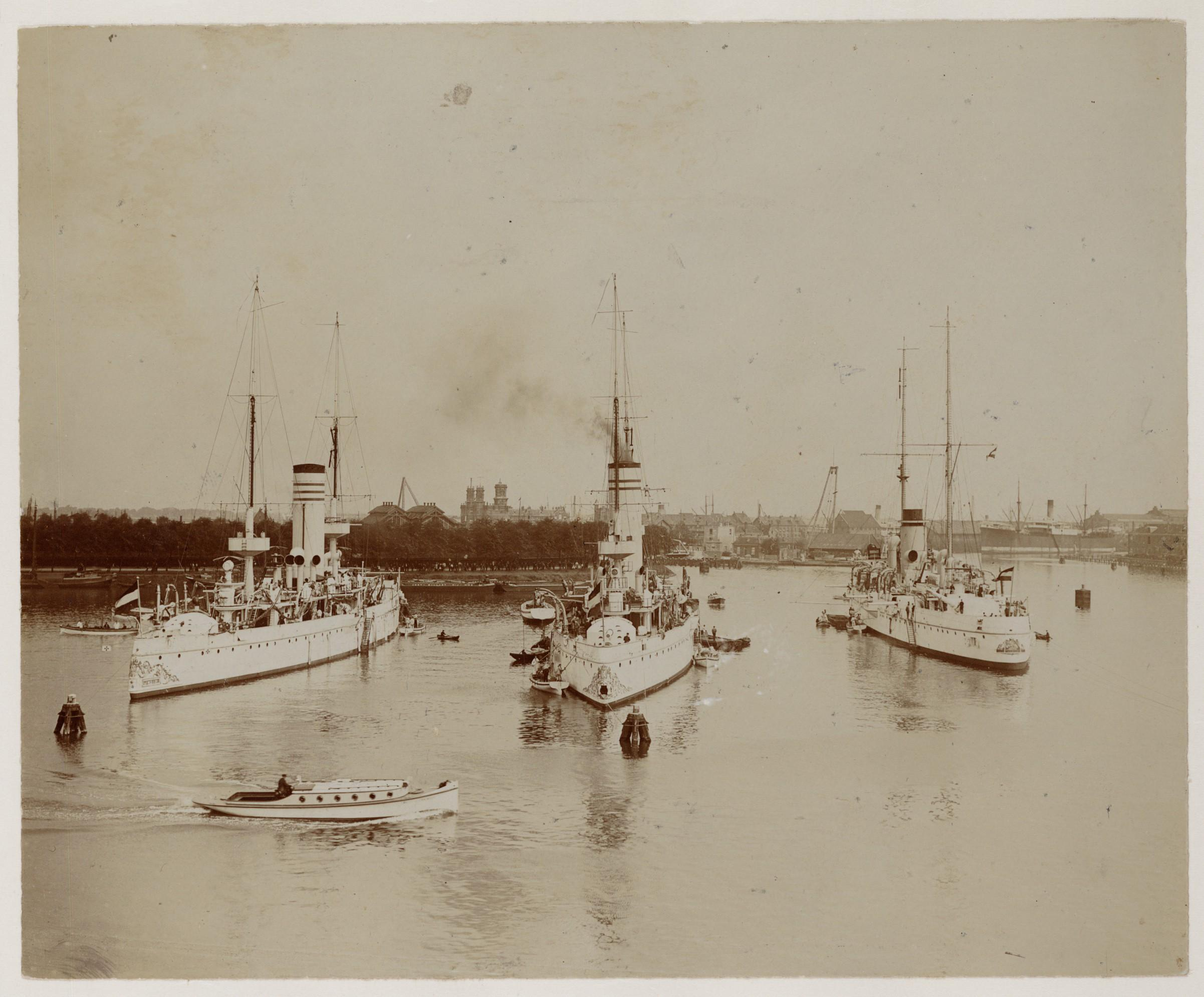
- Piet Hein with Evertsen and Jacob van Heemskerck

History

Netherlands
- Name: Piet Hein
- Builder: Nederlandsche Stoomboot Maatschappij, Rotterdam
- Laid down: 1893
- Launched: 16 August 1894
- Commissioned: 3 January 1896
- Decommissioned: 1914
- Fate: Scrapped

General characteristics
- Type: Evertsen-class coastal defence ship
- Displacement: 3,464 tons
- Length: 86.2 m (282 ft 10 in)
- Beam: 14.33 m (47 ft 0 in)
- Draught: 5.23 m (17 ft 2 in)
- Propulsion: 4,700 hp (3,500 kW), two shafts
- Speed: 16 knots (30 km/h)
- Complement: 263
- Armament: 2 × 8.2 in (21 cm) (1 × 2); 1 × 8.2 in (21 cm) (1 × 1); 2 × 15 cm (5.9 in) (2 × 1); 6 × 7.5 cm (3.0 in) (6 × 1); 8 × 1pdr (8 × 1); 3 × 45 cm (18 in) torpedo tubes
- Armour: 6 in (15 cm) belt; 9.5 in (24 cm) barbette

HNLMS Piet Hein (Dutch: Hr.Ms. Piet Hein) was a Evertsen-class coastal defence ship of the Royal Netherlands Navy.

== Design ==
The ship was 86.2 metres (282 ft 10 in) long, had a beam of 14.33 metres (47 ft 0 in), a draught of 5.23 metres (17 ft 2 in), and had a displacement of 3,464 ton. The ship was equipped with 2 shaft reciprocating engines, which were rated at 4,700 ihp (3,500 kW) and produced a top speed of 16 knots (30 km/h). The ship had a belt armour of 6 in (15 cm) and 9.5 in (24 cm) barbette armour. The main armament of the ship was three 8.2 in (21 cm) guns in a double and single turret. Secondary armament included two single 15 cm (5.9 in) guns and six single 7.5 cm (3.0 in) guns.

== Service history ==
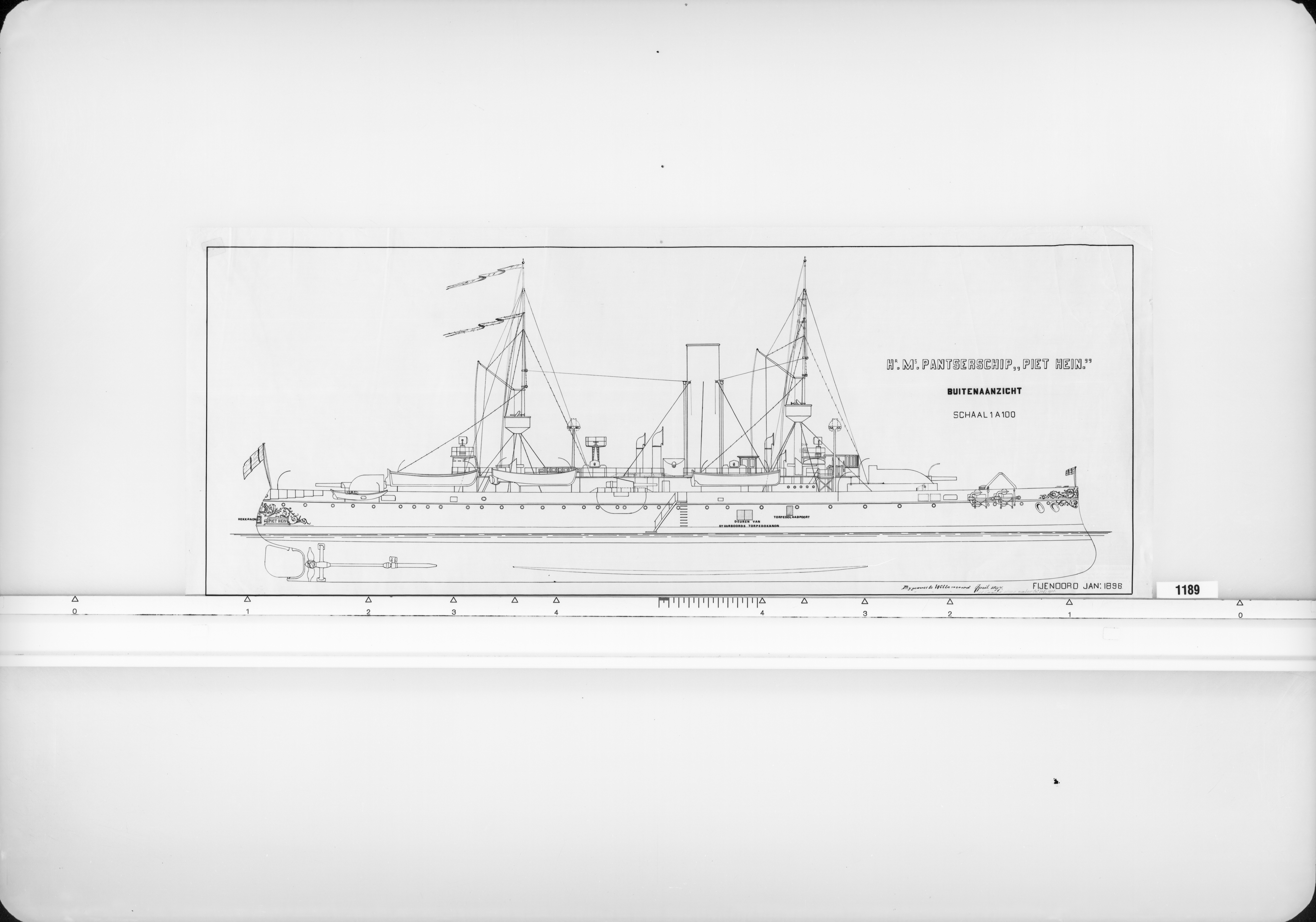
Ship plan

Towards the end of the nineteenth century Naval expert and Chief of the Navy Staff Gerhardus Kruys advocated for a squadron of artillery ships to better defend the Dutch East Indies, in response to international expansion of battle fleets. Subsequently the Dutch Government approved the construction of the Evertsen class of armoured ships. The Piet Hein was the only ship of the class sent to the Indies.

The ship was laid down in 1893 at the Nederlandsche Stoomboot Maatschappij in Rotterdam and launched on 16 August 1894. The ship was commissioned on 3 January 1896.

In 1900 the Piet Hein, joined by the Holland and the Koningin Wilhelmina der Nederlanden, was sent to Shanghai to saveguard European citizens and Dutch interests in the region during the Boxer Rebellion. Piet Hein returned in February 1901 to Soerabaja in the Dutch East Indies.

The ship was decommissioned in 1914.
