= 15 cm SK L/35 =

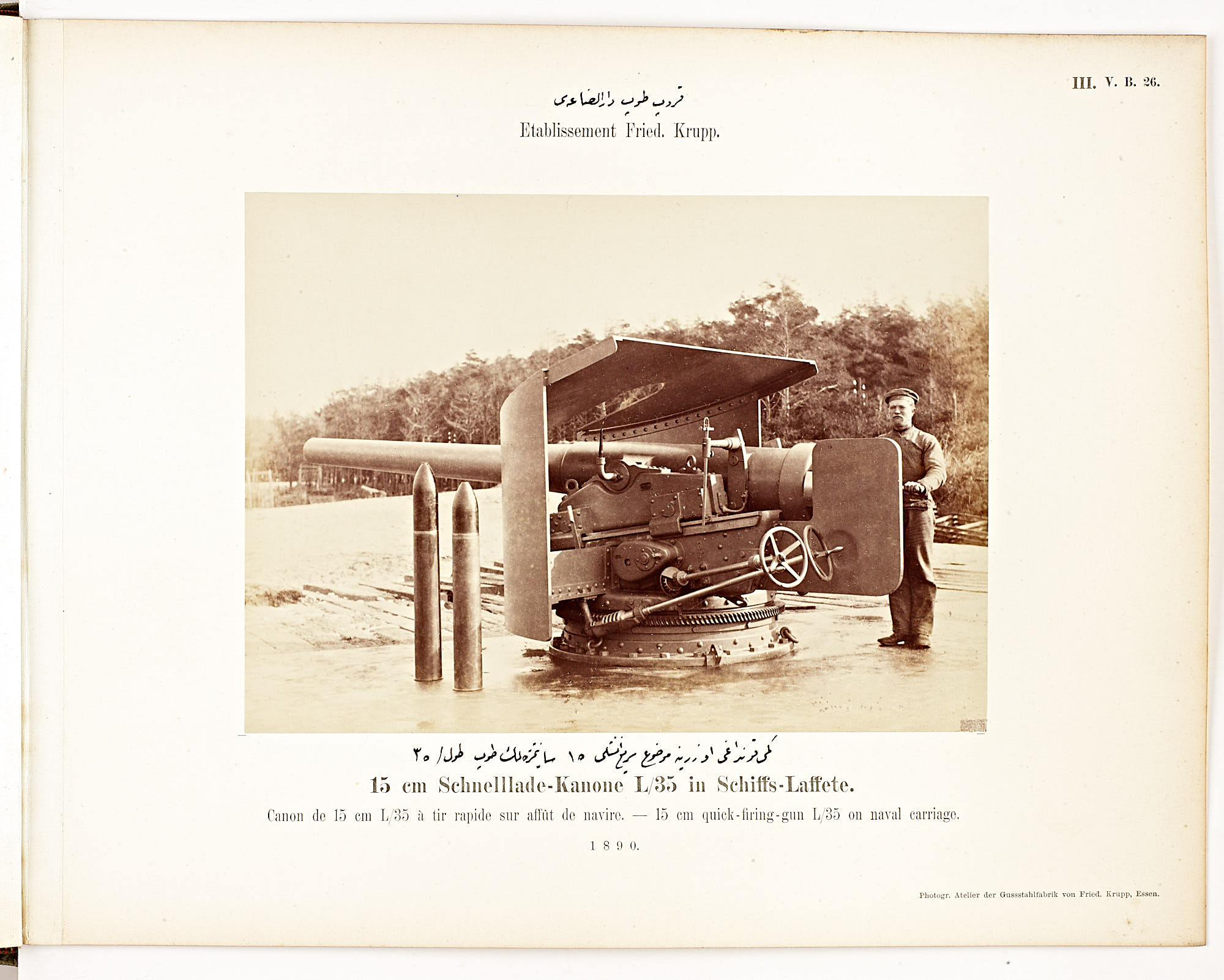
- 15 cm SK L/35 on ship carriage in 1890
- Type: Naval gun

Service history
- In service: 1892-1923
- Used by: German Empire; Austria-Hungary; China; Denmark; Japan; The Netherlands; The Ottoman Empire; Romania; Spain
- Wars: First Sino-Japanese War; Spanish–American War; Boxer Rebellion; Russo-Japanese War; World War I

Production history
- Designer: Krupp
- Designed: 1889?
- Manufacturer: Krupp
- Produced: 1890?
- Variants: Coastal Artillery; Field Gun

Specifications
- Mass: 3,888 kg
- Length: 5.22 m (17 ft 2 in) L/35
- Shell: Separate loading cased charge and projectile
- Shell weight: 45.6 kg (101 lb)
- Caliber: 149.1 mm (5.87 in)
- Breech: Horizontal sliding breech block
- Elevation: -7° to +20°
- Rate of fire: 6 rpm
- Muzzle velocity: 620 m/s (2,000 ft/s); 656 m/s (2,150 ft/s)
- Maximum firing range: 10 km (6.2 mi) at +19°

The 15 cm Schnelladekanone Länge 35, abbreviated as 15 cm SK L/35, was a German naval gun developed in the years before World War I. 'Schnelladekanone' is German for Quick-firing gun, and this is considered to be an early gun of this type. The 15 cm SK L/35 armed a variety of warships from different nations. The navies of Austria-Hungary, China, Denmark, Japan, The Netherlands, The Ottoman Empire, and Romania all used this gun.

== History ==
=== The preceding long 15 cm guns ===
From 1878 to 1882 Krupp designed and tested the 15 cm MRK L/30 and 15 cm MRK L/35. These were rifled breech loader built-up guns (Mantel Ring Kanone) that showed innovations like copper driving bands, a rifled chamber, slower burning gunpowder, longer barrels (L/35), and longer projectiles (L/4). While most of these innovations were first applied to the 15 cm caliber gun, they were later also applied to other calibers. This resulted in the Construction C/80. The 15 cm MRK C/80 guns were not quick-firing guns.

Krupp had made the first 15 cm MRK L/35 in 1883. The L/35 and the shorter L/30 were used to arm protected cruisers, turret ships and coastal defense ships under construction in the 1880s. It was also used to rearm a number of earlier iron clad warships.

=== Towards Quick-firing guns ===
The 15 cm SK L/35 was an early type of quick-firing gun. For quick-firing, several features were required:

- Breech-loading with a breech mechanism that allows rapid reloading.
- Cased ammunition, i.e. the charge is in a cartridge instead of in loose bags.
- A recoil buffer to limit recoil, so the barrel can quickly return to the same position after firing.
- The use of smokeless powder – nitrocellulose, nitroglycerine, or cordite – which create far less smoke than gunpowder, meaning that gun crews could still see their target after firing.

== Development ==
=== The 15 cm SK L/35 C/80 ===
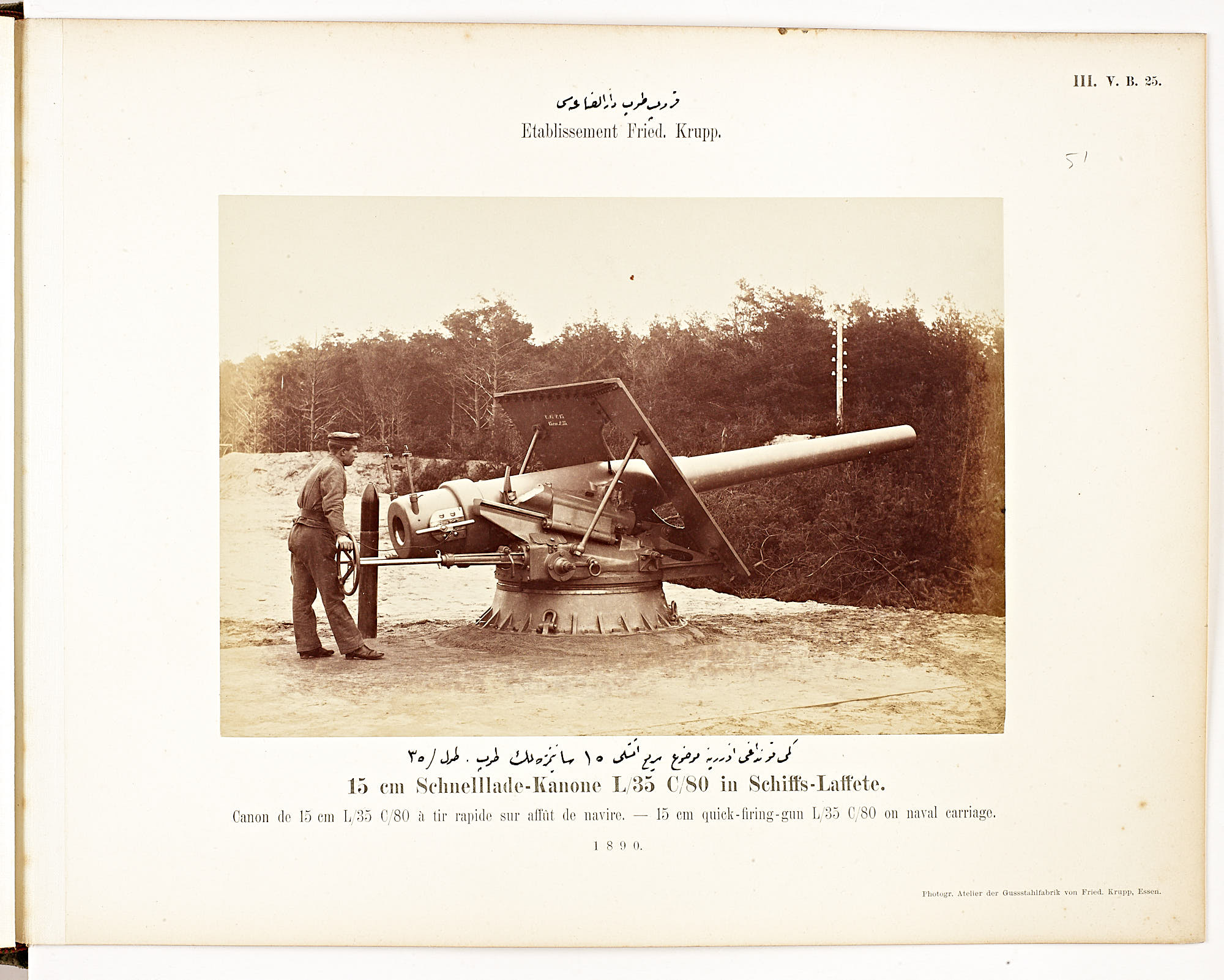
15 cm SK L/35 C/80

In 1888, Krupp started its first test with heavy caliber quick-firing guns. In 1889, these tests continued with 35 caliber long guns of 10.5, 12, 13, and 15 cm. In 1890, these continued and a 12 cm SK L/40 and the 15 cm SK L/35 Nr.6 were added.

By comparing the published photographs, it becomes clear that the 15 cm SK L/35 tested in 1889, was really an adapted gun called 15 cm SK L/35 C/80, see photo. It was a 15 cm MRK L/35 which had been given the inner configuration of a quick-firing gun. This was not always clear.

The 15 cm SK L/35 C/80 had a caliber of 149.1 mm. It was 5,220 mm long with a length of bore of 3,906 mm. It had 44 grooves with a final twist angle of 7° 10'. The barrel weighed much more than the later gun: 4,770 kg including a heavier breech block of 183 kg.

The weight of the naval carriage of the 15 cm SK L/35 C/80 was 3,696 kg. Its shield weighed 830 kg. Firing height was 1.092 mm

== Characteristics ==
=== The gun ===
The barrel had a caliber of 149.10 mm. It was 5,220 mm long with a length of bore of 3,906 mm. It had 44 grooves with a final twist angle of 7° 10'. The barrel weighed 3,888 kg including the breech block of 172 kg.

This data relates to the 15 cm Schnelladekanone L/35 Nr. 6 in Mittelpivotlafette. Which it the exact gun depicted on the photo '15 cm SK L/35 on ship carriage in 1890'.

=== Mount / carriage ===
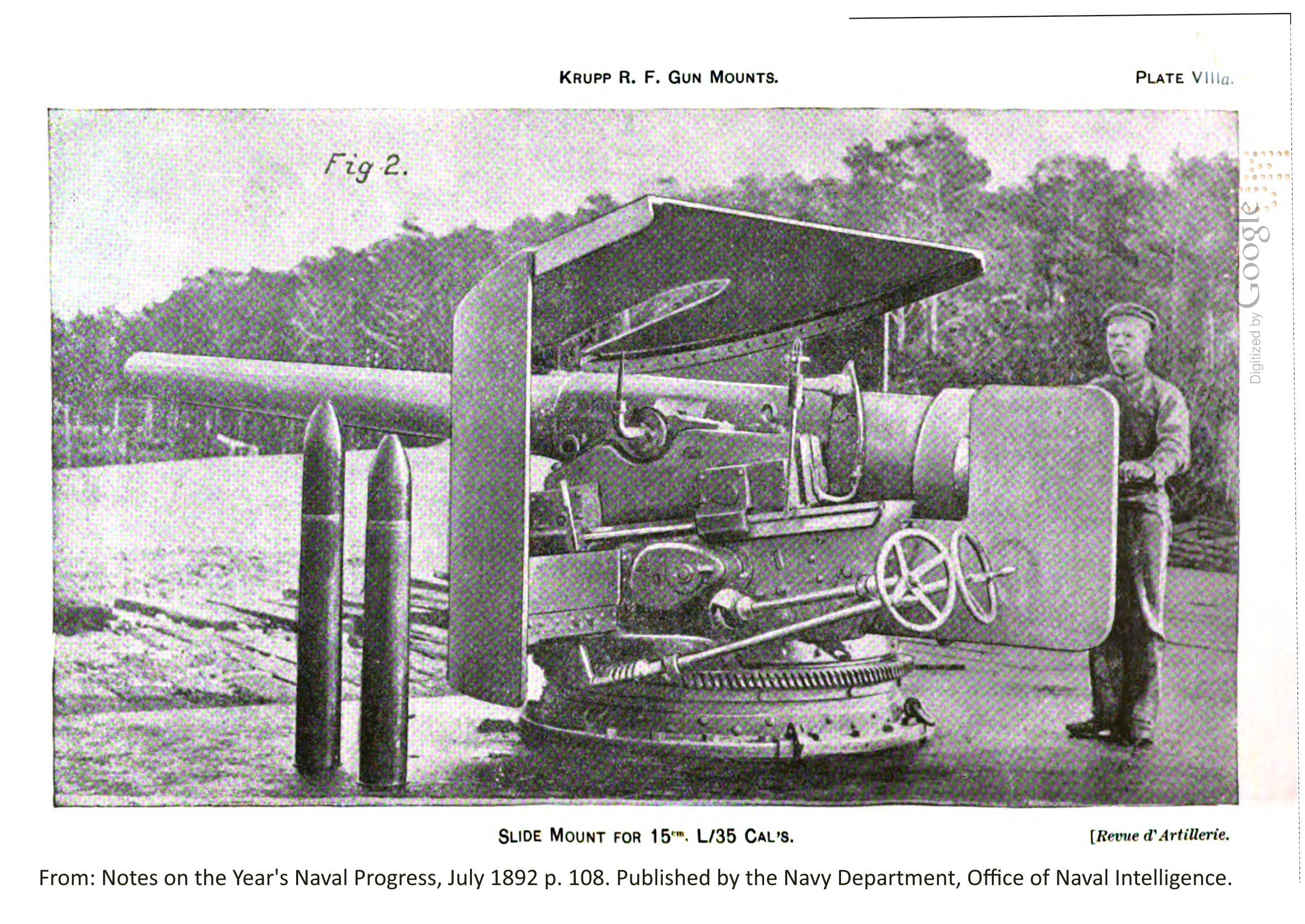
15 cm SK L/35 on slide mount

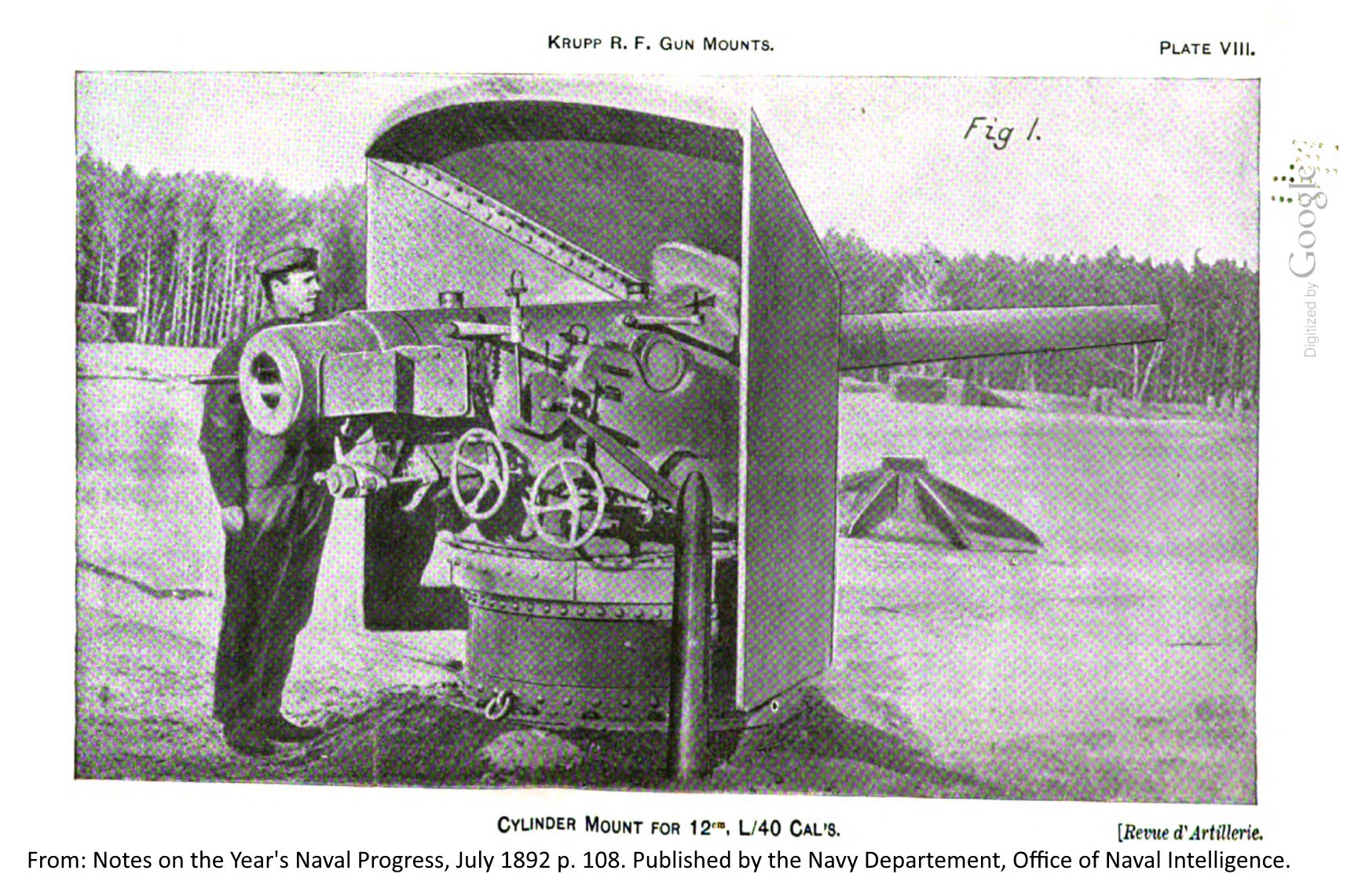
12 cm SK L/40 on cylinder mount

For a quick-firing gun like the 15 cm SK L/35, the carriage or mount was an essential feature. Traditionally, the recoil of navy guns was absorbed by letting the gun roll backwards on small wheels which offered a lot of resistance due to the weight of the gun. The early Krupp Ring Kanone mostly used a slide carriage. It meant that the carriage was robbed of its wheels and slid backwards on rollers over a frame (Rahm) which contained a braking cylinder. The frame was often placed at an angle, so gravity or the brake then returned the gun to its original position. This was very handy, but it still meant that the gun had to be aimed again.

Returning the gun barrel to its original position was not easy, as very heavy forces had to be dealt with. Krupp applied two early solutions to its quick firing guns.

The slide type of carriage for Schnelladekanone still had a kind of upper carriage on rollers. It had two hydraulic cylinders that aided the return to battery. The sights moved back with the upper carriage, and so they required long control handles to keep the gun captain out of the way of the recoil (see image).

In the cylinder mount, the gun slid in a cylinder which hung on 'trunnions' connected to the carriage. It meant that the sights did not recoil with the gun. The recoil cylinder was below the center line of the gun and contained a spring to move the barrel back to battery. This seems to have been the most modern solution. See the image of the 12 cm SK L/40 on cylinder mount.

The weight of the naval carriage of the 15 cm SK L/35 was 5,000 kg. Its 30 mm thick shield weighed 1,900 kg. Firing height was 1,199 mm.

=== Ammunition ===
Originally designed to use one piece ammunition 1.33 m (4 ft 4 in) long and weighing 68 kg (150 lb) the gun was redesigned to use two part quick loading cased charges and projectiles due to complaints about the size and weight of the ammunition. By breaking the ammunition down into two pieces the rate of fire was improved and crew workload was eased.

In April 1892, the 15 cm SK L/35 was officially accepted for use in the German Navy. It then fired 45.5 kg (100 pound) or 34.5 kg (76.1 pound) projectiles with a 15.4 pound charge. Initial velocity was then respectively 620 and 710 m/s.

Also in 1892, the charge was given as 6.6 kg of W.P. C/89 gunpowder. This gave a velocity at the muzzle of 656 m/s. At 1,000 m this was 568 m/s.

== Naval Use ==
=== German Empire ===
- SMS Kaiserin Augusta - This protected cruiser had six 15 cm SK L/35 guns per side, amidships as its primary armament after an 1896 refit.

=== Austria-Hungary ===
- Kaiser Franz Joseph I class - This class of two protected cruisers had three 15 cm SK L/35 guns per side, amidships as their secondary armament.
- SMS Kaiserin und Königin Maria Theresia - This armored cruiser had four 15 cm SK L/35 guns per side, amidships as its secondary armament.

=== China ===
- Kuang Yuan-class - This class of four gunboats had one 15 cm SK L/35 as their primary armament.
- Pao Min - This cruiser had a primary armament of one forward 15 cm SK L/35 and a second gun on the quarterdeck.
- Pingyuan - This gunboat had one shielded 15 cm SK L/35 gun per side, amidships as its secondary armament.
- Jiyuan - This protected cruiser had one shielded 15 cm SK L/35 gun, aft as its secondary armament.
- Wei Yuen-class - This class of six sloops were each refitted with two 15 cm SK L/35 guns.

=== Denmark ===
- HDMS Fyen - This unprotected cruiser mounted two 15 cm SK L/35 guns as its primary armament.
- HDMS Gorm - This monitor had two 15 cm SK L/35 guns mounted in a central turret amidships as its primary armament after a 1903 refit.
- HDMS Hekla - This protected cruiser had one 15 cm SK L/35 gun, fore and aft as its primary armament.
- HDMS Valkyrien - This protected cruiser had three 15 cm SK L/35 guns per side, amidships as its secondary armament.

=== The Netherlands ===
- Evertsen class - This class of three coastal defense ships had one 15 cm SK L/35 gun per side, amidships as their secondary armament.

=== The Ottoman Empire ===
- Hamidiye - This central battery ironclad had five 15 cm SK L/35 guns per side as secondary armament.
- Iclaliye - This central battery ironclad was refitted with two 15 cm SK L/35 guns.

=== Romania ===
- NMS Elisabeta - This protected cruisers primary armament consisted of two 15 cm SK L/35 guns per side, in sponsons amidships.

== Land use ==
In addition to its naval artillery role the 15 cm SK L/35 was also used as coastal artillery in either armored gun turrets or on garrison mounts. The garrison mount consisted of a rectangular steel firing platform which sat on a concrete slab behind a parapet with a pivot at the front and two wheels at the rear to give a limited amount of traverse. The recoil system consisted of a U-shaped gun cradle which held the trunnioned barrel and a slightly inclined firing platform with a hydro-gravity recoil system. When the gun fired the hydraulic buffers under the front slowed the recoil of the cradle which slid up a set of inclined rails on the firing platform and then returned the gun to position by the combined action of the buffers and gravity.

== Ammunition ==
Ammunition was of separate quick loading type with a cased charge and projectile. The charge for AP and Common shells weighed 8 kg (18 lb). The charges for Shrapnel were 3.7–5.2 kg (8.2–11.5 lb).

The gun was able to fire:
- Armor Piercing - 41 kg (90 lb)
- Common shell - 43.7 kg (96 lb)
- Shrapnel - 29 kg (64 lb)

== Photo Gallery ==
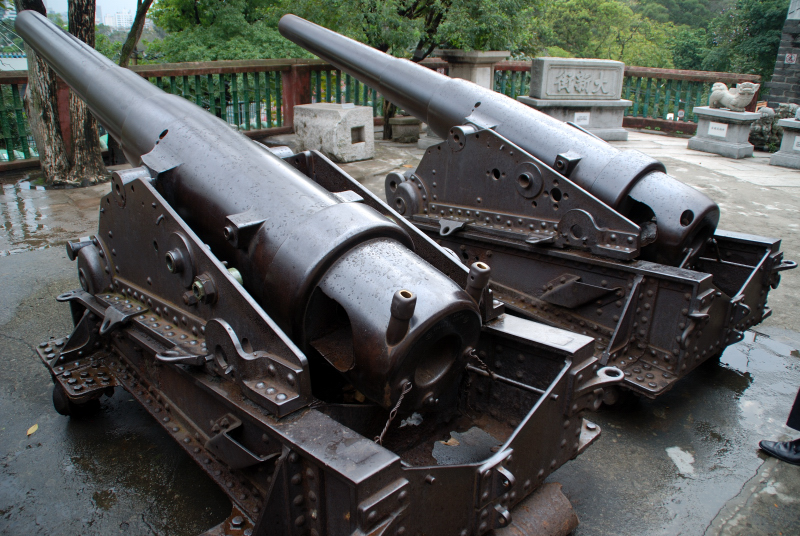
Coastal artillery at the Guangzhou Museum.

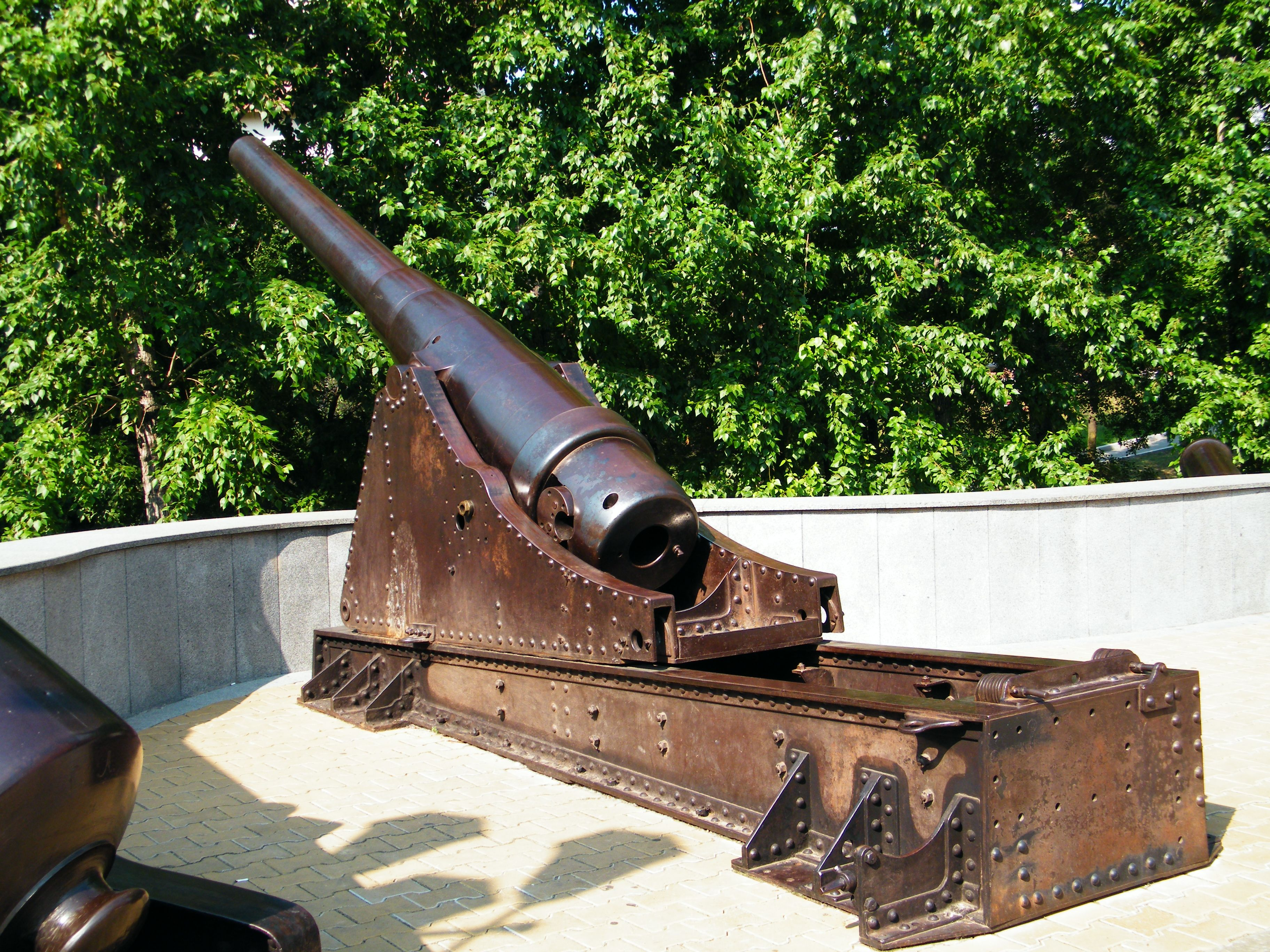
Coastal artillery at the Khabarovsk Krai Local Museum.

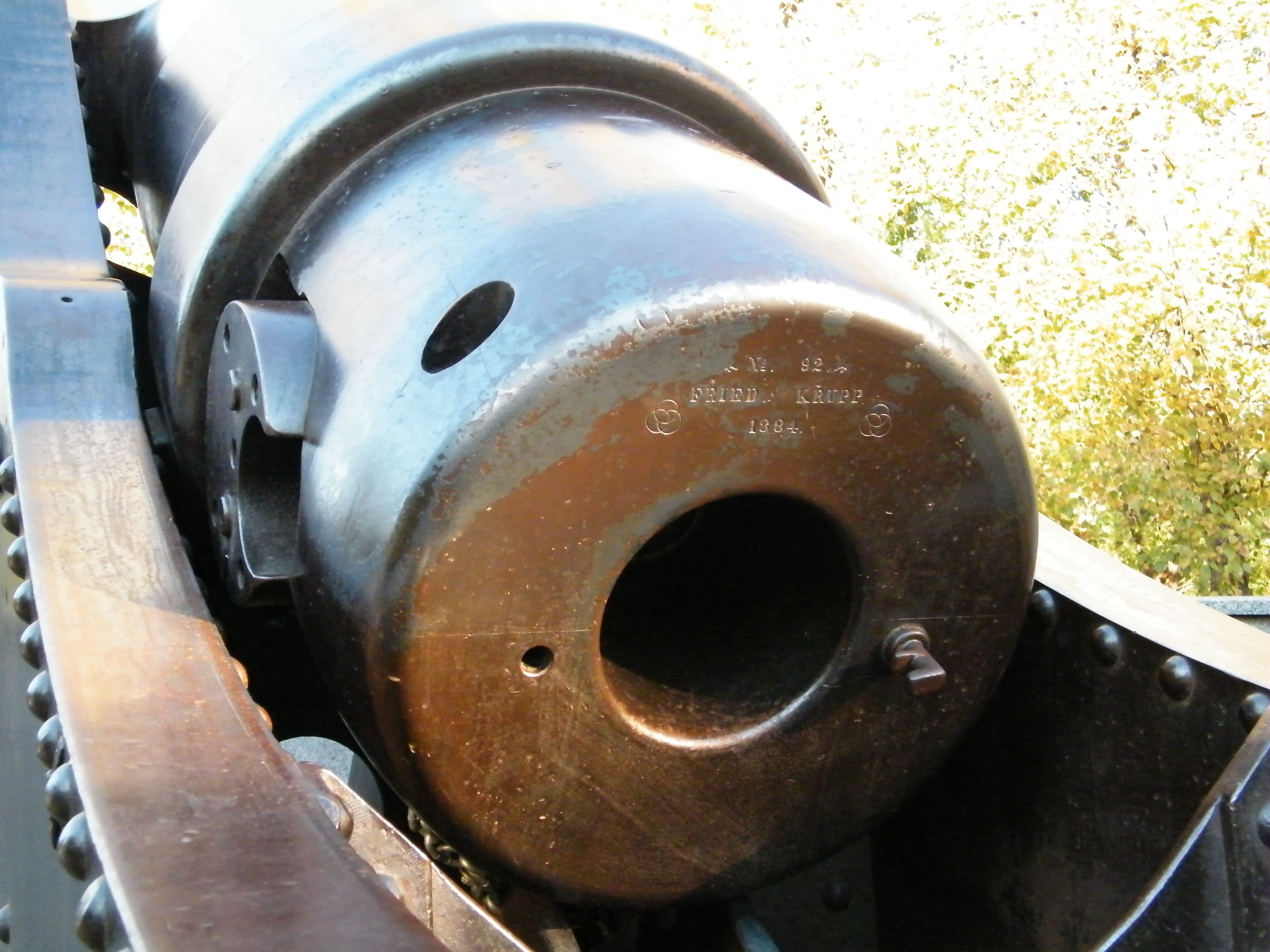
The breech block of a 15 cm SK L/35 at the Khabarovsk Krai Local Museum.
