= 21 cm L/35 =

1890 German naval artillery

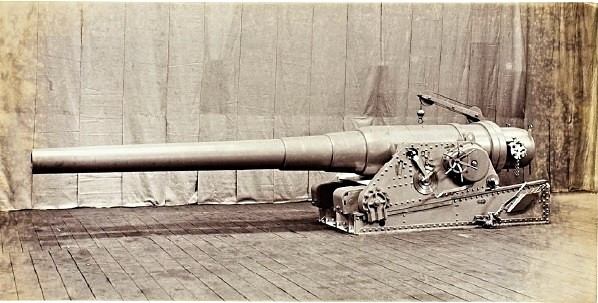
- Type: Naval gun; Coastal artillery
- Place of origin: German Empire

Service history
- In service: 1890–1936
- Used by: Argentine Navy; Imperial Chinese Navy; Royal Danish Navy; Imperial Japanese Navy; Royal Netherlands Navy
- Wars: First Sino-Japanese War; Boxer Rebellion; Russo-Japanese War

Production history
- Designer: Krupp
- Designed: 1886
- Manufacturer: Krupp
- Produced: 1890
- Variants: No. 1 and No. 2

Specifications
- Mass: No. 1: 13.9 t (15.3 short tons); No. 2: 14.6 t (16.1 short tons)
- Length: 7.3 m (23 ft 11 in)
- Barrel length: 6.7 m (22 ft 0 in)
- Shell weight: 140 kg (310 lb)
- Caliber: 209.3 mm (8.24 in) 35 caliber
- Muzzle velocity: No. 1: 548 m/s (1,800 ft/s) with 43 kg (95 lb) propellant charge; No. 2: 580 m/s (1,900 ft/s) with 54 kg (119 lb) propellant charge

The 21 cm L/35 were a family of German naval artillery developed in the years before World War I and used in limited numbers. This gun armed warships of the Argentine Navy, Imperial Chinese Navy, Royal Danish Navy, Imperial Japanese Navy and Royal Netherlands Navy before and after World War I. It was used in the First Sino-Japanese War, Boxer Rebellion and a ship captured by Japan in the Sino-Japanese War was later used in the Russo-Japanese War.

== History ==
In 1886, Krupp designed the 21 cm L/35 and started production for export customers in 1890. The 21 cm L/35 was produced in two models the No. 1 and No. 2. The main difference between the two guns was their weight, rifling, propellant charges and muzzle velocities. Otherwise their overall length and ammunition were the same.

The 21 cm came in different variants:

- Model 1880: L25, L30, L35
- Model 1887: L35, L40
- Model 1889: L40, L50

=== Naval use ===
==== Argentina ====
- ARA Veinticinco de Mayo – one shielded 21 cm L/35 gun fore and one shielded, 21 cm L/35 gun aft

==== China ====
- Jingyuan – two 21 cm L/35 guns mounted in a forward barbette
- Laiyuan – two 21 cm L/35 guns mounted in a forward barbette
- Jiyuan – two 21 cm L/35 guns mounted in a forward barbette

==== Denmark ====
- HDMS Valkyrien – one shielded 21 cm L/35 gun fore and one shielded 21 cm L/35 gun aft

==== Netherlands ====
The Dutch navy used:

- 21 cm A No. 1 = Model 1880/L35
- 21 cm A No. 2 = Model 1887/L35

The 21 cm A No. 1 was used on:

- Evertsen-class coastal defence ship – two mounted 21 cm L/35 turret guns fore and one aft
- Ever-class gunboat – one forward shielded 21 cm L/35 gun after 1890s refits

The 21 cm A No. 2 was used on:

- HNLMS Koningin Wilhelmina der Nederlanden – secondary armament of one shielded 21 cm L/35 gun aft
- HNLMS Sumatra – one 21 cm L/35 gun in a forward turret
- HNLMS Reinier Claeszen – one 21 cm L/35 gun in a forward turret

== Gallery ==
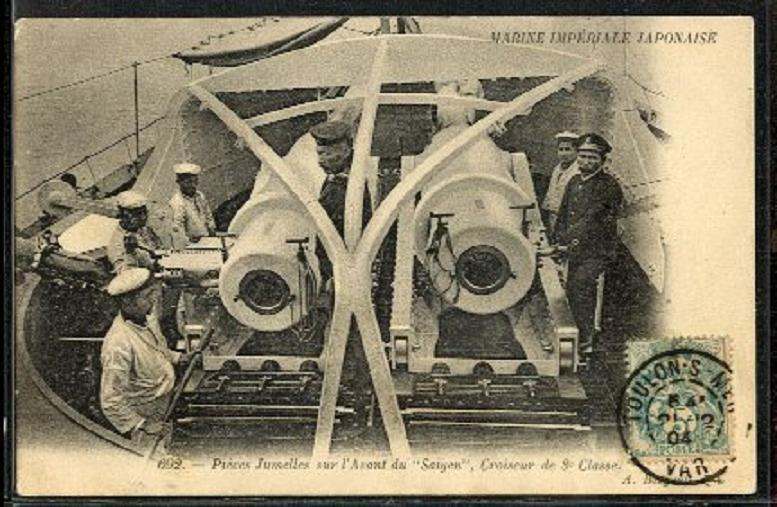
The forward barbette of the Jingyuan renamed Saien in IJN service which was sunk during the Russo-Japanese War.

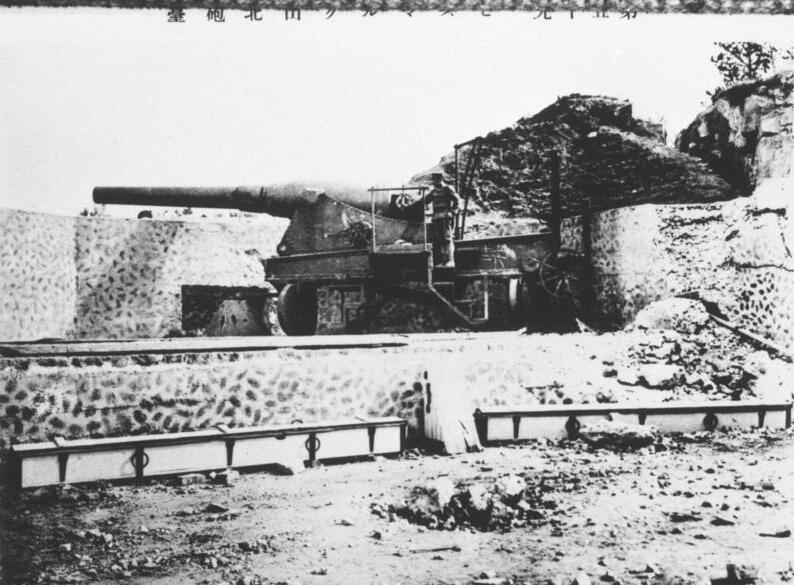
A 21 cm L/35 gun at the German fort at Tsingtau.
