= Nyah =

Nyah may refer to:

- Nyah nyah nyah nyah nyah nyah, a children's chant
- Nyah, Victoria, a town in Australia
  - Nyah West, a town to the west of Nyah
  - Nyah Football Club, an Australian rules football club
  - Nyah Nyah West United Football Netball Club, an Australian rules football club
- Nyah, a composition by Hans Zimmer from Mission: Impossible 2 (soundtrack)
- Jenifah Nyah, a former member of Black Uhuru
- An alternate transliteration of the Japanese onomatopoeia for "meow"

== See also ==
- Nya
- Nyan
- Nia
- Naya
- Naia
