= NIA =

NIA, Nia, or nia may refer to:

- Nia (given name), including a list of people and fictional characters
- Nia (fitness), a type of aerobic exercise
- Nia (charity), a women's aid organisation based in London
- NIA, a spanish salsa singer
- Nia (fungus), a genus of marine fungi
- SS Nia, a French steamship in service 1952–1954
- Nia, a principle of Kwanza
- Nia (album), a music album by Blackalicious
- Project NIA, an American organization supporting youth in trouble with the law
- ICAO designator of Nile Air, an Egyptian airline
- Nimba Airport, Nimba, Liberia (IATA airport code NIA)
- nia, ISO 639-2 and -3 codes for the Nias language
- Janjgir Naila railway station (station code: NIA) in Chhattisgarh, India

== Acronyms ==
- National Intelligence Agency, former name of the State Intelligence Services (the Gambia)
- Nanotechnology Industries Association, an international association of nanotechnology companies
- National Immigration Administration, an agency under the Ministry of Public Security in the People's Republic of China
- National Immigration Agency, an agency under the Ministry of the Interior in the Republic of China (Taiwan)
- National Infrastructure Assessment, published by the UK National Infrastructure Commission
- National Indoor Arena, former name of an indoor arena in Birmingham, England, United Kingdom
- National Institute of Accountants, the former name until 2011 for the Institute of Public Accountants in Australia
- National Institute of Aerospace, an aerospace research institute in the United States
- National Institute on Aging, a health research institute in the United States
- National Institute of Ayurveda, apex training and research institute in Ayurveda in India
- National Intelligence Agency (disambiguation), various governmental organizations
- National Intelligence Authority, a United States government authority from 1946 to 1947
- National Investigation Agency, the counter-terrorism agency in India
- National Iraqi Alliance, a Shi'a Islamist electoral coalition in Iraq
- National Irrigation Administration, a Philippine government agency for irrigation development and management
- Nature Improvement Area, a UK landscape-scale nature conservation designation
- Net income attributable, a concept in the United States tax code related to Individual Retirement Accounts
- Net Internal Area, a methodology for measuring building areas for real estate
- Neural Impulse Actuator, a peripheral for gaming on Windows computers
- New interdependence approach in the theory of international relations
- Nigerian Institute of Architects, a professional association in Nigeria
- informal acronym for Noi Bai International Airport, Hanoi, Vietnam
- Northern Ireland Assembly, the legislature of Northern Ireland
- Nuclear Industry Association, the trade association for the UK's civil nuclear industry

== See also ==
- NIAS (disambiguation)
