= Nyad =

Nyad may refer to:

- Diana Nyad (born 1949), American author and swimmer
- Nyad (film), 2023 sports drama film
  - Nyad (soundtrack), soundtrack to the film
- Nyad (Ninjago), an episode of Ninjago

== See also ==
- Naiad (disambiguation)
- Niad (disambiguation)
- Nya (disambiguation)
