= The Boys in the Boat (soundtrack) =

The Boys in the Boat (Original Motion Picture Soundtrack)

Film score by Alexandre Desplat
- Released: December 22, 2023
- Recorded: August–November 2023
- Studio: Abbey Road Studios
- Genre: Film score
- Length: 78:22
- Label: Sony Classical
- Producer: Alexandre Desplat

Alexandre Desplat chronology
Nyad (Soundtrack from the Netflix Film) (2023)	The Boys in the Boat (Original Motion Picture Soundtrack) (2023)	The Regime (Soundtrack from the HBO Original Series) (2024)

Singles from The Boys in the Boat (Original Motion Picture Soundtrack)
- 1. "The Boys in the Boat" Released: December 8, 2023

The Boys in the Boat (Original Motion Picture Soundtrack) is the soundtrack album composed by Alexandre Desplat to the 2023 film of the same name directed by George Clooney. The soundtrack album, consisting of 22 tracks, was released digitally by Sony Classical Records on December 22, 2023, three days ahead of the film's release in the United States.

== Development ==
The Boys in the Boat marked Desplat's fifth collaboration with Clooney, following The Ides of March (2011), The Monuments Men (2014), Suburbicon (2017) and The Midnight Sky (2020). His inclusion was confirmed in early October 2023. Desplat felt that he never worked on a "full-fledged sports film" and felt the film as "a good way of starting" exploring Joe's journey and the sports as well. Recorded at the Abbey Road Studios in August–November 2023, Desplat simultaneously worked on this score along with Nyad.

== Reception ==
Music critic Jonathan Broxton called it "a real return to form for Alexandre Desplat after a few years of ups and downs". Pete Hammond of Deadline Hollywood said, "Two-time Oscar winner Alexandre Desplat's lovely score avoids the usual beats for this genre and is well matched to what we see on screen". Variety's Owen Gleiberman described the score as "thick with traditional combat valor", while Mae Abdulbaki of Screen Rant and Amy Nicholson of The New York Times called it "moving" and "plucky". Sheri Linden of The Hollywood Reporter said that Desplat's "gentle, versatile score is fully in tune with". Tim Grierson of Screen International described it as a "fleet, thrilling orchestral music". Nick Schager of The Daily Beast wrote, "Alexandre Desplat’s accompanying musical compositions lean into the sequence’s melodramatic atmosphere, the result being a form-content synergy that establishes rowing as a sport predicated on the harmony between man, craft, instrument, and nature."

== Track listing ==
No.	Title	Length
1.	"The Boys in the Boat"	4:21
2.	"Coaches"	5:14
3.	"Jo's Solitude"	3:24
4.	"Oars"	3:11
5.	"The Team"	1:42
6.	"Getting Stronger"	2:06
7.	"Training"	0:56
8.	"First Win"	4:31
9.	"Joe Out of Sync"	3:17
10.	"Boat Ride"	3:03
11.	"Love Letter"	2:17
12.	"Pacific Regatta"	3:11
13.	"We Were Never Eight"	5:46
14.	"Check from Cal"	1:37
15.	"Broke"	2:14
16.	"Berlin"	1:48
17.	"Qualifications"	5:10
18.	"Olympic Final"	2:38
19.	"Talk with Dad"	4:19
20.	"USA Rowing Team" (film version)	4:04
21.	"USA Rowing Team" (alternate version)	4:03
22.	"Poughkeepsie"	9:30
Total length:		78:22
