= Nya =

Nya or NYA may refer to:

== Arts and entertainment ==
- Nya (film), a 2017 Burmese film
- Nya (Ninjago), a character in Ninjago
- NYA (Neil Young Archives), Neil Young's archive of recorded and visual works

== Businesses and organisations ==
- National Youth Administration, a 1930s New Deal program in the United States
- National Youth Agency, an educational charity in England and Wales
- National Youth Assembly, an annual Church of Scotland youth gathering
- New York Airways, a helicopter service in the New York City area 1949-1979
- New York and Atlantic Railway, a Long Island, New York, freight railway
- North Yarmouth Academy, an independent school in Yarmouth, Maine, U.S.
- National Youth Alliance, right-wing political group

== Linguistics ==
- Chewa language, ISO 939-2/3 language code nya
- Nganasan language (autonym: ня”, nya")
- ڽ, nya, a letter in the Jawi alphabet
- ꦚ, nya (Javanese), a letter in the Javanese script
- Ña (Indic), a letter in Indic writing systems
- Ñ, a character in the Spanish alphabet
- "Nyā", a transliteration of the Japanese equivalent for "meow"

== People ==
- Nya de la Rubia (born 1986), Spanish singer
- Nya Harrison (born 2002), American soccer player
- Nya Kirby (born 2000), an English footballer
- Nya Quesada (1919–2013), an Argentine actress
- Nyachomba Muchai-Kinya, known professionally as Nya, a contestant on season 22 of American Idol

== Animals ==
- Nya (dog), a service dog in the UK

== See also ==
- Nyad (disambiguation)
- Nyah (disambiguation)
