= Nias-class gunboat =

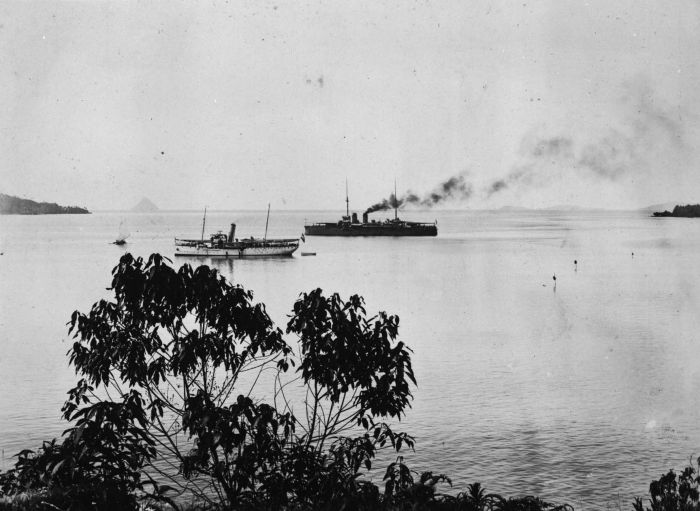
- Nias (front) and De Zeven Provinciën

Class overview
- Name: Nias
- Builders: Koninklijke Maatschappij de Schelde, Flushing (2); Huygens en van Gelder, Amsterdam (2)
- Operators: Royal Netherlands Navy
- Completed: 4

General characteristics
- Type: Gunboat
- Displacement: 680 tons; 810-820 tons (full load)
- Length: 53.9 m (176 ft 10 in)
- Beam: 9.44 m (31 ft 0 in)
- Draught: 3.69 m (12 ft 1 in)
- Propulsion: 1,300 ihp (970 kW), two shafts
- Speed: 12.9 knots (23.9 km/h)
- Complement: 97
- Armament: 3 × 12 cm (4.7 in) Nias; 2 × 10.5 cm (4.1 in) (2 × 1) rest; 1 × 7.5 cm (3.0 in)

The Nias-class was a class of four colonial schroefstoomschepen 4e klasse (gunboats) built by Huygens en van Gelder in Amsterdam and Koninklijke Maatschappij de Schelde in Flushing for the Royal Netherlands Navy. The class comprised Nias, Mataram, Edi and Serdang.

== Description ==
The ships were 53.9 metres (176 ft 10 in) long, had a beam of 9.44 metres (31 ft 0 in), a draught of 3.69 metres (12 ft 1 in), and had a displacement of 680 tons and 810-820 tons at full load. The ships had a top speed of 12.9 knots (23.9 km/h). The main armaments of the ships were two 10.5 cm (4.1 in) single guns and one 7.5 cm (3.0 in) gun. Nias carried three 12 cm (4.7 in) guns instead of the two 10.5 cm (4.1 in) the others had. The ship had a complement of 97 men.

== Construction ==
Name	Builder	Laid down	Launched	Completed	Fate
Nias	Huygens en van Gelder	1894	11 July 1895	21 January 1896	1907 to Gouvernementsmarine
Mataram	Huygens en van Gelder	1895	1896	6 January 1897	1 Februari 1916 training ship for local personnel in East Indies, 24 May 1927 decommissioned.
Edi	De Schelde	1896	1897	1 June 1897	1 November 1910 to Gouvernementsmarine.
Serdang	De Schelde	1896	15 May 1897	15 September 1897	1921 minelayer, 1926 auxiliary tasks, Scuttled off Surabaya 6 March 1942

== Service history ==
All ships were meant to serve in the Dutch East Indies.

=== Nias ===
Nias was laid down in 1894 at the shipyard of Huygens en van Gelder at Amsterdam and launched in 1895. She began service in the Dutch East Indies in 1896. In February 1902 she was tasked with the defense of a newly built settlement at Merauke in New Guinea. In 1907 she was moved to subsidiary duties.

=== Mataram ===
Mataram was laid down in 1895 at the shipyard of Huygens en van Gelder at Amsterdam and launched in 1896. She began service in the Dutch East Indies in 1897. In 1916 she was moved to subsidiary duties and served as instruction vessel for the newly found Kweekschool voor Inlandse Schepelingen in Makassar.

=== Edi ===
Edi was laid down in 1896 at the shipyard of Koninklijke Maatschappij de Schelde at Flushing and launched in 1897. She began service in the Dutch East Indies in 1897. In 1910 she was moved to subsidiary duties.

=== Serdang ===
Serdang was laid down in 1896 at the shipyard of Koninklijke Maatschappij de Schelde at Flushing and launched in 1897. She began service in the Dutch East Indies in 1897. In November 1904 she followed the Russian fleet that was steaming for Japan as it passed east of Sumatra. On 11 September 1905 the ship took part in an expeditions to South Celebes. She was part of a naval force consisting of De Ruyter, Hertog Hendrik, Borneo and two ships of the Koninklijke Paketvaart Maatschappij. The ships where engaged in operations against the lord of Loewoe. An infantry battalion and a marine landing party were set ashore near Palope and later that day the soldiers and marines took the lord's palace. Serdang was in 1921 converted into a minelayer and in 1932 into a torpedo repair ship. She eventually scuttled during World War II off Surabaya on 6 March 1942.
