= Nyaa =

Nyaa or NYAA may refer to:

- nyā, a transliteration of the Japanese onomatopoeia for a cat's meow
- Nyaa Torrents, a BitTorrent website
- New York Academy of Art
- Nyaa, a fictional cat character in Kodomo no Jikan
- Nyaa-tan, a fictional cat from Etotama

== See also ==
- Nya (disambiguation)
