= Naiad (disambiguation) =

The Naiads are water-centered nymphs in Greek mythology.

Naiad may also refer to:

== Entertainment ==
- Naiad (character), the water elemental of the DC Universe
- Naiad Press, a lesbian publisher operating in 1973–2003

== Science ==
- Aquatic plant of the genus Najas
- Naiad (bivalve), a common name for freshwater mussels
- Naiad (insect), a growth stage of certain insects
- Naiad (moon), a moon of Neptune

== Vessels ==
- A brand of rigid-hulled inflatable boat
- Naiad 18, a Canadian sailboat design
- HMS Naiad, one of several ships
- Napier Naiad, turboprop engine of the late 1940s
- USS Naiad (1863), a US Navy ship

== Other uses ==
- "The Naiad", a nickname of American Montenegrin political activist Nikola Petanović

== See also ==
- Niad (disambiguation)
- Nyad (disambiguation)
- NAIA (disambiguation)
- National Institute of Allergy and Infectious Diseases (NIAID), American federal research institute
