= NIAD =

NIAD may refer to:

- NIAD Art Center, an American nonprofit arts organization
- NIAD-QE, formerly NIAD, Government administrative agency in Japan

== See also ==
- Naiad (disambiguation)
- Nyad (disambiguation)
