= HNLMS Borneo =

History

Netherlands
- Name: Borneo
- Builder: J&G Thomson, Clydebank
- Laid down: 1892
- Launched: 1892

General characteristics
- Type: Gunboat
- Displacement: 800 tons
- Length: 53.86 m (176 ft 8 in)
- Beam: 9.45 m (31 ft 0 in)
- Draught: 4.05 m (13 ft 3 in)
- Propulsion: 1,040 ihp (780 kW)
- Complement: 102
- Armament: 6 × 10.5 cm (4.1 in); 1 × 7.5 cm (3.0 in)

HNLMS Borneo (Dutch: Zr.Ms. later Hr.Ms. Borneo) was a unique schroefstoomschip 4e klasse (gunboat) of the Royal Netherlands Navy built by J&G Thomson in Clydebank, Scotland.

== Description ==
The ship was 53.86 metres (176 ft 8 in) long, had a beam of 9.45 metres (31 ft 0 in), a draught of 4.05 metres (13 ft 3 in), and had a displacement of 800 tons. The main armaments of the ship were six 10.5 cm (4.1 in) guns and one 7.5 cm (3.0 in) gun. The ship had a complement of 102 men.

== Service history ==
Borneo was laid down in 1892 at the shipyard of J&G Thomson in Clydebank Glasgow and launched 24 November 1892. She began service in the Dutch East Indies in 1894.

On 11 September 1905 the ship took part in an expeditions to South Celebes. She was part of a naval force consisting of De Ruyter, Hertog Hendrik, Serdang and two ships of the Koninklijke Paketvaart Maatschappij. The ships where engaged in operations against the lord of Loewoe. An infantry battalion and a marine landing party were set ashore near Palope and later that day the soldiers and marines took the lord's palace.

From 1906 and onward she served as a survey vessel.
