= NIAS =

NIAS or Nias may refer to:

== Organisations ==
- National Institute of Advanced Studies (India)
- Nordic Institute of Asian Studies
- Netherlands Institute for Advanced Study
- Northern Ireland Ambulance Service
- Nederlandsch-Indische Artsen School, defunct Dutch East Indies medical school (1913-41)

== Places ==
- Nias, an island off the western coast of Sumatra, Indonesia
- Nias Regency, a regency in North Sumatra province, Indonesia

== Other uses ==
- Nias-class gunboat, Royal Netherlands Navy
- Nias people, of Indonesia
  - Nias language, their Austronesian language
- Nickel arsenide (NiAs), a chemical compound of nickel and arsenic
- NIAS, non-intentionally added substance in food-contact applications
- Ignace Tonené, Teme-Augama Anishnabai chief and fur trader also known as Nias
