= Karen Ingala Smith =

British campaigner and writer

Karen Ingala Smith is a British feminist who served as the CEO of nia, a domestic and sexual violence charity working to end violence against women and girls, based in London, UK from 2009 to 2023.

== Biography ==
Karen Ingala Smith has a BA from University of Kent and a PhD from University of Durham.

She is a Director of Woman's Place UK, an organisation that has been described as a transphobic hate group by the Labour Campaign for Trans Rights and others. In 2020 Karen Ingala Smith announced that her application to join the Labour Party had been rejected due to "conduct online that may reasonably be seen to demonstrate hostility based on gender identity."

Karen Ingala Smith is a co-creator of 'The Femicide Census' with Women's Aid (England), supported by Freshfields Bruckhaus Deringer LLP and Deloitte LLP. The UK Femicide Census is a database containing information on women killed by men in England and Wales since 2009 (and now including Northern Ireland and Scotland). The Femicide census is a project enabling the monitoring and analysis of men's fatal male violence against women with the aim of contributing to the reduction of the number of women killed by men. By gathering and combining data it is possible for service providers, law enforcement agencies, researchers and policy-makers to see that these killings are not isolated incidents and many follow similar patterns of male violence. The Femicide Census launched its first UK report in December 2016. In January 2022, data from the Femicide Census revealed that 52 of the men convicted of manslaughter or murder of women in the decade ending 2019 were either serving or past members of the armed forces. Her work in recording and commemorating UK women killed by men in a campaign called 'Counting Dead Women' has gained media coverage.

Smith is a trustee of the Emma Humphreys Memorial Prize and was awarded the Positive Role Model for Gender at the 2014 National Diversity Awards.

Smith works on issues relating to male violence against women and is often invited as a spokesperson to comment in news reporting. Her book Defending Women's Spaces is published by Polity Press in 2022
