= Middelburg Drydock =

- Officially: Prins Hendrik Dok (Dutch)
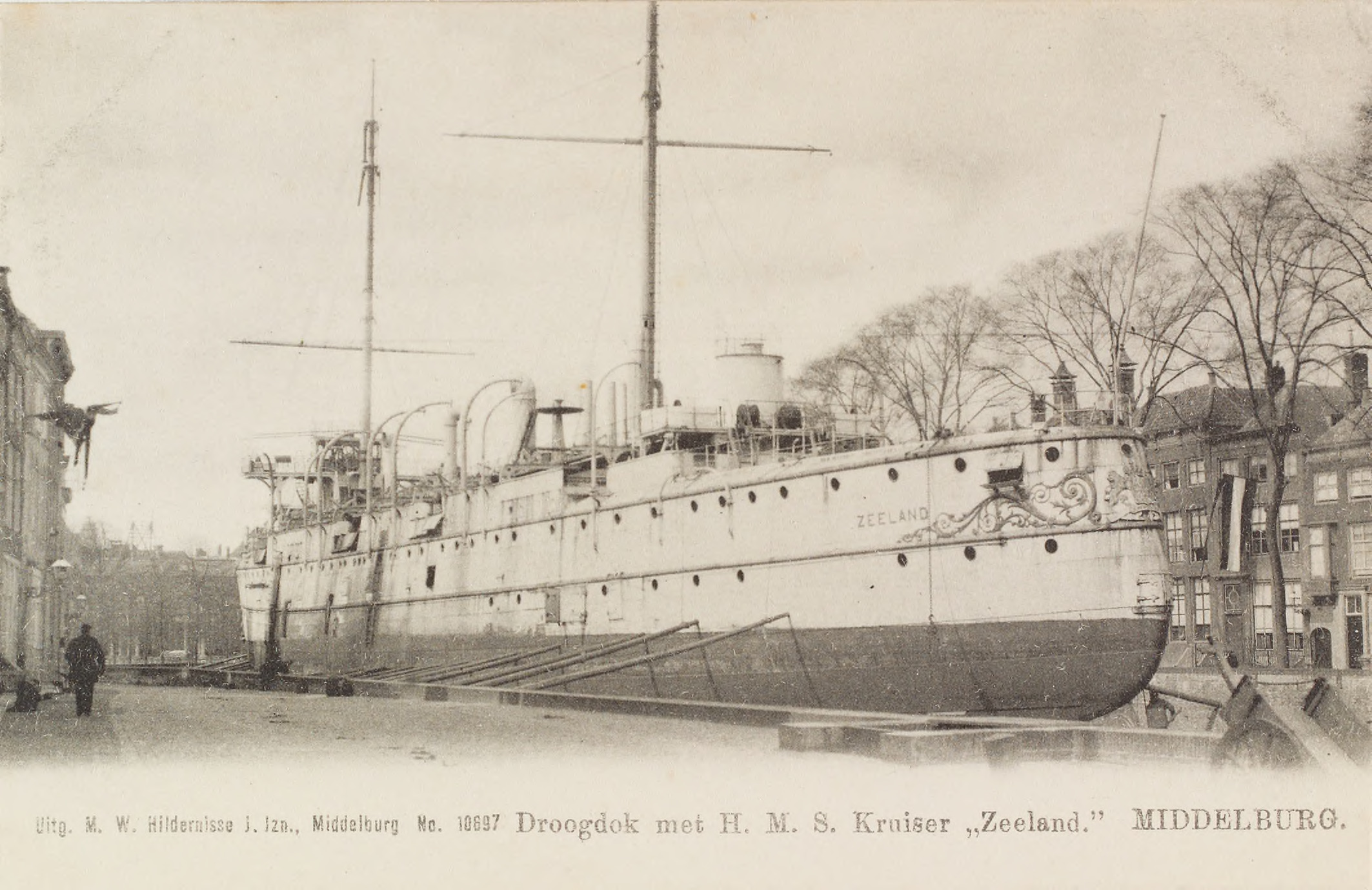
- Protected Cruiser HNLMS Zeeland on Middelburg Drydock
- Interactive map of the Middelburg Drydock area

General information
- Location: Dam, Middelburg, Zeeland, Netherlands
- Coordinates: 51.501015°N 3.619419°E
- Construction started: 23 September 1875
- Completed: 30 June 1876
- Closed: 1927
- Client: Van Zeijlen en Decker Shipping Line (former); De Schelde Shipyard (former)

Middelburg Drydock is a former dry dock in Middelburg, Netherlands. The Dock chamber still exists.

== Context ==
=== Middelburg ===
Middelburg is the capital of Zeeland. From the 15th to the 17th century, it was also a very important commercial center. In the seventeenth century it got to play a prominent part in the Dutch East India Company (VOC). In the Caribbean it became successful with the Middelburgsche Commercie Compagnie (MCC). At the end of the 18th century, the Middelburg economy ground to a halt. In 1807 the MCC was liquidated, and restarted as a shipyard. As such she acquired the former shipyards of the WIC, MCC, and finally those of the VOC in 1818.

By that time, the French period had entirely ruined the Middelburg economy, leading to a drastic drop in population. The construction of a new harbor canal from Middelburg to Veere, completed in 1817 did little to re-establish the situation. Next, the location of Middelburg and nearby Vlissingen became problematic. They are on Walcheren, which was an island at the time. When railways were introduced, they replaced part of inland water transport. Without a connection to the railroad, Middelburg then gradually became an isolated city.

=== Port of Vlissingen ===
By the mid-nineteenth century the importance and possibilities of railways for cargo transport were clear. Belgium wanted to construct a railway from Antwerp to Germany, the so-called Iron Rhine. The Netherlands feared this competition, because the Western Scheldt made Antwerp a much better harbor than the Dutch harbors. The government reacted with plans to improve the harbor of Vlissingen, on the Dutch side of the Westerschelde.

Vlissingen was situated on deep water, but it had only a minimal hinterland, because it was on an island. The 1860 a railway law made the funds available to create a railway from Vlissingen to the east, the Roosendaal–Vlissingen railway. Part of the works was the construction of the Sloedam, which was ordered in July 1866, and completed in June 1867. On 29 February 1872, the railway was opened. On 8 September 1872 the new Port of Vlissingen was opened.

The Port of Vlissingen was not an immediate success. One of the things that was thought to be missing was a modern dry dock, larger than the old Vlissingen Navy Drydock. The state was prepared to build this, but the Dutch Senate repudiated the plan in May 1873. In order to create the necessary facilities, the state then made another plan. In 1875 it made an agreement which would lead to the establishment of De Schelde Shipyard in the Port of Vlissingen. De Schelde also got the use of the former navy dry dock. The port itself was managed by the state, but could only become successful if shipping lines called at the port.

=== Canal through Walcheren ===
From 1870 to 1873 the Canal through Walcheren was constructed in connection to the construction of the port at Vlissingen. It was one of the Dutch canals suitable for ocean-going ships. At first it was planned to stretch from Vlissingen to Middelburg. Later it was extended to Veere, using the bed of the Nieuwe Haven Canal of 1817. It got a shallower branch, the Arne Canal, to Arnemuiden.

The construction of the costly Canal through Walcheren might have been done to compensate Middelburg for the closure of the Sloe. A different reason might have been the hope that Middelburg merchants would use the new port, or that the economy of Middelburg would be re-established once it had a good connection to the sea. Anyway, in the late evening of 17 December 1873 the frigate Bato captain H. Kramer of 1,501 ton capacity, arrived in Vlissingen from Batavia. Without unloading, she continued to Middelburg with a draft of 6.6 m, and unloaded there in the afternoon of the 18th.

== History ==
=== Van Zeijlen en Decker ===
With the new port and canal, the Rotterdam Shipping Line Van Zeijlen & Decker saw opportunities in Middelburg. In 1874 it acquired the former VOC terrains from the MCC, and founded the shipyard Middelburgsch Welvaren. It also planned to operate its ships from Middelburg in the future, and moved its headquarters to Middelburg.

=== Plans for a dry dock ===
Van Zeijlen en Decker almost immediately made plans for a dry dock in Middelburg. It planned to construct the dry dock in the stretch of the harbor between the Dambrug (Dam Bridge) and Dam (the Dam). The company then sent a request to the municipality to know whether the council was basically willing to let the company lease or otherwise use that terrain. The council confirmed this on 18 February 1874. On 18 June 1874 the council then treated a request by the company to have the terrain and a 50,000 guilder subsidy to establish the dry dock. On 13 July the council approved the request with 13 votes against 4.

=== Design ===
During the design phase the initial plans for the dry dock had to be changed. Also, the terrain for the dry dock had to be significantly expanded. It became the first Dutch 'setup dock' Opzettingsdok. It was designed by J. Dirks, chief engineer of Rijkswaterstaat. The new plans were approved by G. van Diesen, chief engineer of Rijkswaterstaat in Zeeland. On 14 April 1875 the detailed plans were discussed and approved by the municipal council.

=== Construction ===
Construction was tendered on 22 May 1875. There were three offers: L. Kalis Kz. from Sliedrecht for 261,860 guilders; Van de Velde from Papendrecht for 239,800 guilders; and B. Janse from Amsterdam for 199,890 guilders. B. Janse got the order, and had to complete it on 30 June 1876.

Already on 3 June the first materials for the dry dock were unloaded in Middelburg. Amongst these were 15 shiploads of brick, with which walls would be fixed or heightened. Another first step was the construction of a dam, do pumps could make the designated stretch of the harbor dry. Pile driving would come next. By 25 June the process of pumping the water out of the rear chamber was underway. On 30 July the principals had sent in a request for a permit to build a pumphouse with steam engine. By then the Dambrug had been removed completely, brickwork on the quay walls was underway, and the temporary dam was ready. On 17 September part of the quay and sewers near the old Dambrug collapsed over 30 meters, but this accident did not significantly delay the works.

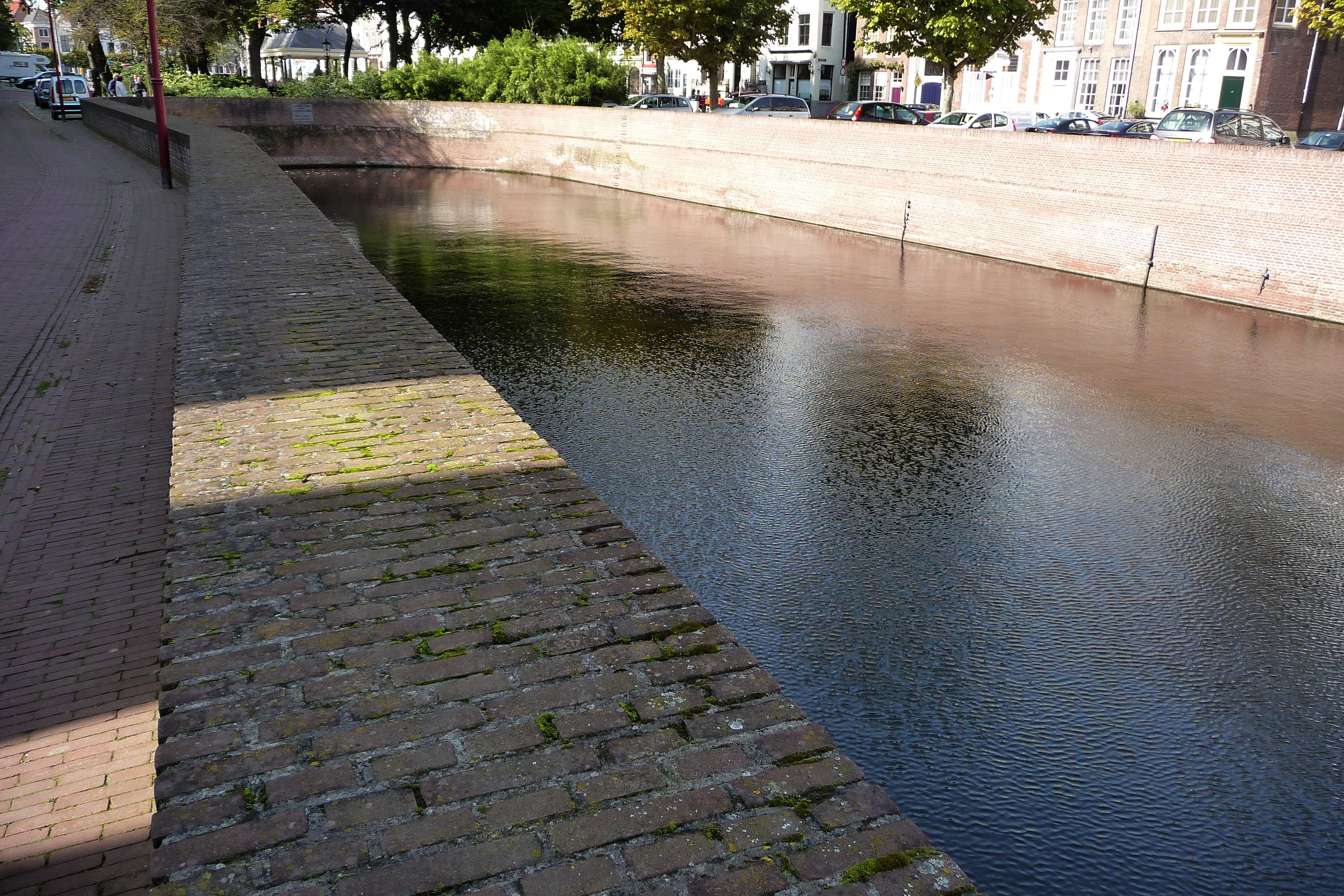
end of the dry dock with commemorative stone

The wall that enclosed the new dry dock was ready enough to place a commemorative stone on 23 September 1875. It was placed by Willem Lodewijk van Leeuwen and Cornelis de Decker Jz. This was also the moment that the dry dock got the official name Prins Hendrik Dok (Prins Hendrik Drydock). On 18 November 1875 most of the pile driving below the dry dock had been completed.

By January 1876 the floor of the backward part of the dry dock was under construction. By then a very deep pit had been dug for pile driving below the prospective caisson door bateau-porte (French) and Pumphouse. At the start of March brickwork was resumed. This time it was on the caisson lock, which also had to serve as a road. By then the floor of the dry dock itself was almost finished. Work then centered on the setup dock and the gate that separated it from the rest. On 27 April 1876 the steam pile driver drove the last pile into the ground. In late May the pumphouse was under construction, and several machines had already been placed. By 27 May construction was a bit ahead of schedule, and there were plans to dock Van Zeijlen en Decker's clipper Minister Fransen van de Putte on 15 June, which would net the contractor a premium of 1,000 guilders. On 12 June the removal of the Dok Bridge and its replacement by a double iron swing bridge with a wider opening was tendered. The order was won by B. Janse, for 30,800 guilders.

The opening ahead of schedule would not be achieved, but construction did make the original schedule. On 16 June the Ship Caisson was launched by Smit in Krimpen aan de Lek (or J. en K. Smit in Kinderdijk), and the dam had been partially removed. On 25 June the ship caisson arrived, towed by tugboat Reserve. It would be placed on the 26th, and next everything was prepared for the opening on 30 June 1876.

The opening, and docking of Minister Fransen van de Putte was a grand affair, with a historic tour of 86 persons with three historic and thematic wagons. Minister Fransen van de Putte was brought into the Achterdok (back dock). Because of the hurry, the ship caisson did not fit well immediately, and the steam engine had some trouble. Therefore, the water could not be pumped high enough at first, and later the dock could not be made dry enough to lower the ship on the blocks. Nevertheless, this seems to have happened in the evening, and the complete dock was dry on 3 July.

== Dock characteristics ==
=== Setup Drydock ===
Middelburg Drydock was a Setup Drydock. The idea, and the application of steam power to realize it, was first proposed by Jan Blanken in 1796. A Setup Drydock consists of a deep forward chamber, and a significantly shallower backward chamber. The idea is that a ship first enters the forward chamber of the dry dock. The water in the dry dock is then pumped up so high that the ship can enter the shallower backward dock. Most of the water can then simply be removed from the backward dock by letting it flow out via the dry dock's ship door. The amount of water that has to be pumped out to set the ship on the blocks, is then much smaller, and the backward chamber is generally very dry.

Hellevoetsluis Dry Dock is also a Setup Drydock. However, in Hellevoetsluis it seems more of a feature of the dry dock than a regular part of its operation. At Hellevoetsluis both chambers of the dry dock could be used to dock ships. At Middelburg Drydock the backward dock was the real dry dock.

A nice feature was that at Middelburg, the backward chamber had a sewer which discharged in the direction of Veere. This discharged to a lower water level, so that the backward chamber could be made almost completely dry without pumping, even while the forward chamber had a water level equal to the canal.

=== The Caisson Door ===
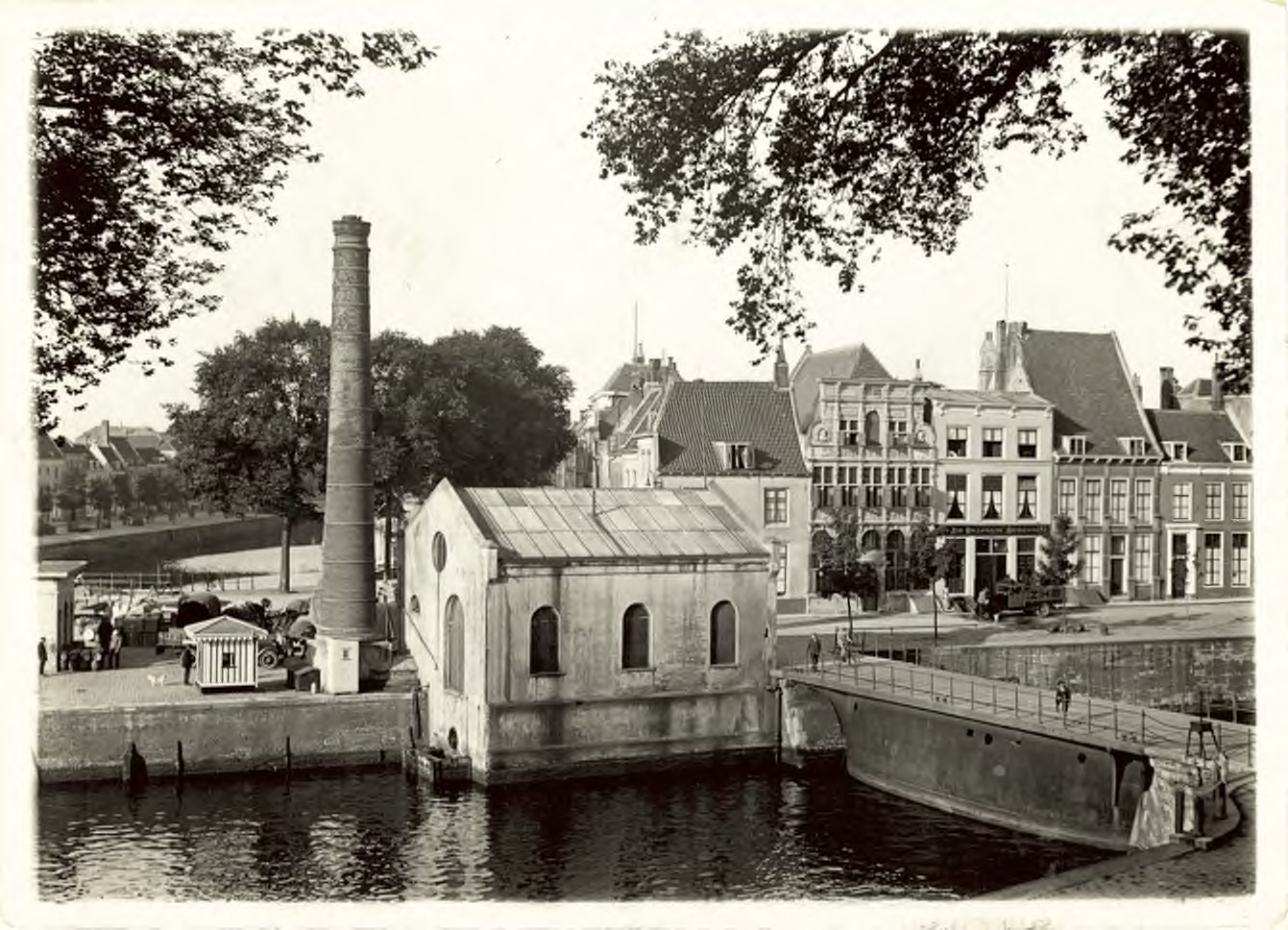
Pumphouse and caisson lock

A caisson door was used to close the dry dock. Such a ship caisson or bateau-porte was a French invention. By the time that Middelburg Drydock was under construction it was in general use in Dutch graving docks, and at some other places in the Netherlands.

=== Dimensions ===
In about 1880, the dimensions of the dry dock were given as 115 m long with an average width of 21 m. The width of the caisson lock was 17.80 m. Depth below the canal level was 4.50 m, but it is not clear to which chamber this applied. The total length was also given as 125 m. The dry dock had a bend, but the dockfloor was straight.

=== Pumphouse ===
The steam engine in the pumphouse was made by Smulders.

== Service ==
=== First service ===
Even while the first ship that was serviced, i.e. Minister Fransen van de Putte was still on the blocks, an accident happened to the dry dock. On 11 July 1876 water from the outside infiltrated below the pumphouse, leading to a cave in of the nearby quay. It turned out that the pumphouse then rested only on its foundation piles. By driving a screen of piles and inserting clay the damage was expected to be fixed for 7,000 guilders. Work on the ship in the dock did not suffer delayed. On 5 August 1876 Minister Fransen van de Putte was brought into the forward dock chamber, but after the ship caisson had been removed it got stuck on the remains of the dam which had been used during construction.

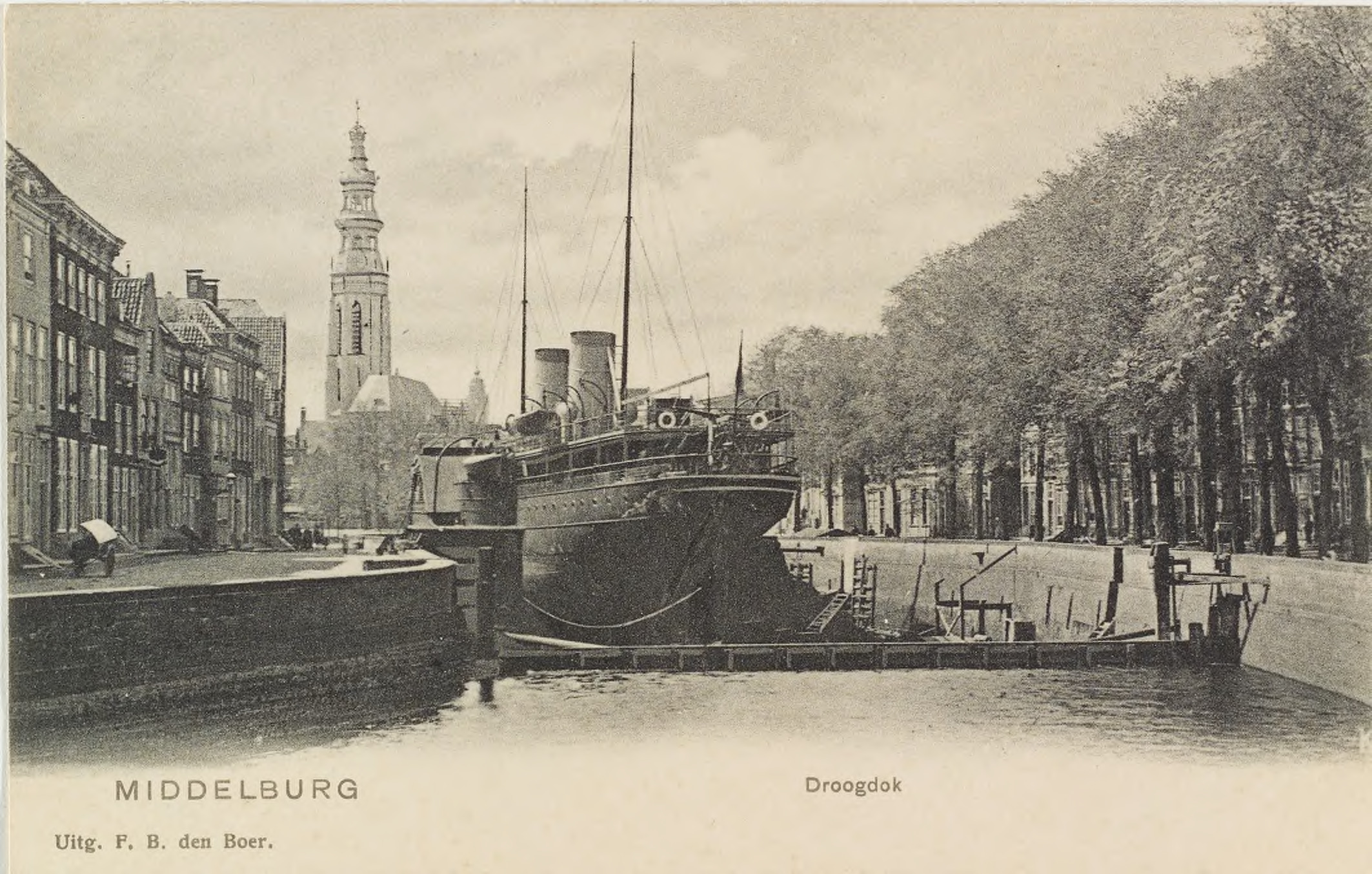
Middelburg Drydock showing the gate of the backward dock, c 1895

In late August 1876 a dam was again laid outside the dock, and a centrifugal pump was installed. Engineer Dirks was brought in from Amsterdam to assist. At many points the ground was reinforced by putting clay and basalt in place to stop water infiltration. The gate Klep between forward and backward dock was caulked to make it more watertight. On 28 September this gate proved to be still leaky. By 10 October the news was different, stating that water continued to flow below the gate to the backward dock. This then led to further reinforcement of the ground near this gate. On 20 November 1876 a trial was held in which the problems with the gate seemed to have been fixed.

In mid-December 1876 a new attempt to dock ships was made. However, this time the ship caisson did not fit, obviously because some other areas had caved in. Therefore, a new round of works started. These involved breaking out part of the masonry of the caisson lock, and creating a new foundation below part of it. By late January a screen of piles was being driven into the ground around the caisson lock, just like this had been done during the repairs of Willemsoord Dry Dock I. By 7 February this screen was almost finished.

By 12 April 1877 repairs were almost finished, and water was slowly let into the dry dock. Part of this was done to make the brickwork harden. On 14 April the back dock was pumped dry, and this time it could be kept dry. After the dam had been removed, the ship caisson was brought into place on 21 April. By 24 April the dry dock had 50 cm of water on its v-shaped floor, after not pumping for many days. After a final trial the repaired dry dock was approved on 28 April 1877.

On 12 May 1877 Middelburg Drydock was again taken into use. This time the big clipper Utrecht of 2,009 Dutch ton capacity was put on the blocks. Utrecht soon proved to require 4–5 weeks of work, and so the waiting Drenthe was brought to Antwerp. On 14 July Utrecht left the dry dock, and then it was empty. Next the two steamers of the Zeeland shipping line were docked, and then P. Caland of the Rotterdam America Steamship Company.

In 1877 both Van Zeijlen and Decker left the company Van Zeijlen en Decker, which was then owned by J.F. van Leeuwen. From 12 May to 31 December 1877 16 ships used the dock for 101 days. It was twice used simultaneously by two ships.

=== A dry dock in a minor harbor ===
Middelburg profited from the railway connection, the Port of Vlissingen and the Canal through Walcheren, but did not recover her former glory as a commercial center. In 1878 41 ocean-going ships arrived in Middelburg. The dry dock was used by 31 ships. In 1880 only 29 sea-going ships arrived, and only 16 vessels used the dry dock. In 1882 25 ships used the dry dock, amongst them the steamer Nederland of 95 m. in 1884 17 ships used the dry dock for 168 days. In 1885 37 sea-going ships arrived, and 24 ships used the dry dock. In 1890 33 ships used the dry dock. In 1891 30 ships used the dry dock for 117 days. Amongst these SS Prinses Amalia of the Netherland Line of 114 m. In 1892 the dry dock was used by 28 ships. As these numbers show, the harbor of Middelburg was not busy enough to generate enough traffic for the dry dock.

=== Change of ownership ===
On 18 May 1893 the Prins Hendrik Drydock and Middelburg's Welvaren shipyard were put up for auction. On 4 August 1893 the auction saw its second repetition, and both items were bought by De Schelde. The dry dock for 26,000 guilders, and the shipyard for 2,600 guilders.

=== Dry dock of De Schelde ===
This way De Schelde got a very long dry dock, for a very low price. In 1894 it used the dry dock to cut and lengthen two ships, Soembing (ex-Batavia) was in dock for 54 days, and Lawoe (ex-Zuid-Holland) for 40 days. Next Samarang was lengthened. In 1895 Smeroe (ex-Soerabaija) underwent the same operation in the dry dock.

In 1895 the armored warship Evertsen of 3,464 tons displacement used the dry dock to get her propellers attached. On 12 June 1896 the ocean liner Koningin Wilhelmina of 125 m was put in the dry dock. However, De Schelde did not bar others from using the dry dock.

The last ship that was docked in Middelburg Drydock was Destroyer Van Ghent, still named De Ruyter at the time. She entered in late August 1927, On 13 October 1927 she left the dry dock for trials in Scotland.

== The End ==
The official end of use of the dry dock came in 1930. In 1939 the caisson lock was replaced by a fixed bridge. In 1998 this bridge was replaced.

By 2003 the quay walls had been ruptured in many places. Later in 2003 another dam was laid to close of the dock for renovation. Most of the time, the water was only lowered enough to execute the works. However, for a short time the dock was almost dry, showing the wooden floor and the blocks.
