= HNLMS De Ruyter (1901) =

Koningin Regentes-class coastal defence ship

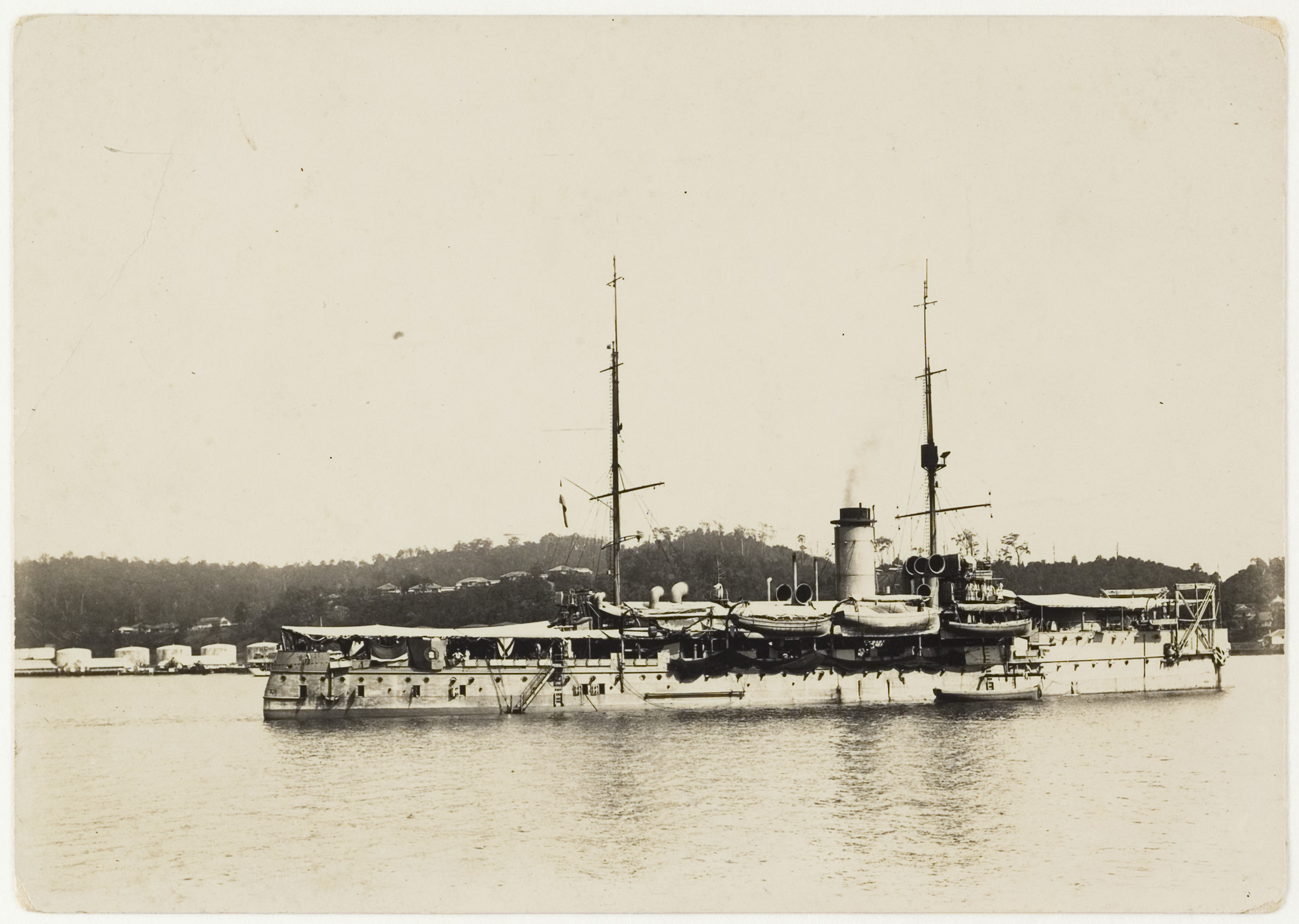
- De Ruyter in Balikpapan

History

Netherlands
- Name: De Ruyter
- Namesake: Admiral De Ruyter
- Builder: Maatschappij voor Scheeps- en Werktuigbouw Fijenoord, Rotterdam
- Laid down: 1900
- Launched: 28 September 1901
- Commissioned: 29 October 1902
- Decommissioned: 1923
- Fate: Scrapped

General characteristics
- Class & type: Koningin Regentes-class coastal defence ship
- Displacement: 5,002 tons
- Length: 96.622 m (317 ft 0 in)
- Beam: 15.189 m (49 ft 10 in)
- Draught: 5.817 m (19 ft 1 in)
- Installed power: 6,500 ihp (4,800 kW)
- Propulsion: 2 shafts, 2 reciprocating engines
- Speed: 16.5 knots (30.6 km/h; 19.0 mph)
- Complement: 340
- Armament: 2 × 9.4 in (24 cm) (2 × 1); 4 × 15 cm (5.9 in) (4 × 1); 8 × 7.5 cm (3.0 in) (8 × 1); 4 × 1pdr (4 × 1); 3 × 45 cm (18 in) torpedo tubes
- Armour: 6 in (15 cm) belt; 10 in (25 cm) barbette; 10 in (25 cm) turret

HNLMS De Ruyter (Dutch: Hr.Ms. De Ruyter) was a Koningin Regentes-class coastal defence ship (pantserschip) of the Royal Netherlands Navy. The ship was built by the Maatschappij voor Scheeps- en Werktuigbouw Fijenoord in Rotterdam just after the turn of the 20th century. The ship participated in two colonial expeditions in the Dutch East Indies. She made several journeys to show the flag and was finally decommissioned in 1923.

== Description ==
The ship was 96.622 metres (317 ft 0 in) long, had a beam of 15.189 metres (49 ft 10 in), a draught of 5.817 metres (19 ft 1 in), and had a displacement of 5,002 tons. The ship was equipped with two-shaft reciprocating engines, which were rated at 6,500 ihp (4,800 kW) and produced a top speed of 16.5 knots (30.6 km/h). The ship had belt armour of 6 in (15 cm), 10 in (25 cm) barbette armour and 10 in (25 cm) turret armour. The main armaments of the ship were two 9.4 in (24 cm) single turret guns. Secondary armaments included four single 15 cm (5.9 in) guns and eight 7.5 cm (3.0 in) single guns. The ship had a complement of 340 men.

== Service history ==
After being laid down in 1900, De Ruyter was built by the Maatschappij voor Scheeps- en Werktuigbouw Fijenoord in Rotterdam and launched on 28 September 1901. She was commissioned on 29 October 1902 and subsequently deployed to the Dutch East Indies.

On 24 June 1905 HNLMS Hertog Hendrik hit a coral reef near Matjidosteen while en route to the Gulf of Boni. HNLMS Zeeland made several attempts to pull the stranded ship loose, but these proved unsuccessful and were abandoned when Zeeland's bollards broke. The ship was later pulled clear after De Ruyter and Japara, a ship with towing equipment from the Koninklijke Paketvaart Maatschappij, arrived and Hertog Hendrik's coal, reserves and munitions were offloaded. Later that year De Ruyter, Hertog Hendrik, Borneo, Serdang and two ships of the Koninklijke Paketvaart Maatschappij took part in an expedition to South Celebes where they engaged in operations against the lord of Loewoe. An infantry battalion and a marine landing party were set ashore near Palopo and later that day the soldiers and marines took the lord's palace.

In 1906 De Ruyter, along with her sister ship, Koningin Regentes, and the protected cruiser Zeeland, assisted in an expedition to the island of Bali as part of Dutch attempts to integrate the southern kingdoms of Tabanan, Badung and Klungkung into the Dutch East Indies. On 16 and 17 September, the ships bombarded the city of Denpasar and afterwards ground forces broke what resistance remained.

On 15 December 1908 the ship left the port of Den Helder for Curaçao to reinforce the Dutch squadron that had been stationed off the Venezuelan coast following political tension between the two nations. Until then, the squadron had consisted of the Jacob van Heemskerck, and two protected cruisers, the Gelderland and the Friesland.

After this, the ship made two voyages around the Asia-Pacific to show the flag. The first began on 10 August 1909 when the ship, together with the Maarten Harpertszoon Tromp and the Koningin Regentes, departed from Batavia and sailed to China, Hong Kong, Japan and the Philippines. The second voyage was undertaken the following year, when De Ruyter and both her sister ships, Koningin Regentes and Hertog Hendrik, sailed to Australia after leaving the port of Surabaya on 15 August 1910. Brisbane, Melbourne, Sydney and Fremantle were included among the ports that were visited during this journey.

The ship was finally decommissioned in 1923.
