= HNLMS Zeeland (1897) =

Royal Netherlands Navy warship

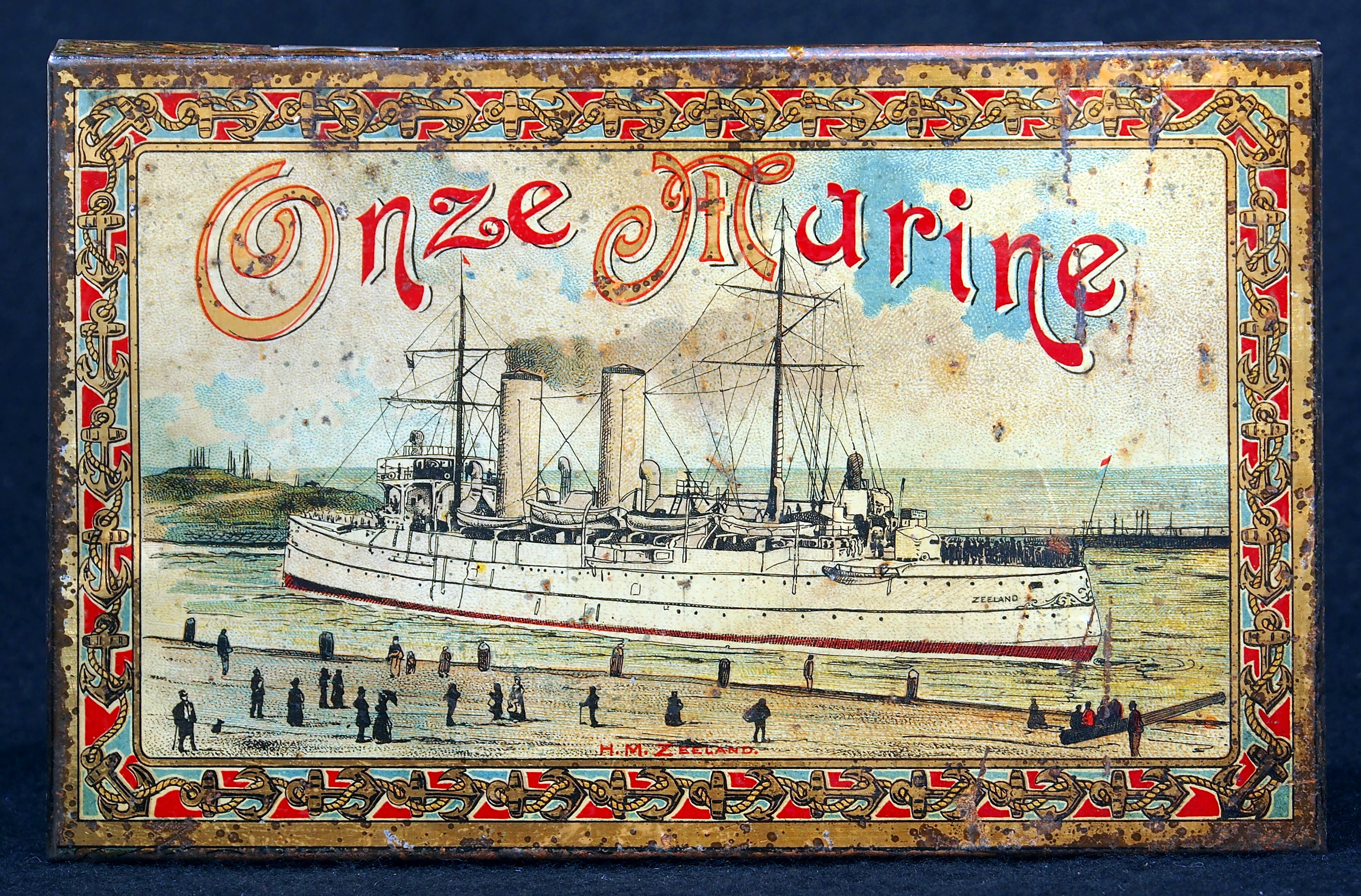
- Zeeland

History

Netherlands
- Name: Zeeland
- Namesake: Zeeland
- Builder: Koninklijke Maatschappij de Schelde in Flushing
- Laid down: 1895
- Launched: 20 March 1897
- Commissioned: 1 June 1898
- Decommissioned: 1924
- Fate: Scrapped

General characteristics
- Class & type: Holland-class cruiser
- Displacement: 3,900 tons
- Length: 93.3 m (306 ft 1 in)
- Beam: 14.8 m (48 ft 7 in)
- Draught: 5.41 m (17 ft 9 in)
- Propulsion: 10,000 ihp (7,500 kW), two shafts
- Speed: 20 knots (37 km/h)
- Complement: 324
- Armament: 2 × 5.9 in (15 cm) (2 × 1); 6 × 4.7 in (12 cm) (6 × 1); 4 × 3 in (7.6 cm) (4 × 1); 4 × 1pdr (4 × 1); 2 × 45 cm (18 in) torpedo tubes
- Armour: 5 cm (2.0 in) deck

HNLMS Zeeland (Dutch: Hr.Ms. Zeeland) was a Holland-class protected cruiser of the Royal Netherlands Navy.

== Design ==
The ship was 93.3 m (306 ft) long, had a beam of 14.8 m (49 ft), a draught of 5.41 m (18 ft), and had a displacement of 3,900 ton. The ship was equipped with 2 shaft reciprocating engines, which were rated at 10,000 ihp (7,500 kW) and produced a top speed of 20 knots (37 km/h). The ship had a deck armour of 2 in (5.1 cm). Two 5.9 in (15 cm) single turret guns provided the ship's main armament, and these were augmented by six single 4.7 in (12 cm) guns and four 3 in (7.6 cm) single guns. The ship had a complement of 324 men.

== Service history ==
=== Construction and first service ===
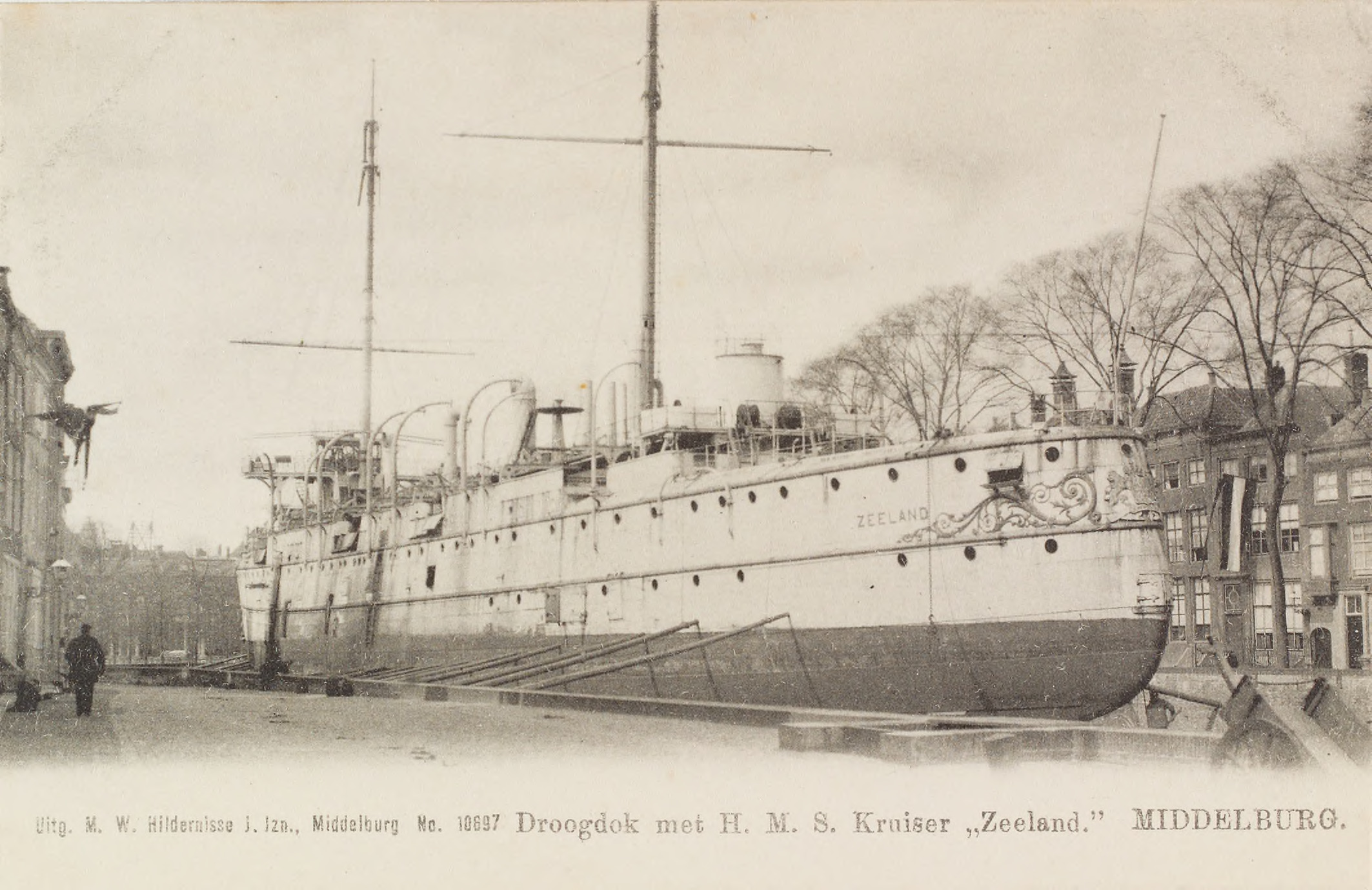
Zeeland in Middelburg Drydock in 1897

The ship was built at the Koninklijke Maatschappij de Schelde in Flushing and launched on 20 March 1897. She next went into Middelburg Drydock in April 1897, from whence she left on 12 May 1897. The ship was commissioned on 1 June 1898.

Zeeland left the port of Flushing on 18 June that year for a series of trials on the North Sea. During these trials the ship visited Plymouth. The ship served as flagship of a fleet of 18 ships on 15 September that year at a fleet review on the Hollands Diep. The review was held because of the coronation of the Dutch queen Wilhelmina of the Netherlands.

In 1899 Zeeland went on a trip to the West Indies. She arrived in Paramaribo on 24 April 1899. From Paramaribo she was planned to go to Brazil, but instead, she was forced to visit the dry dock in Martinique. The cause was a rather serious defect. When one of the sailors went to check on the rudder (stuurkamer), he found about a meter of water inside. After pumping, it was found that some bolts had broken off from where the flange of the tube of the starboard propeller axle was fastened to the hull. From there the water forcefully entered into the hull. On 16 June 1899, Zeeland finally arrived in Curaçao. On 27 July 1899 she was back in Nieuwediep, where she continued to the dry dock.

=== In the Dutch East Indies ===
On 24 June 1905 Hertog Hendrik hit a coral reef near Matjidosteen while en route to the Gulf of Boni. Zeeland made several attempts to pull the stranded ship loose, but these proved unsuccessful and were abandoned when Zeeland's bollards broke. The ship was later pulled clear after De Ruyter and Japara, a ship with towing equipment from the Koninklijke Paketvaart Maatschappij, arrived and Hertog Hendrik's coal, reserves and munitions were offloaded. Later that year Zeeland took part in an expeditions to South Celebes. The expedition was undertaken against the lord of Boni. Armed sloops of Hertog Hendrik, Zeeland and Assahan protected the landing of Dutch forces near Patiro on 20 July 1905.

In 1906 Zeeland, Koningin Regentes, along with her sister ship De Ruyter, assisted in an expedition to the island of Bali in the Dutch East Indies as part of Dutch attempts to conquer the southern kingdoms of Tabanan, Badung and Klungkung and make them part of the Dutch East Indies. On 16 and 17 September, the ships bombarded the city of Denpasar and afterwards ground forces broke what resistance remained.

=== North Sea ===
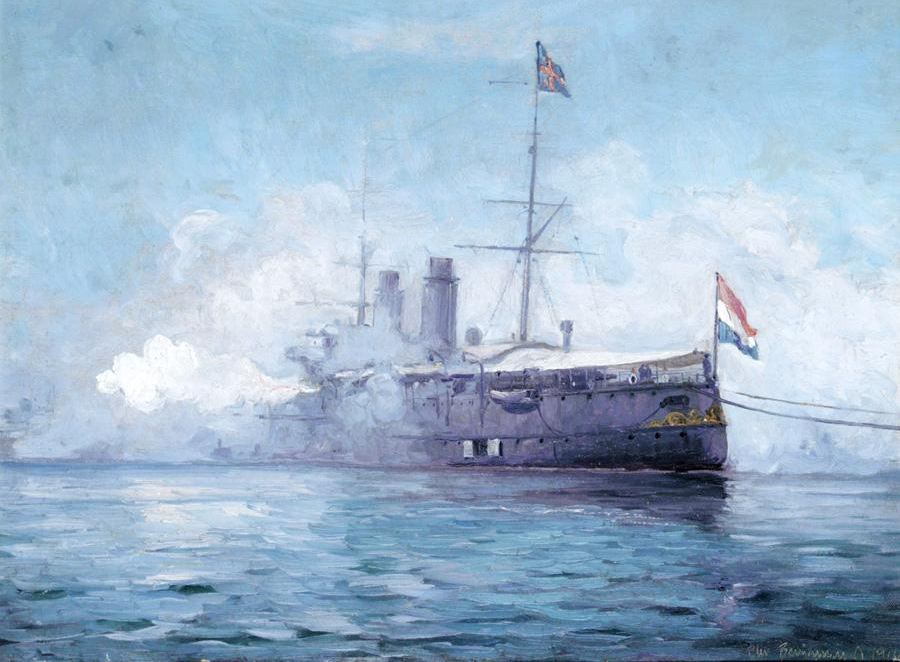
Zeeland saluting during her July 1914 cruise. Painting by Christian Benjamin Olsen.

On 2 July 1914 Zeeland left the port of IJmuiden for practice in the North and Baltic Sea. On board was Prince Henry of the Netherlands. During the trip the ship visited the ports of Copenhagen, Saint Petersburg, Stockholm and Kristiania. On 29 July the ship returned in Den Helder.

=== World War I ===
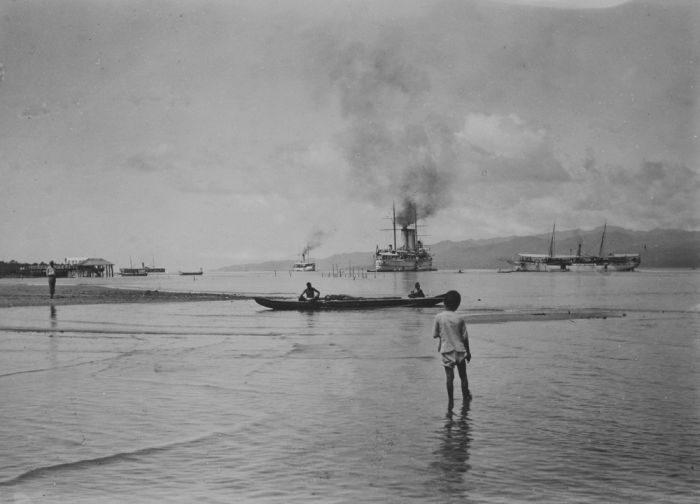
Zeeland and other steamships in the Ambon Bay

On 7 June 1917 the ship left from Den Helder for a journey round the world to Soerabaja. Along the way the ship visited Tórshavn, New York, Curaçao, Colon, Panama, San Francisco, Honolulu, Yokohama and Nagasaki. During the trip she passed through the Panama Canal and became the first foreign warship to do so. On 4 November that year she reached her destination. During the trip 53 man of the crew deserted during the visits to the US cities of New York (45) and San Francisco (8). On 3 December that year the ship left for the Netherlands. The same route was taken to reach it.

=== Decommissioned ===
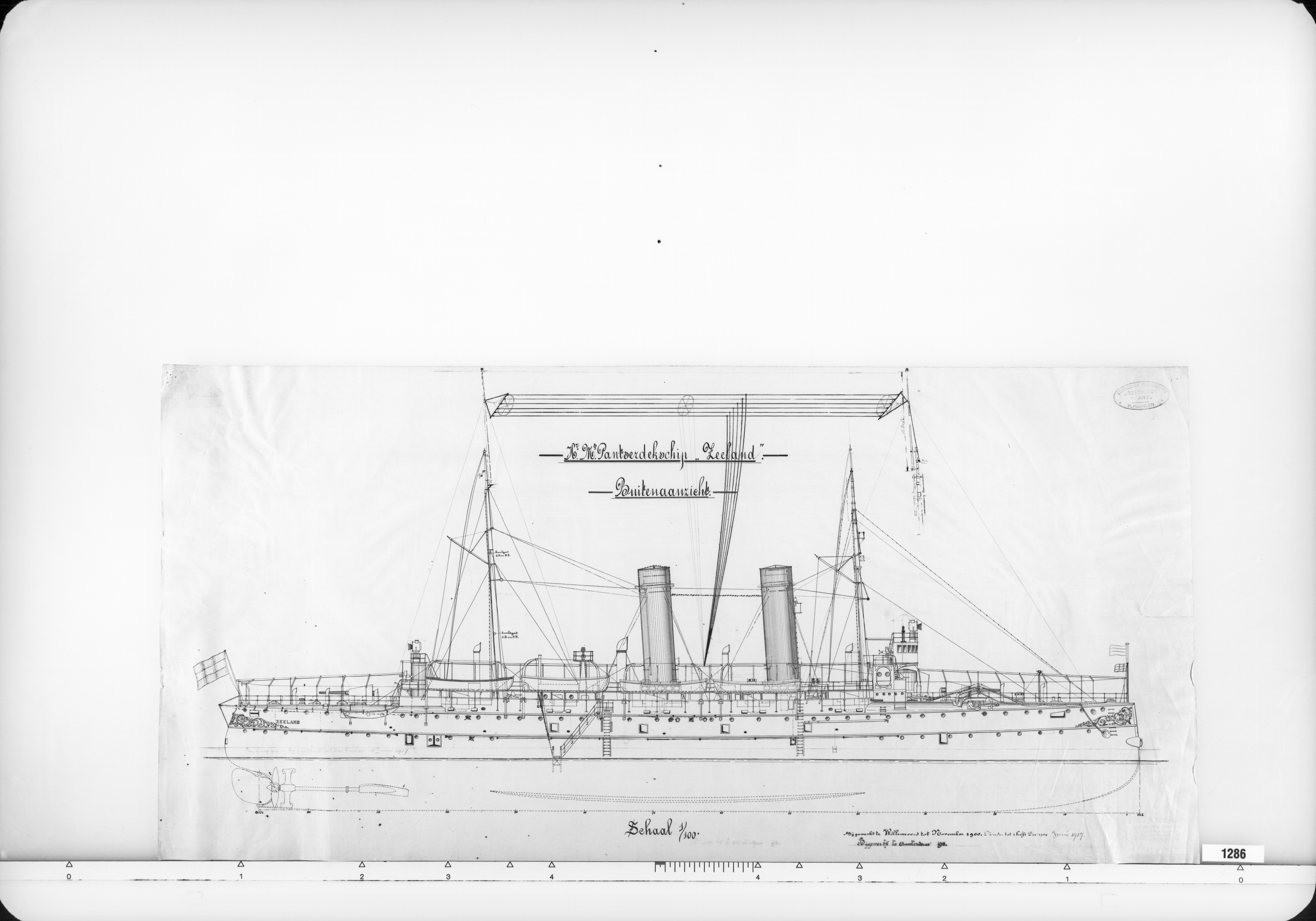
Ship plan

The ship was decommissioned in 1924.
