= Nia (charity) =

Women's charity in London

- Nia project
- Predecessor: Hackney Women's Aid (1975–2003)
- Formation: 1975
- Merger of: Clapton Women's Aid (1991)
- Type: Non-governmental organisation
- Tax ID no.: 02673624
- Registration no.: 1037072
- Purpose: provides services to women and children who have been subjected to sexual and domestic violence, including prostitution
- Headquarters: Hackney, London
- Origins: Hackney Women's Aid, 1975
- CEO: Jodie Woodward
- Key people: Onjali Q. Raúf, patron
- Subsidiaries: The Emma Project (2007); The Femicide Census (2015)
- Revenue: £3,526,973 (2024)
- Expenses: £3,596,913 (2024)
- Staff: 75 (2024)
- Volunteers: 7 (2024)
- Website: niaendingviolence.org.uk

Nia, or the Nia project (stylized in all lowercase) is a domestic violence and aid organisation which raises awareness about femicide and the support of women and girls in London. Founded as Hackney Women's Aid in 1975, the organisation rebranded as the Nia project in 2003 to reflect a widening provision of their services.

== Background ==
Hackney Women's Aid was founded in 1975 as part of a larger consortium of women's domestic violence shelters in the United Kingdom. In the beginning of the organisation's history, Hackney Women's Aid operated as a collective. Volunteers worked to outfit and maintain a series of residences initially provided by the Greater London and Hackney Councils.

Hackney Women's Aid later adopted a more hierarchal structure, merging with Clapton Women's Aid in 1991.

In 1998, Irish singer Sinead O'Connor opened the organisation's new drop-in centre in Dalston. That year, Hackney Women's Aid opened one the first domestic violence advice centres in the United Kingdom.

In 2003, in recognition of the organisation's widening suite of services, Hackney Women's Aid rebranded to the Nia project, where they support over 2,000 women and girls yearly. The organisation's title is styled in lowercase. That year, the Nia project operated seven shelters for vulnerable women in Hackney and Haringey, with an emphasis on supporting particularly vulnerable refugee and black, minority and Asian women.

In 2005, the organisation was awarded a Mayor of London Award of Distinction in recognition of "outstanding and innovative work to further the London Domestic Violence Strategy".

Following the 2010 general election, Nia's survival was threatened after losing considerable funding for service provision. The organisation had to cut their domestic violence helpline and significantly reduce their services.

=== The Femicide Census ===
In 2015, former Nia project CEO Karen Ingala Smith launched the Femicide Census, a collaborative effort between Nia and Women's Aid with support from Deloitte. Smith was inspired to start the project after learning of the death of Kirsty Treloar, a 20-year-old mother that had previously been referred to the Nia project for help.

The census tracks femicide deaths in the United Kingdom. The project aims to profile women killed by femicide, collect robust data on femicide deaths, and raise awareness of its occurrence in the UK.

== See also ==
- Domestic violence in the United Kingdom
- Women's Aid
- Southall Black Sisters
