= Nya (Javanese) =

nya
- ꦚ
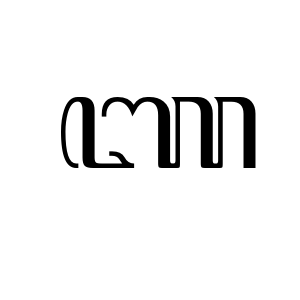
- Aksara nglegena

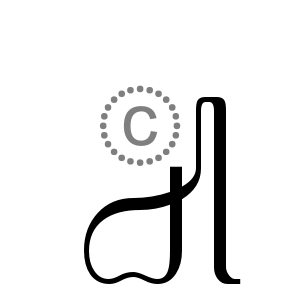
- Aksara pasangan

Usage
- Writing system: Javanese script
- Latin orthography: nya
- Sound values: [ɲ]
- In Unicode: A99A

ꦚ is one of syllable in Javanese script that represent the sound /ɲɔ/, /ɲa/. It is transliterated to Latin as "nya", and sometimes in Indonesian orthography as "nyo". It has another form (pasangan), which is ◌꧀ꦚ, but represented by a single Unicode code point, U+A99A.

== Pasangan ==
Its pasangan form ◌꧀ꦚ, is located on the bottom side of the previous syllable. For example, ꦲꦤꦏ꧀ꦚꦩꦸꦏ꧀ - anak nyamuk (little mosquito).

== Murda ==
The letter ꦚ has a murda form, which is ꦘ.

== Glyphs ==
Nglegena forms				Pasangan forms			
ꦚ nya	ꦚꦃ nyah	ꦚꦁ nyang	ꦚꦂ nyar	◌꧀ꦚ -nya	◌꧀ꦚꦃ -nyah	◌꧀ꦚꦁ -nyang	◌꧀ꦚꦂ -nyar
ꦚꦺ nye	ꦚꦺꦃ nyeh	ꦚꦺꦁ nyeng	ꦚꦺꦂ nyer	◌꧀ꦚꦺ -nye	◌꧀ꦚꦺꦃ -nyeh	◌꧀ꦚꦺꦁ -nyeng	◌꧀ꦚꦺꦂ -nyer
ꦚꦼ nyê	ꦚꦼꦃ nyêh	ꦚꦼꦁ nyêng	ꦚꦼꦂ nyêr	◌꧀ꦚꦼ -nyê	◌꧀ꦚꦼꦃ -nyêh	◌꧀ꦚꦼꦁ -nyêng	◌꧀ꦚꦼꦂ -nyêr
ꦚꦶ nyi	ꦚꦶꦃ nyih	ꦚꦶꦁ nying	ꦚꦶꦂ nyir	◌꧀ꦚꦶ -nyi	◌꧀ꦚꦶꦃ -nyih	◌꧀ꦚꦶꦁ -nying	◌꧀ꦚꦶꦂ -nyir
ꦚꦺꦴ nyo	ꦚꦺꦴꦃ nyoh	ꦚꦺꦴꦁ nyong	ꦚꦺꦴꦂ nyor	◌꧀ꦚꦺꦴ -nyo	◌꧀ꦚꦺꦴꦃ -nyoh	◌꧀ꦚꦺꦴꦁ -nyong	◌꧀ꦚꦺꦴꦂ -nyor
ꦚꦸ nyu	ꦚꦸꦃ nyuh	ꦚꦸꦁ nyung	ꦚꦸꦂ nyur	◌꧀ꦚꦸ -nyu	◌꧀ꦚꦸꦃ -nyuh	◌꧀ꦚꦸꦁ -nyung	◌꧀ꦚꦸꦂ -nyur
ꦚꦿ nyra	ꦚꦿꦃ nyrah	ꦚꦿꦁ nyrang	ꦚꦿꦂ nyrar	◌꧀ꦚꦿ -nyra	◌꧀ꦚꦿꦃ -nyrah	◌꧀ꦚꦿꦁ -nyrang	◌꧀ꦚꦿꦂ -nyrar
ꦚꦿꦺ nyre	ꦚꦿꦺꦃ nyreh	ꦚꦿꦺꦁ nyreng	ꦚꦿꦺꦂ nyrer	◌꧀ꦚꦿꦺ -nyre	◌꧀ꦚꦿꦺꦃ -nyreh	◌꧀ꦚꦿꦺꦁ -nyreng	◌꧀ꦚꦿꦺꦂ -nyrer
ꦚꦽ nyrê	ꦚꦽꦃ nyrêh	ꦚꦽꦁ nyrêng	ꦚꦽꦂ nyrêr	◌꧀ꦚꦽ -nyrê	◌꧀ꦚꦽꦃ -nyrêh	◌꧀ꦚꦽꦁ -nyrêng	◌꧀ꦚꦽꦂ -nyrêr
ꦚꦿꦶ nyri	ꦚꦿꦶꦃ nyrih	ꦚꦿꦶꦁ nyring	ꦚꦿꦶꦂ nyrir	◌꧀ꦚꦿꦶ -nyri	◌꧀ꦚꦿꦶꦃ -nyrih	◌꧀ꦚꦿꦶꦁ -nyring	◌꧀ꦚꦿꦶꦂ -nyrir
ꦚꦿꦺꦴ nyro	ꦚꦿꦺꦴꦃ nyroh	ꦚꦿꦺꦴꦁ nyrong	ꦚꦿꦺꦴꦂ nyror	◌꧀ꦚꦿꦺꦴ -nyro	◌꧀ꦚꦿꦺꦴꦃ -nyroh	◌꧀ꦚꦿꦺꦴꦁ -nyrong	◌꧀ꦚꦿꦺꦴꦂ -nyror
ꦚꦿꦸ nyru	ꦚꦿꦸꦃ nyruh	ꦚꦿꦸꦁ nyrung	ꦚꦿꦸꦂ nyrur	◌꧀ꦚꦿꦸ -nyru	◌꧀ꦚꦿꦸꦃ -nyruh	◌꧀ꦚꦿꦸꦁ -nyrung	◌꧀ꦚꦿꦸꦂ -nyrur
ꦚꦾ nyya	ꦚꦾꦃ nyyah	ꦚꦾꦁ nyyang	ꦚꦾꦂ nyyar	◌꧀ꦚꦾ -nyya	◌꧀ꦚꦾꦃ -nyyah	◌꧀ꦚꦾꦁ -nyyang	◌꧀ꦚꦾꦂ -nyyar
ꦚꦾꦺ nyye	ꦚꦾꦺꦃ nyyeh	ꦚꦾꦺꦁ nyyeng	ꦚꦾꦺꦂ nyyer	◌꧀ꦚꦾꦺ -nyye	◌꧀ꦚꦾꦺꦃ -nyyeh	◌꧀ꦚꦾꦺꦁ -nyyeng	◌꧀ꦚꦾꦺꦂ -nyyer
ꦚꦾꦼ nyyê	ꦚꦾꦼꦃ nyyêh	ꦚꦾꦼꦁ nyyêng	ꦚꦾꦼꦂ nyyêr	◌꧀ꦚꦾꦼ -nyyê	◌꧀ꦚꦾꦼꦃ -nyyêh	◌꧀ꦚꦾꦼꦁ -nyyêng	◌꧀ꦚꦾꦼꦂ -nyyêr
ꦚꦾꦶ nyyi	ꦚꦾꦶꦃ nyyih	ꦚꦾꦶꦁ nyying	ꦚꦾꦶꦂ nyyir	◌꧀ꦚꦾꦶ -nyyi	◌꧀ꦚꦾꦶꦃ -nyyih	◌꧀ꦚꦾꦶꦁ -nyying	◌꧀ꦚꦾꦶꦂ -nyyir
ꦚꦾꦺꦴ nyyo	ꦚꦾꦺꦴꦃ nyyoh	ꦚꦾꦺꦴꦁ nyyong	ꦚꦾꦺꦴꦂ nyyor	◌꧀ꦚꦾꦺꦴ -nyyo	◌꧀ꦚꦾꦺꦴꦃ -nyyoh	◌꧀ꦚꦾꦺꦴꦁ -nyyong	◌꧀ꦚꦾꦺꦴꦂ -nyyor
ꦚꦾꦸ nyyu	ꦚꦾꦸꦃ nyyuh	ꦚꦾꦸꦁ nyyung	ꦚꦾꦸꦂ nyyur	◌꧀ꦚꦾꦸ -nyyu	◌꧀ꦚꦾꦸꦃ -nyyuh	◌꧀ꦚꦾꦸꦁ -nyyung	◌꧀ꦚꦾꦸꦂ -nyyur

== Unicode block ==
Javanese script was added to the Unicode Standard in October, 2009 with the release of version 5.2.

Javanese^{[1]}^{[2]} Official Unicode Consortium code chart (PDF)
	0	1	2	3	4	5	6	7	8	9	A	B	C	D	E	F
U+A98x	ꦀ	ꦁ	ꦂ	ꦃ	ꦄ	ꦅ	ꦆ	ꦇ	ꦈ	ꦉ	ꦊ	ꦋ	ꦌ	ꦍ	ꦎ	ꦏ
U+A99x	ꦐ	ꦑ	ꦒ	ꦓ	ꦔ	ꦕ	ꦖ	ꦗ	ꦘ	ꦙ	ꦚ	ꦛ	ꦜ	ꦝ	ꦞ	ꦟ
U+A9Ax	ꦠ	ꦡ	ꦢ	ꦣ	ꦤ	ꦥ	ꦦ	ꦧ	ꦨ	ꦩ	ꦪ	ꦫ	ꦬ	ꦭ	ꦮ	ꦯ
U+A9Bx	ꦰ	ꦱ	ꦲ	꦳	ꦴ	ꦵ	ꦶ	ꦷ	ꦸ	ꦹ	ꦺ	ꦻ	ꦼ	ꦽ	ꦾ	ꦿ
U+A9Cx	꧀	꧁	꧂	꧃	꧄	꧅	꧆	꧇	꧈	꧉	꧊	꧋	꧌	꧍		ꧏ
U+A9Dx	꧐	꧑	꧒	꧓	꧔	꧕	꧖	꧗	꧘	꧙					꧞	꧟
Notes 1.As of Unicode version 17.0 2.Grey areas indicate non-assigned code points

== See also ==
- Ña (Indic)
