= Nia Technique =

Type of aerobic exercise

The Nia Technique is an Oregon business that teaches and promotes a mind/body physical conditioning program of the same name. Nia initially stood for Non-Impact Aerobics, a health and fitness alternative that emerged in the 1980s, but the Nia Technique later evolved to include practices and teachings known within the program as Neuromuscular Integrative Action. The Nia Technique was founded in 1983 by Debbie Rosas and Carlos AyaRosas in the San Francisco area. Nia combines martial arts, modern dance arts and yoga in a workout set to music.

== History ==
From 1972 to 1983 Debbie Rosas operated an exercise business in the San Francisco Bay Area known as the Bod Squad. In 1983 a series of sports related injuries prompted her to research and develop an alternative method of aerobic exercise and strength training aiming for safe, non-impact, bodymind based movement.

This led to the establishment of the Nia Technique. Nia Technique headquarters moved to Portland, Oregon in 1991 and is currently overseen by Debbie Rosas, CEO.
