= Nyan =

Nyan may refer to:

- Ba Nyan (1897–1945), Burmese painter
- Chong Hon Nyan (born 1924), Malaysian politician
- Dougbeh Chris Nyan, Liberian medic and activist
- Ousman Nyan (born 1975), Norwegian footballer
- Nyan Boateng (born 1985), American football player
- Nyan Dokpa (1967–2026), Liberian musician
- Nyan Gadsby-Dolly, Trinidad and Tobago politician
- Nyan Tun Aung (born 1948), Burmese politician, Minister for Transport of Myanmar
- Nyan Tun (born 1954), Burmese politician
- Nyan Win (born 1953), Burmese politician, Chief Minister of Bago Region from 2011 to 2016
- Nyan Win (politician, born 1942) (1942–2021), Burmese politician and Aung San Suu Kyi's personal attorney
- BAE Systems Nyan, a one-way attack drone

== See also ==
- Nyan Wheti, an ancient land route in British Columbia, Canada
- Nyan Cat, a YouTube video and internet meme of 2011
