= Net income attributable =

American accounting term

The net income attributable (NIA), is a concept in the Internal Revenue Code for calculating the net gain or loss generated by an excess individual retirement account (IRA) contribution or the net gain or loss for the purposes of a Roth IRA conversion or recharacterization. The term net income attributable is used in U.S. Code Title 26, § 408 (d)(4)(C) and is further clarified in regulation TD 9056 issued by the U.S. Treasury Department. The formula for calculating the NIA of a contribution is:

$NIA = contribution \times \frac{adjusted\ closing\ balance - adjusted\ opening\ balance}{adjusted\ opening\ balance}$

For example, when an excess IRA contribution is removed not only the excess contribution amount itself needs to be removed but also any income that was generated by that contribution while it was in the account. Conversely, if an IRA decreased in value while it contained an excess contribution the loss that can be attributed to the excess contribution does not need to be removed from the account. In the latter case, the amount that is effectively removed is the original excess amount less the NIA.

== Example ==
A Roth IRA originally contains $4,000. At the beginning of a new fiscal year, an additional contribution of $5,000 is made, which brings the total balance to $9,000. At the end of the fiscal year it turns out that the IRA holder exceeded the contribution limits (for example, due to an unexpected salary raise) and that only a partial contribution of $3,000 was allowed for that fiscal year. The excess amount of $2,000 needs to be removed from the account to avoid tax penalties. However, after the original $5,000 contribution was made, the investments in the IRA sharply declined in value due to unfavorable economic conditions. At the time of the excess removal the total value of the account is only $6,000. The NIA for the $2,000 excess contribution is:

$2000 \times \frac{6000 - 9000}{9000} = -666.\overline{66}$

The $2,000 excess contribution effectively generated a net loss of $666.67 which must be excluded from the excess removal. To bring the IRA back within the contribution limits, only $1,333.33 instead of $2,000 need to be removed ($2,000 - $666.67 = $1,333.33).
