= Nya (dog) =

British therapy dog

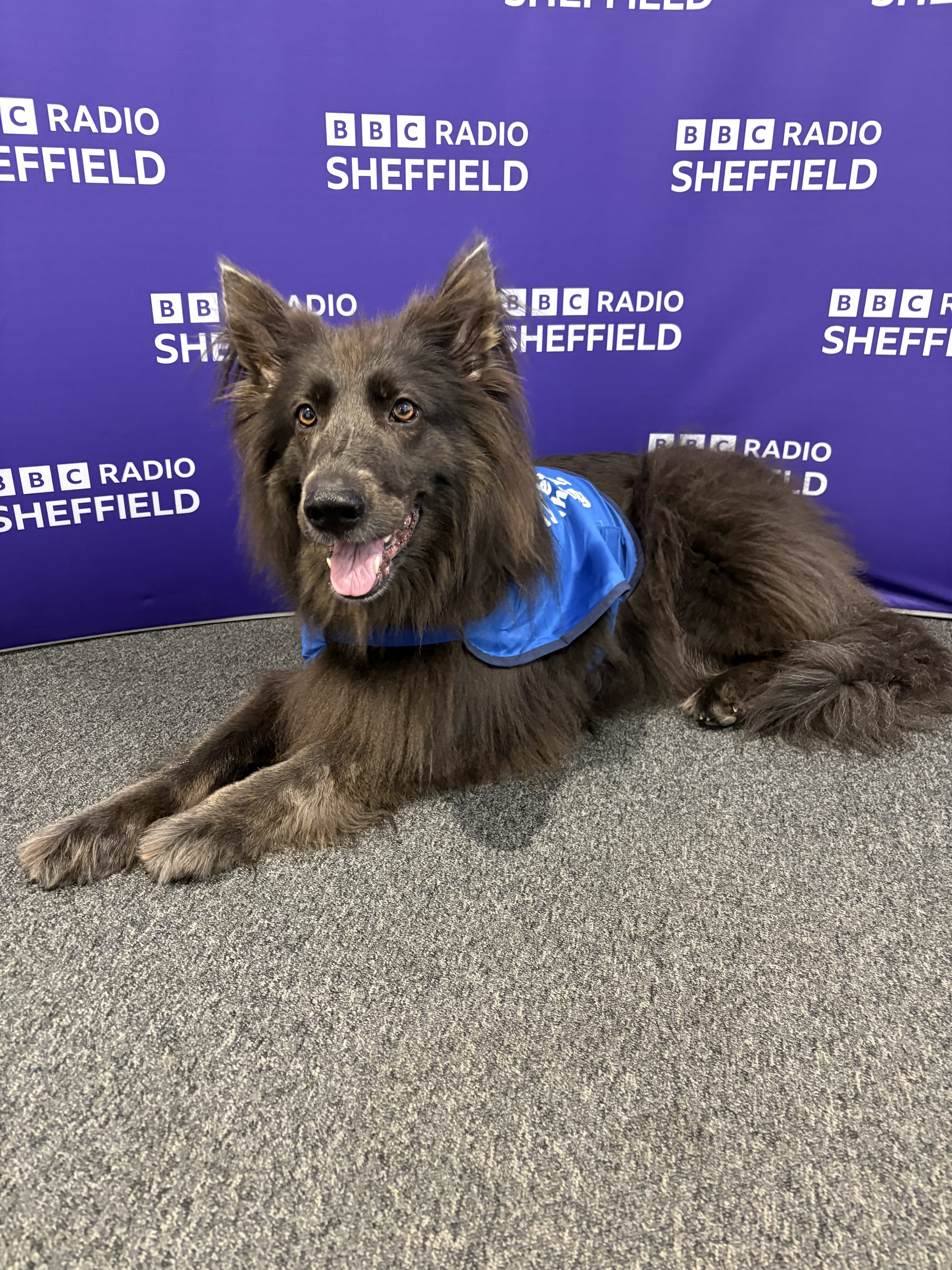
- Nya, a Pets As Therapy registered German Shepherd, at BBC Radio Sheffield (2026)
- Breed: German Shepherd
- Occupation: Therapy dog
- Years active: 2024–present
- Known for: Therapy work across the UK rail network
- Owner: Stephen O’Callaghan BEM

Nya is a British Pets As Therapy registered German Shepherd known for her work supporting passengers, staff and communities across the TransPennine Express (TPE) rail network. She has been widely reported in independent media as the first therapy dog in the United Kingdom to be officially registered with a Train Operating Company.

Independent coverage of Nya’s work has appeared in national, regional and specialist media, including The Times, BBC News, The Guardian, SWNS, York Press, The Star, The Bolton News, Mancunian Matters, GB News, Prolific North, Rail UK, Good News Post and Talker News.

== Career ==
=== Pets As Therapy certification (2024) ===
Nya became a certified Pets As Therapy dog in December 2024.

=== Rail wellbeing work (2025–present) ===
In 2025, Nya became the first therapy dog in UK rail history to be officially registered with a Train Operating Company (TransPennine Express). Independent media reported her role in providing emotional reassurance, crisis-calming support and wellbeing engagement for passengers experiencing anxiety, stress or travel-related difficulties.

Her work has been featured by BBC News, The Times, GB News, and Prolific North, which reported her appearance on the BBC game show Bridge of Lies.

=== Children’s safeguarding book (2026) ===
Nya features in the children’s safeguarding book Nya the Train Dog: A Tale of Safety and Smiles, which aims to help young travellers understand rail safety. The book’s release was covered by York Press, Good News Post, and Rail UK.

=== Public events ===
Nya has taken part in public engagement events across the North of England, including a meet‑and‑greet at Manchester Central Library.

== Awards ==
Nya was recognised at the Houses of Parliament in the Education Community Dogs of the Year Awards and was shortlisted for the BBC Make A Difference Award (Animal Hero).

== Handler ==
Nya’s handler, Stephen O’Callaghan, is a safeguarding specialist and former police officer. He was awarded the British Empire Medal in the King’s Birthday Honours 2026, confirmed by independent reporting from the British Transport Police and the official notice published in The London Gazette.
