= NAIA =

Naia or NAIA may refer to:

== Aviation ==
- North American Institute of Aviation, flight school in Conway, South Carolina
- Ninoy Aquino International Airport, serving Metro Manila, Philippines
  - NAIA Expressway (E6)
  - NAIA Road (N194)
- Nnamdi Azikiwe International Airport, serving Abuja, Nigeria

== Other ==
- National Association of Intercollegiate Athletics, college athletics association
- Naia (skeleton), a Paleoamerican skeleton
- National Animal Interest Alliance, an animal welfare organization in the United States

== See also ==
- Naiad (disambiguation)
