= Serdang-class tender =

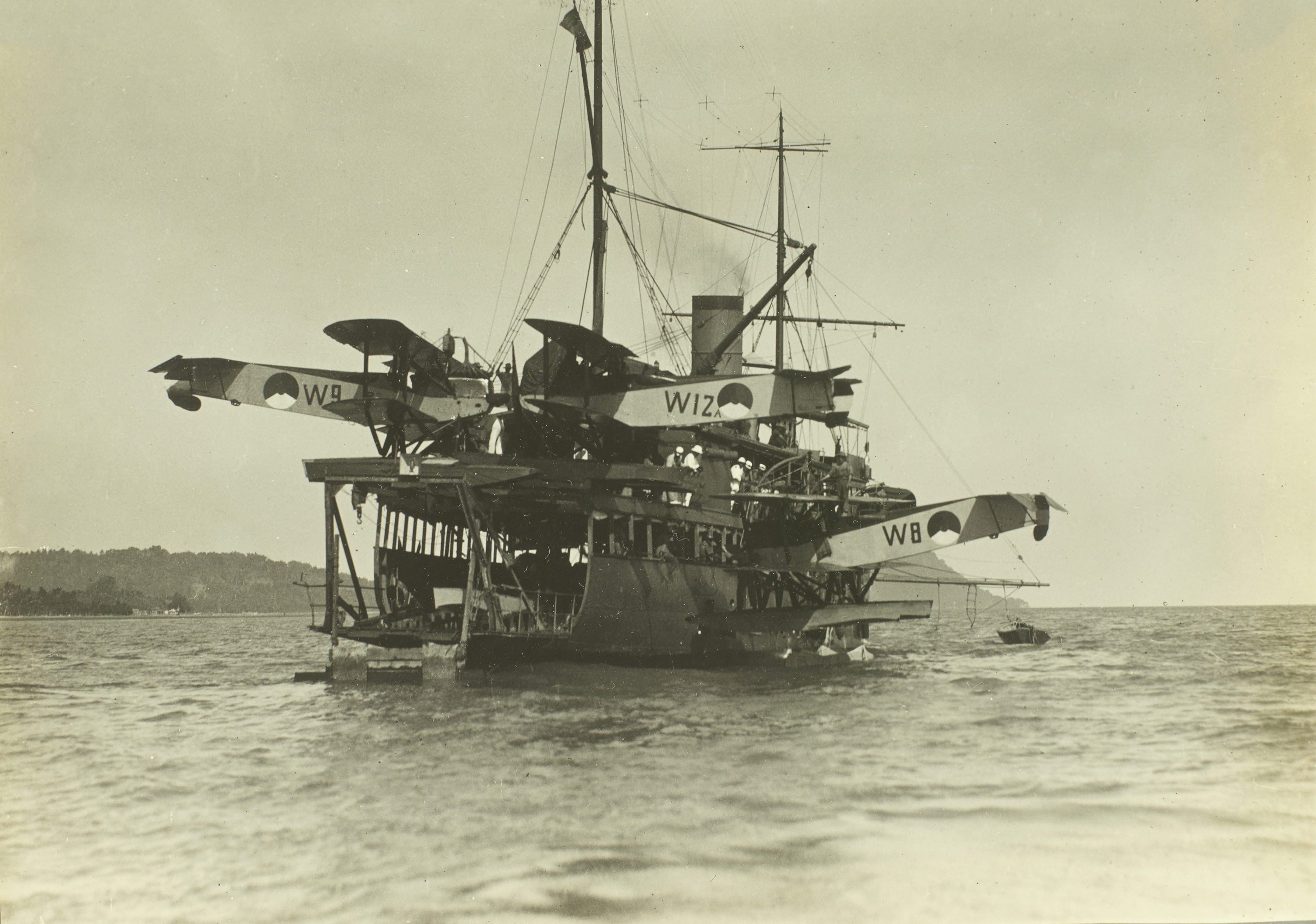
- HNLMS Serdang with three van Berkel floatplanes

Class overview
- Name: Serdang class
- Builders: Koninklijke Maatschappij De Schelde Vlissingen (1); Nederlandse Scheepsbouw Maatschappij Amsterdam (2)
- Operators: Royal Netherlands Navy
- In commission: 1923-1942 as tenders; 1896–1942 in total
- Completed: 4
- Lost: 1
- Retired: 3

General characteristics
- Type: Gunboat, later converted to minelayer and then converted again to MTB tender / seaplane tender
- Displacement: 1,290 t (1,270 long tons)
- Length: 53.9 m (176 ft 10 in)
- Beam: 9.44 m (31 ft 0 in)
- Draught: 3.69 m (12 ft 1 in)
- Installed power: 1,290 hp (960 kW)
- Propulsion: 1 x triple expansion boiler with 1 shaft
- Speed: 13 knots (24 km/h; 15 mph)
- Complement: 64
- Armament: 2 × single 10.5 cm (4.1 in); 1 x dual purpose 7.5 cm (3.0 in); 4 x single 3.7 cm (1.5 in); 1 x 7.5 cm (3.0 in) mortar

The Serdang-class tender came into existence due to the rebuilding of the old, but similar Nias-class and Koetei-class gunboats. The seven ships of these classes would serve as gunboats until 1921 after which they were either rebuilt as minelayers or decommissioned. Of the ships that were converted into minelayers, four would be rebuilt once more between 1923-1932 into tenders becoming the Serdang-class tenders.

== Construction ==
Name	Commissioned	Decommissioned	Fate
Serdang	17 September 1897	6 March 1942	Scuttled
Koetei	1898	1931	Transferred to the Governments Marine, later decommissioned
Siboga	1898	1933	Decommissioned
Assahan	1899	1924	Decommissioned, Sold in 1931

== Service history ==
Upon the outbreak of the second world war, only HNLMS Serdang was still in service. She served as a patrol ship and mother ship to motor torpedo boats (MTBs), submarines and seaplanes until the fall of Java. She was then scuttled by her own crew on 6 March 1942 after being unable to escape to Australia.
