= Nyad (soundtrack) =

Nyad (Soundtrack from the Netflix Film)

Film score by Alexandre Desplat
- Released: November 3, 2023
- Genre: Film score
- Length: 58:10
- Label: Netflix Music
- Producer: Alexandre Desplat

Alexandre Desplat chronology
| Asteroid City (2023) | Nyad (2023) | The Boys in the Boat (2023) |

Singles from Nyad (Soundtrack from the Netflix Film)
- 1. "Find a Way" Released: November 1, 2023

Nyad (Soundtrack from the Netflix Film) is the soundtrack to the 2023 sports drama film of the same name directed by Elizabeth Chai Vasarhelyi and Jimmy Chin. The film's music provided by Alexandre Desplat, featured 17 cues from his score with an original song "Find a Way" by Jade Bird, preceded as the lead single on November 1. The soundtrack itself was released two days later, that coincided the theatrical release.

== Background ==
In August 2023, Alexandre Desplat was announced to score music for the film. He did not want the score to be overwhelming as it would have killed the reality of Nyad's life and her experiences. Following an organic approach of writing the film's music, he also appreciated Vasarhelyi and Chin's direction being "strong" and allowing the audiences to share the dangers and emotions that Nyad faces. Vasarhelyi wanted the score to explore the internal landscape of her mind which Desplat did, and further added a layer of restraint to the act, that felt so outrageous.

Desplat wrote two themes for Nyad: the first being a "bright, rising tune" with electric guitar and flute to "make us feel who she is" and not to be a sophisticated melody with changes in chords, instead should be easy to grasp and being clear as it conveys the immense challenge she sets before herself. While the second theme, is about the sexual trauma she experienced as a child that appears in flashback. At that point, the tune becomes more mysterious and rhythmic, with flutes playing over guitar, two dark chords and timpani as "The music has to bring out who she is, and how she suffers, how she dreams, when she has delirium, what has traumatized her when she was a child".

== Track listing ==
| No. | Title | Length |
|---|---|---|
| 1. | "Find a Way" (performed by Jade Bird) | 3:11 |
| 2. | "Young Diana" | 3:21 |
| 3. | "Diana" | 2:59 |
| 4. | "Shark Plan" | 1:27 |
| 5. | "Pier Chat" | 2:09 |
| 6. | "Team NYAD" | 4:15 |
| 7. | "Fighting the Waves" | 5:41 |
| 8. | "Second Attempt" | 2:20 |
| 9. | "Jellyfish Attack" | 4:16 |
| 10. | "Race Flashback" | 4:22 |
| 11. | "Sand from the Sahara" | 3:04 |
| 12. | "From Miami to Cuba" | 1:38 |
| 13. | "The Storm" | 2:47 |
| 14. | "Bonnie Leaves" | 2:38 |
| 15. | "Pool Training" | 1:55 |
| 16. | "The Stream" | 2:58 |
| 17. | "Lights on the Horizon" | 2:46 |
| 18. | "Florida" | 6:23 |
| Total length: | | 58:10 |

== Reception ==
Isabella Soares of Collider commented that Desplat's score perfectly complimented the emotional moments, while further adding "This story is about triumph and exceeding expectations and the composer expertly evoke this in the viewer whenever a swimming sequence takes place. From Nyad's most terrifying encounters in the water (like an unnerving jellyfish event) to her being just a few miles away from getting to Florida's shore, the score accompanies these shots perfectly, with pauses now and then to gain momentum." Peter Travers of ABC News wrote "composer Alexandre Desplat propel the action at a furious clip". Below the Line critic Edward Douglas wrote "Nyad's biggest outright ringer is Oscar-winning composer Alexandre Desplat, who knows how to create the right balance between inspiring orchestral fireworks and helping to create the necessary tension on whether Nyad might succeed. To some, this might be one of Desplat’s more heavy-handed scores, yet it still generally works." Rex Reed of Observer described it as "magnetic".

== Accolades ==
| Award | Date of Ceremony | Category | Recipient(s) | Result | Ref |
|---|---|---|---|---|---|
| Hollywood Music in Media Awards | November 15, 2023 | Original Score — Feature Film | Alexandre Desplat | Nominated | |
